= The Qin Empire III =

- Poster
- Also known as: The Chin Empire - Rise
- 大秦帝国之崛起
- Genre: Historical drama
- Developed by: Jiao Yang
- Screenplay by: Zhang Jianwei; Qian Jierong
- Story by: Sun Haohui
- Directed by: Ding Hei; Bao Chengzhi
- Creative director: Ding Guoli
- Presented by: Li Yuan; Wang Fubao; Li Yaojie
- Starring: Ning Jing; Zhang Bo; Xing Jiadong; Lu Ning; Yang Zhigang; Zhao Chunyang; Shen Jiani; Wu Liansheng
- Ending theme: "Rise" (崛起) by Tan Jing and Chen Bing
- Composers: Zhao Jiping; Zhao Lin
- Country of origin: China
- Original language: Mandarin
- No. of episodes: 40

Production
- Executive producers: He Xiaoli; He Jindong; Lu Dongzhang; Fan Chongjun; Liu Ximin; Han Gang
- Producers: Chen Jili; Liu Juntao
- Production location: China
- Cinematography: Zhang Chaoying
- Editor: Wang Yuwei
- Running time: ≈45 minutes per episode
- Production companies: Xi'an Qujiang Chin Empire Film & TV Investment

Original release
- Network: CCTV-1
- Release: 9 February – 6 March 2012

Related
- The Qin Empire (2009); The Qin Empire II: Alliance (2012); The Qin Empire IV (2019)

The Qin Empire III (大秦帝国之崛起) is a 2017 Chinese historical television series based on Sun Haohui's novel of the same Chinese title, which romanticises the events in China during the Warring States period primarily from the perspective of the Qin state under King Zhaoxiang. It was first aired on CCTV-1 in mainland China in 2017. It was preceded by The Qin Empire (2009) and The Qin Empire II: Alliance (2012) and followed by The Qin Empire IV (2019), which were also based on Sun Haohui's novels.

== Synopsis ==
The series is set in the late fourth century BC to the mid-third century BC during the Warring States period of China. In 305 BC, a young Ying Ji (King Zhaoxiang) becomes the ruler of the Qin state in western China after the sudden death of his brother, Ying Dang (King Wu). As he is still underage then, his mother Queen Dowager Xuan and maternal uncle Wei Ran rule on his behalf as regents until he comes to of age.

With the aid of the minister Fan Ju and general Bai Qi, King Zhaoxiang starts making aggressive advances against the other six states in the east. Under his rule, the Qin state destroys the Yiqu state, builds a section of the Great Wall, defeats the Qi and Chu states in battle, forces the Wei and Han states into submission, and inflicts a devastating defeat on the Zhao state at the Battle of Changping. After demonstrating its military power through its victories, in 256 BC the Qin state finally puts an end to the Eastern Zhou dynasty, the nominal suzerain power over the warring states. These events paved the way for the Qin state's eventual unification of China under the Qin dynasty within the next half-century.

== Cast ==
- Ning Jing as Queen Dowager Xuan of Qin
- Zhang Bo as Ying Ji (King Zhaoxiang of Qin)
- Xing Jiadong as Bai Qi
- Lu Ning as Queen Yeyang of Qin
- Zhao Chunyang as Wei Ran
- Shen Jiani as Zhao Man
- Wu Liansheng as Fan Ju
- Wang Huichun as King Min of Qi
- Wang Shuangbao as Lian Po
- Chen Hao as King of Yiqu
- Peng Bo as King Huai of Chu
- Yang Zhigang as Mi Yuan
- Zheng Tianyong as Zhao Yang
- Wang Xiaoyi as Su Qin
- Huo Qing as Lord Mengchang of Qi
- Fu Dalong as King Huiwen of Qin
- Fu Miao as Queen Huiwen of Qin
- Wang Zitong as Wei Lingyou
- Ma Xiaoning as Wei Youzhan
- Yuan Yu as Tang Bazi
- Zhou Bo as Ying Ji (Chuli Ji)
- Sun Qiang as Gan Mao
- Ying Qiang as Mi Rong
- Ji Yongqing as Sima Cuo
- Jin Shengyu as Meng Ao
- Yin Jing as Wang Ji
- Sui Tangyang as Wang He
- Wu Yuze as Wei Choufu
- Peng Guobin as Ying Shi
- Zhang Jingwei as Ying Kui
- Lu Jia as Zheng Anping
- Shen Baoping as Li Bing
- He Shubiao as Li Erlang
- Hu Jiaxu as Ying Zhuo
- Qiu Donghong as Hushang
- Sun Rong as King Zhao of Yan
- Wang Di as Jihu
- Dang Hao as Yue Yi
- Chen Liang as Jiming
- Ma Sai as Goudao
- Li Zonghan as Tian Jian
- Gao Jin as Lord Xinling of Wei
- Wu Hongwu as King Zhao of Wei
- Liu Zhongyuan as Wei Yu (King Anxi of Wei)
- Di Jianqing as Wei Qi
- Yao Runhao as Xu Gu
- Yan Yichang as Hou Ying
- Jiao Junxiang as Lin Xiangru
- Li Huailong as King Huiwen of Zhao
- Zhang Di as Zhao Dan (King Xiaocheng of Zhao)
- Liu Naiyi as Lord Pingyuan of Zhao
- Song Chongdong as Lord Pingyang of Zhao
- Zhou Le as Lord Fengyang of Zhao
- Qi Tao as Zhao She
- Zhang Yiwen as Zhao Kuo
- Gao Ying as Zhao Kuo's mother
- Ma Xiaoning as Lou Huan
- Liu Jun as Yu Qing
- Luo Tianyou as Mao Sui
- Chen Zhou as King Xi of Han
- Ren Xuehai as Gongzhong Chi
- Yang Tieran as Feng Ting
- Liao Wei as Xiong Heng (King Qingxiang of Chu)
- Lu Siyu as Xiong Wan (King Kaolie of Chu)
- Wei Hua as Zilan
- Xiahou Bin as Jin Shang
- Xu Dongsheng as Lord Chunshen of Chu
- Jin Song as Nao Chi
- Chen Xiao as Mi Yan

== Broadcasts ==
Region	Network	Dates	Notes
Mainland China	CCTV-1	9 February – 6 March 2017	
Mainland China	LeEco	9 February 2017 – ?	
Mainland China	Tencent	9 February 2017 – ?	
Mainland China	Youku	9 February 2017 – ?	
Malaysia	NTV7	3 June 2017 – 14 October 2017	Saturday; 20:30 – 22:30
