= Changping of the War =

- DVD cover art
- Also known as: Xifeng Lie
- 铁血长平 / 西风烈
- Genre: Historical drama
- Written by: Zhao Bingyu
- Directed by: Zheng Kehong
- Presented by: Gao Jianmin
- Starring: Bao Guo'an; Wei Zi; Xu Huanshan; Gai Lili; Wei Zongwan; Xie Yuan
- Opening theme: "Unify the World" (天下归心) by Han Lei
- Composer: Yang Kai
- Country of origin: China
- Original language: Mandarin
- No. of episodes: 30

Production
- Executive producers: Yu Guanghua; Wei Ping; Zhang Shaonong; Li Yanhong; He Rui
- Producers: Zhao Kuiyuan; Jia Xiaochen
- Production location: China
- Cinematography: Zhang Shaojun
- Editors: Li Jingzhong; Zhang Shaojun
- Running time: ≈45 minutes per episode

Changping of the War (铁血长平), also known as The Battle of Changping and Xifeng Lie (西风烈; "Fierce Wind from the West"), is a 2004 Chinese historical television series based on the events surrounding the Battle of Changping (262–260 BC) fought between the states of Qin and Zhao during the Warring States period of ancient China.

== Synopsis ==
The series is set in the third-century BC China during the Warring States period, focusing on the events surrounding the Battle of Changping (262–260 BC) between the states of Qin and Zhao. Lin Xiangru becomes the chancellor of Zhao after his diplomatic successes with the return of the heshibi to Zhao and at the Qin–Zhao summit at Mianchi. He manages to buy time for Zhao to recover after its earlier defeats by Qin, while the Zhao general Zhao She also repels a Qin invasion at the Battle of Eyu (270–269 BC).

In Qin, King Zhaoxiang takes over the reins of power from his uncle Wei Ran, removes him as regent, and appoints Fan Ju as chancellor. Qin forces attack Zhao but encounter resistance from Zhao defenders led by Lian Po. Through bribery of a corrupt Zhao official, Fan Ju makes King Xiaocheng of Zhao doubt Lian Po and replace him with the smooth-talking but inexperienced Zhao Kuo. The Zhao forces under Zhao Kuo's leadership suffer a disastrous defeat at the hands of Qin forces led by Bai Qi during the Battle of Changping.

After the battle, under Lin Xiangru's direction, Zhao initiates peace talks with Qin. King Zhaoxiang orders Bai Qi, who is on the brink of conquering Zhao for Qin, to pull back and return to Qin. Bai Qi, who feels resentful, eventually loses King Zhaoxiang's trust and is forced to commit suicide. Qin invades Zhao again later but is forced to retreat at the Battle of Handan (259–257) when Wei and Chu come to Zhao's aid. Despite Zhao's success, Lin Xiangru foresees the eventual fall of Zhao in 228 BC.

== Cast ==
- Bao Guo'an as King Zhaoxiang of Qin
- Wei Zi as Bai Qi
- Xu Huanshan as King Huiwen of Zhao
- Gai Lili as Lady Chu
- Wei Zongwan as Wei Ran
- Xie Yuan as Lin Xiangru
- Sun Weimin as Fan Ju
- Xu Zhengyun as Lian Po
- Yan Xiaopin as Queen Huiwen of Zhao
- Li Nan as Zhao Kuo
- Li Xinyu as Feng Zhu
- Yue Jiatong as Zhao Qi
- Yizhen as Bian Chu
- Guo Jing as Bian Yu
- Sun Yucai as Miu Xian
- Guo Weihua as Zhao Sheng
- Geng Sheng as King Xiaocheng of Zhao
- Gong Lifeng as Jia Ling
- Zhang Youling as King Kaolie of Chu
- Li Rongxin as the Chu chancellor
- Yan Ni as Lady Jia
- Chen Jiming as Zhao She
- Xu Xiaojian as Wang He
- Geng Sheng as Zhao Dan
- Gao Zhao as Hu Yang
- Li Chengbin as Feng Heng
- He Guobin as Wang Ling
- Luo Shuai as Hu Lin'er
- Zhang Gang as Yuan Heng
- Huang Xiangyang as Qu Yong
- Wang Xi as Wang Ji
- Wang Chi as Deng Gu
- Peng Zhidong as Zheng Anping
- Ai Lima as Lady Hu
- Liang Yu as Lady Bai
- Di Yunpeng as Yang Huo
- Zhang Zhendong as Yang He
- He Bo as Su Dai
- Wang Wei as Wang Jian
- Jin Biao as Li Mu
- Xu Xiaming as the emcee
- Li Ke as Guo Sheng
- Liu Bo as Mao Sui
- Wang Jie as Alan
- Chen Zhihui as Wei Wuji
- Yang Chunwu as Huang Xie
- Zhang Jianguo as Jia Yan
- Yan Fucheng as Tu Hong
- Zhang Maolin as Deng Wu
- Zhang Zhongming as Gongsun Xiang
- Shao Xiaoshan as Xiaozhao
- He Jing as Qiuyue
- Chen Shuhuan as Lady Yan
- Jiang Xiaoyu as Fan Ju's wife
- Qian Wenhua as Lin Xiangru's housekeeper
- Weng Hui as Heixiong
- Chen Gang as Zhu Da
- Zhaxi as Su Ye
- Wang Yongxin as Sima Cuo
- Li Songke as Wang Rong
- Xiong Xiong as Fu Bao
- Gao Kefei as Meng Ao
- Shi Jiading as Bai Qi's decoy
- Lu Youcheng as Wei Qi
- Zhu Xuexiang as He Hu
- Li Minghai as Zhao Hu
- Junjian as Zhu Hai
- An Rongsheng as Wei Qing
- Liu Shungang as Jin Bi
- Wang Zhiyi as Hou Ying
- Zhang Jian as Xu Li
- Chen Gang as Zhang Tang
- Li Keke as Axiu
- Liu Li as Lady Qian
- Liu Li as Lady Li
- Liu Yuhong as Lady Han
- Ni Chunxia as Lady Qi
- Zhang Guangsen as Zheng Zhu
- Zhou Tao as Sima Geng
