= King Zhaoxiang of Qin =

King of Qin, China from 307 to 251 BC

King Zhaoxiang of Qin 秦昭襄王
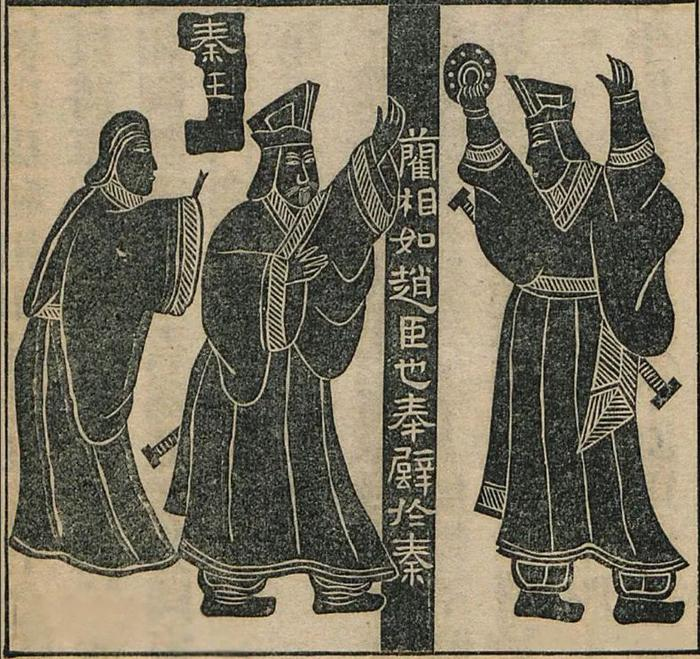
- Relief tracing of King Zhaoxiang of Qin, with Lin Xiangru handling the Heshibi, and on Wu Family Shrines stone-relief, from Jinshisuo (金石索).

King of Qin
- Reign: 307–251 BC
- Predecessor: King Wu of Qin
- Successor: King Xiaowen of Qin
- Regent: Wei Ran
- Born: 325 BC
- Died: 251 BC (aged 73–74)
- Spouse: Queen Yeyang; Queen Dowager Tang
- Issue: Crown Prince Dao; King Xiaowen of Qin
Names
- Ancestral name: Ying (嬴); Given name: Ji (稷)
Posthumous name
- King Zhaoxiang (昭襄王)
- House: Ying
- Dynasty: Qin
- Father: King Huiwen of Qin
- Mother: Queen Dowager Xuan

King Zhaoxiang of Qin (Chinese: 秦昭襄王; 325–251 BC), also abbreviated as King Zhao of Qin (秦昭王), born Ying Ji (嬴稷), was a king of the state of Qin during the Eastern Zhou dynasty, reigning from 306 BC to 251 BC. He was the son of King Huiwen and the younger brother of King Wu.

King Zhaoxiang reigned as the king of Qin for 57 years, and was responsible for the state of Qin achieving strategic dominance over the other six major states. During his reign, Qin captured the Chu capital Ying in 278 BC, conquered the Xirong state of Yiqu in 272 BC, defeated a 450,000-strong Zhao army at Changping in 260 BC, and overthrew the Eastern Zhou dynasty in 256 BC. These aggressive territorial expansions and the strategic weakening of other rival states paved the path for Qin's eventual unification of China proper three decades later by his great-grandson Ying Zheng, later known as Qin Shi Huang.

In King Zhaoxiang's 1st Year, 306 BC, Qin returned Wusui to Han, Qin sends General Xiang Shou (向壽) to pacify Yiyang (宜陽, Captured the year before in 307 BC), Generals Gan Mao (甘茂) and Chulizi are sent to attack Wei's Puban, Gan Mao would flee into Qi. In his 3rd Year, 304 BC, The King met with King Huai of Chu at Huangji (黃棘), Qin signed an alliance with Chu, ceding Shangyong (上庸) to Chu. In his 4th Year, 303 BC, Qin attacked Wei, capturing Puban (蒲阪) Yangjin (晉陽), and Fengling (封陵), they then attacked Han, capturing Wusui (武遂).

== Life ==
=== Ascension ===
Prince Ying Ji was born in 325 BC to one of King Huiwen's low-ranked concubines, Lady Mi (羋八子). As a shu child, Prince Ji was given low priority in the royal line of succession, and as an underage child was not granted a fief because the state of Qin employed a system of meritocracy that demanded that even princes earn their own lands through national service. He was dispatched to the state of Yan at a young age to serve as a political hostage, a common diplomatic practice among vassal states throughout the Zhou dynasty.

In 307 BC, Ying Ji's older half-brother, King Wu, unexpectedly died after breaking his shin bones while trying to show off his physical prowess by lifting a heavy bronze cauldron in the Zhou palace in Wangcheng. King Wu died young and childless, placing the state of Qin into a succession crisis as a number of princes were now eligible to claim the throne. During this time, Prince Ji was still a hostage in the state of Yan, and was generally considered unlikely to be a candidate. However, King Wuling of Zhao decided to take advantage of the situation and intervene in the domestic politics of Qin. One of the primary reasons was to destabilize his most dangerous rival by influencing the succession of its ruler, ensuring a weaker or compliant King of Qin was installed, and securing Zhao's own borders. King Wuling of Zhao ordered his chancellor of the Dai Commandery, Zhao Gu (趙固), to smuggle Prince Ji out of Yan into Zhao territory, before endorsing him to return to Qin and contest for the throne. Furthermore, Prince Ji's maternal uncle, Wei Ran (魏冉), was a general in command of a significant Qin military forces, and helped in suppressing most of his nephew's political opponents. This enabled Prince Ji to successfully claim the throne and rise to be King Zhaoxiang of Qin at the age of 18.

Because King Zhaoxiang would not yet legally come of age until the age of 20, his mother, who was now known as Queen Dowager Xuan, became the regent. She was supported by her brothers Wei Ran and Mi Rong (羋戎), as well as two other sons, Prince Yi (公子悝) and Prince Fu (公子巿), the four of them collectively known as the "Four Nobles" (四貴).

=== Reign ===
In his first year as ruler, King Zhaoxiang accepted the counsel of the Right Chancellor, Gan Mao (甘茂), who advocated for the return of the Wusui (武遂) region back to the state of Han. The plan was opposed by two other officials, Xiang Shou (向壽) and Gongsun Shi (公孫奭), who both despised Gan Mao greatly and proceeded to slander him repeatedly. This led Gan Mao to flee Qin in fear of his life and defect to the state of Qi.

In 305 BC, two of King Zhaoxiang's older half-brothers, Prince Zhuang (公子壯) and Prince Yong (公子雍), conspired to carry out a coup with Queen Huiwen (惠文后, the mother of the late King Wu) and Queen Wu (悼武王后, King Wu's childless wife, a princess from Wei) as well as a dozen other lords and court officials who were against King Zhaoxiang's ascension. The rebellion was quickly crushed by Wei Ran, who slaughtered all of the conspirators. Queen Huiwen was executed as a result of this coup. Only Queen Wu survived and was exiled back to Wei. With the annihilation of the dissidents, King Zhaoxiang's hold on the throne was secured. In the same year, King Zhaoxiang had his coming-of-age ceremony and began to personally attend to state affairs.

==== War against Chu ====
In 304 BC, King Zhaoxiang met with King Huai of Chu in Huangqi (黃棘) to negotiate an alliance, ceding Shangyong (上庸) as a gesture of goodwill. In 303 BC, the states of Qi, Wei and Han broke their previous alliance with Chu and invaded Chu, forcing Chu to send its crown prince, Xiong Heng, to Qin as a hostage in exchange for Qin assistance. King Zhaoxiang sent troops to attack Wei and Han, capturing Puban (蒲阪), Yangchun (陽春) and Fengling (封陵) from Wei, and re-capturing Wusui from Han. In 302 BC, King Zhaoxiang met with King Xiang of Wei and Crown Prince Yin of Han (韓太子嬰) in Linjin (臨晉), and agreed to return the seized lands in exchange for the two states renouncing their previous anti-Qin alliance. At the same time, the Chu crown prince secretly fled from Qin back to Chu.

In 301 BC, the four states of Qin, Han, Wei and Qi allied together to attack Chu, defeating the Chu army at Zhongqiu (重丘) and killing the Chu general Tang Mei (唐眜). In 300 BC, King Zhaoxiang sent his uncle Mi Rong to capture Xiangcheng (襄城), killing 30,000 enemy soldiers and the Chu general Jing Que (景缺) in the process.

Due to this defeat, in 299 BC King Huai of Chu was forced to go to Wu Pass (武關) to negotiate terms with Qin, but along the way was abducted and taken to Xianyang instead. When he refused to cede the territory of the Wu Commandery (巫郡) and Qianzhong Commandery (黔中郡), he was detained as a hostage. King Zhaoxiang then proceeded to invade Chu the next year, capturing 16 cities and killing 50,000 Chu soldiers. King Huai of Chu did manage to escape in 297 BC, while Qin was distracted by a joint siege on Hangu Pass by Wei and Han, but he was recaptured while he was seeking asylum in Wei, after his bid for asylum in the state of Zhao failed. He died a year later in captivity, and Qin finally returned his corpse back to Chu.

The next king of Chu, King Qingxiang, was an even less competent ruler than his father. In 280 BC, Qin forces defeated the Chu army again, forcing them to cede Shangyong and Hanbei (漢北) to Qin control. In 279 BC, Qin generals Bai Qi (白起) and Zhang Ruo (張若) launched amphibious assaults on Chu from two different fronts, capturing the cities of Deng (鄧), Yan (鄢, Chu's secondary capital at the time) and Xiling (西陵), during which Bai Qi flooded the city of Yan with a redirected river, drowning hundreds of thousands of people. This successful Qin campaign paved the way for Bai Qi's subsequent siege and capture of the Chu capital city of Ying (郢) in 278 BC, where Bai Qi burned the Chu ancestral mausoleums Yiling. The greatly weakened state of Chu was forced to relocate its capital to Chen (陳). Qin then permanently annexed the vast lands around Dongting Lake, south of the Yangtze River near Anlu (安陸), where the new Nan Commandery (南郡) was established.

==== War against Han and Wei ====
In 301 BC, Qin again attacked Han, led by King Zhaoxiang's uncle, Wei Ran, and occupied the city of Rang (穰城). The city was later given to Wei Ran, who was made chancellor six years later, as his fief. However, in 298 BC, Qin suffered a setback at Hangu Pass under a combined attack from a three-state alliance of Qi, Han and Wei, and was forced to concede the recently occupied Fengling and Wusui back to Wei and Han.

In 293 BC, the states of Han, Wei and East Zhou allied together to attack Qin. King Zhaoxiang appointed the young Bai Qi as general, and defeated the two major states at Yique, killing 240,000 of the enemy and executing the enemy's supreme commander, Gongsun Xi (公孫喜). This was the most devastating blow Qin had delivered to the two eastern states to date. In 292 BC, Bai Qi again led the army and attacked Wei, capturing Weicheng (魏城) and sacking Yuanqu (垣邑). Then in 291 BC, Qin attacked Han again and seized the city of Wan (宛城) and Ye (葉). In 290 BC, King Zhaoxiang sent Sima Cuo (司馬錯), who captured Zhi (軹) from Wei and Deng (鄧) from Han, before joining with Bai Qi to seize Yuanqu again. These successive victories forced Wei to concede 400 li of Hedong lands, and Han to concede 200 li of Wusui lands to Qin.

In 289 BC, King Zhaoxiang sent Bai Qi and Sima Cuo to attack Wei, capturing 61 villages around Zhi. However, in 288 BC, Qin was forced to back down when the five eastern states allied together and threatened to attack Qin again. It did not take long for Qin to strike back, capturing Xinyuan (新垣) and Quyang (曲陽) from Wei in 287 BC, and the former Wei capital Anyi (安邑) in 286 BC. In 283 BC, Qin allied with Zhao and attacked Wei again, capturing Ancheng (安城) with its vanguard reaching near the Wei capital Daliang (大梁).

In 276 BC, King Zhaoxiang once again sent Bai Qi to attack Wei. The following year in 275 BC, he sent his uncle Wei Ran to attack Daliang and killed 40,000 Han reinforcements sent to relieve the siege, forcing Wei to concede eight forts in Wencheng (溫城). Wei Ran attacked Wei again in 274 BC, capturing four cities and killing 40,000 men. In 273 BC, Wei and Zhao allied together to attack the Han city of Huayang (華陽). King Zhaoxiang sent troops to relieve the siege, killing 130,000 Wei soldiers outside Huayang and drowning 20,000 Zhao prisoners, forcing Wei to seek an armistice as well as to cede Nanyang (南陽). Qin attacked Wei again in 268 BC and captured Huaicheng (懷城).

In 266 BC, the Wei national Fan Ju (范雎) fled to Qin after being persecuted and tortured by the Wei chancellor, Wei Qi (魏齊), and vowed revenge upon his home state. He advised King Zhaoxiang about the strategy of "allying distant states while attacking nearby states" (遠交近攻). This advice impressed King Zhaoxiang so much that he appointed him as the chancellor of Qin. In 264 BC, King Zhaoxiang sent Bai Qi to attack Han, capturing nine cities including Xingcheng (陘城) and killing 50,000 of the enemy, enabling Qin to blockade the routes around the southern Taihang Mountains. In 262 BC, Bai Qi attacked Han and captured Yewang (野王), cutting off the Shangdang region from the Han mainland. King Huanhui of Han was fearful of the Qin military prowess and decided to concede Shangdang, but the local commanders refused to do so and instead surrendered the region to the state of Zhao. The struggle for control of Shangdang triggered direct conflicts between Qin and Zhao, then the two largest military powers among the warring states, leading to the devastating Battle of Changping.

In 256 BC, a Qin general named Jiu (摎) attacked Han, killing 40,000 soldiers and capturing Yangcheng (陽城) and Fushu (負黍). Two years later in 254 BC, Jiu attacked Wei and captured Wucheng (吳城), forcing Wei to submit to Qin as a vassal state.

==== Conquest of Yiqu ====
The Yiqu (義渠), also known as "the Rong of Yiqu" (義渠之戎), were a semi-pastoral, semi-agricultural people residing in the region from north of the Jing River to western Hetao. They were historically an offshoot of the nomadic Qiang people living on the grasslands around the Long Mountains during the Shang dynasty, and were frequently at war with the surrounding nomadic tribes such as the Guifang (鬼方) and the Xunyu (獯鬻), as well as the agricultural Huaxia settlements like Bin (豳, the precursor to Zhou). During the reign of King Geng Ding in the late Shang dynasty, faced with a large Northern Di invasion, the aged Duke of Bin Gugong Danfu led his clan south and relocated to Qishan, and the Bin exodus resulted in the area being occupied by Di nomads hostile and stronger than the Yiqu, who temporarily submitted to the Xianyun (獫狁). During the reign of Wu Yi of Shang, Duke Jili of the now renamed state of Zhou attacked and evicted the Di presence from the lands north of Bin with the support of the Shang court, and made the Yiqu subject to Zhou instead. During the reign of Duke Wen of Zhou, Chancellor Jiang Ziya sent ambassador Nangong Kuo to negotiate an alliance with the Yiqu, who assisted Zhou in evicting their rival Guifang, while occupied the fertile Longdong region for themselves. This allowed the Yiqu population to prosper, and after learning agricultural techniques and city building from the Zhou people, they became significantly influenced by Zhou culture. Yiqu hence transformed into a distinctly different culture from other Xirong tribes, though still retaining the tradition of levirate marriage.

After the establishment of the Zhou dynasty, Yiqu initially swore loyalty and participated in multiple Zhou campaigns against the Di and other Rong tribes. In 771 BC, the Marquess of Shen conspired with the Quanrong (犬戎) to sack the Zhou capital city Haojing, killing King You of Zhou and his crown prince Bofu, and the Western Zhou dynasty collapsed. The Yiqu took advantage of the chaos, rebelled and annexed the surrounding four smaller Xirong tribes, and established their own multi-city state centred around modern day Ning County, Gansu, spanning an area of nearly 100,000 square kilometres (39,000 mi^{2}) from the Guyuan grasslands to the west, Qiaoshan to the east, Hetao to the north and the Jing River to the south.

With the old capital city in ruins, the new Zhou king, King Ping, hastily relocated the capital to Luoyi (雒邑), starting the Eastern Zhou dynasty. When King Ping moved east, a minor vassal lord from the land of Qinyi (秦邑), Duke Xiang, provided military escort. To reward Duke Xiang's contribution, King Ping formally granted him a nobility rank and enfeoffed him as a feudal lord, elevating the clan of Qin from a lowly "attached state" (附庸) to a major vassal state. Fearing another barbarian attack from the west and desperately in need of a buffer state, King Ping further promised Duke Xiang that any lands the Qin clan could seize from the Rong tribes west of Qishan (the former heartland of Zhou), they could keep permanently as their own fief. As a marcher clan already with a bitter history with the Xirong tribes, the new noble state of Qin were greatly motivated by this royal promise, and successive generation of Qin rulers died in battle against their Xirong enemy, three of the largest being Mianzhu (綿諸, near modern-day Tianshui), Dali (大荔, near modern-day Dali County), and Yiqu.

Around 650 BC, Yiqu had conquered most of its surrounding smaller tribes and began to expand eastwards, bringing it into direct conflict with the state of Qin. In 651 BC, one of the other larger Xirong tribes, Mianzhu, recruited a Jin man in exile named You Yu (由余) as the ambassador to Qin in order to improve the strained diplomatic relationship. However, You Yu secretly defected and gave counsel to Duke Mu of Qin regarding ways to defeat the Xirong. Using You Yu's advice, Duke Mu sent women and musicians to the king Mianzhu, distracting him from domestic affairs. In 623 BC, Duke Wu led a well-prepared Qin army, invaded and conquered Mianzhu along with over 20 smaller Rong and Di states. Yiqu was among those defeated and forced to claim fealty to Qin's military prowess. For his dominance in the western region, Duke Mu received a golden drum from King Xiang of Zhou as commendation, and was later regarded as one of the Five Hegemons. However, after Duke Mu died, the subsequent Qin rulers were not as competent as their forebear. Being the most sinicized of all Xirong tribes, Yiqu spent the next two centuries slowly building up its strength. In 430 BC, Yiqu invaded Qin territory, forcing Duke Zao of Qin to abandon his lands north of the lower Wei River. The following three decades were the pinnacle of Yiqu power, with its territory doubling to almost 200,000 square kilometres (77,000 sq mi). At this point, Yiqu had become a major threat to Qin, who had to solely focus on dealing with this north-western neighbour and thus became marginalised by other major Central Plain vassals states to the east.

In 361 BC, Duke Xiao of Qin ascended as the ruler of Qin, and appointed Wei Yang in 359 BC, who enacted a series of legalist reforms that greatly strengthened the state of Qin. In 332 BC, King Huiwen of Qin dispatched Gongsun Yan (公孫衍) to attack Wei, killing 80,000 enemies and capturing Xihe Commandery (西河郡) and Shang Commandery (上郡). At the time, Yiqu was having domestic disputes, so the Qin army, with its morale boosted by the recent victories, invaded Yiqu under the pretext of helping to quell Yiqu's chaos. They were able to subject Yiqu to Qin rule. In 327 BC, Qin attacked and seized the city of Yuzhi (郁郅), forcing Yiqu to again swear fealty, this time formally as a Qin county. However, nine years later, in 318 BC, the five eastern states of Wei, Han, Zhao, Yan and Chu allied together and attacked Hangu Pass, forcing the Qin main force to leave its heartland. Yiqu took the opportunity and rebelled, and attacked Qin from the rear as part of a collaboration with the five-state alliance, defeating an undermanned Qin garrison at Libo (李帛). However, the allied five states were soon routed by a Qin counter-offensive led by Chulizi (樗里子, King Huiwen's brother), suffering a loss of 82,000 men. The victorious Qin army then returned and retaliated against Yiqu in 314 BC by invading from three different directions, capturing 25 cities and greatly weakening Yiqu.

In 306 BC, the young King Zhaoxiang ascended to the throne, with his mother Queen Dowager Xuan serving as regent. Knowing Qin could not focus on eradicating Yiqu when it had the hostile eastern states to deal with, and her son's rule was still shaky due to numerous rival princes keen to capture the throne, Queen Dowager Xuan decided to use an approach of pretended conciliation. She invited the king of Yiqu to live long-term in the Ganquan Palace, and consummated a seductive liaison that produced two sons with him. This completely removed the Yiqu King's hostility towards Qin, as the beguiled king had lost all cautiousness around the Queen Dowager. At the same time, King Zhaoxiang was aggressively acting to weaken rival warring states in the east and south, and Queen Dowager Xuan was secretly planning with her son the eventual annihilation of Yiqu.

Finally in 272 BC, Queen Dowager Xuan bared her fangs. She lured the unsuspecting Yiqu King to Ganquan Palace again, and had him assassinated on the spot. Shortly after, the Qin army invaded and overran the leaderless Yiqu, permanently annexing its entire territory into the newly established commanderies of Longxi and Beidi (北地). The Xirong threat that had plagued the state of Qin for over five centuries was removed for good.

==== War against Qi ====
The state of Qin did not share any borders with the state of Qi, but they nevertheless clashed with each other due to the complicated zong-heng diplomacy during the Warring States period.

In 299 BC, King Zhaoxiang invited Lord Mengchang to Qin with the intention of appointing him as chancellor. However, after hearing warnings from his ministers that Lord Mengchang was still loyal to his home state of Qi, which had just soured its diplomatic relationship with Qin, King Zhaoxiang ordered Lord Mengchang to be put under house arrest. Desperate, Lord Mengchang sent a messenger to bribe King's Zhaoxiang's favourite concubine, who demanded a snow fox fur coat, which Lord Mengchang had already given to King Zhaoxiang as a gift when he first arrived and had to steal back from the royal vault. Thanks to the pleas of the concubine, Lord Mengchang was released within two days, and he quickly smuggled himself out of Qin, narrowly evading a small army that King Zhaoxiang had ordered to pursue him. In 298 BC, the disgruntled Lord Mengchang, who was now the newly appointed chancellor of Qi, lobbied for a combined force of Qi, Han and Wei to lay siege to the Qin fortification at Hangu Pass. The allied army managed to penetrate past the Hangu Pass to Yanshi (盐氏), forcing Qin to negotiate an armistice that involved returning the previously occupied Fengling and Wusui back to Wei and Han.

In 288 BC, King Zhaoxiang contacted King Min of Qi and proposed an alliance where both would claim the title "Di", and planned to attack the newly strengthened state of Zhao together. However, King Min was persuaded by Su Qin to renounce his Di title, and instead allied with other states to attack Qin, forcing King Zhaoxiang to also renounce his Di title. At the same time, Qi took the opportunity to conquer its rival state of Song, which made itself a major immediate threat in the eyes of other states.

In 284 BC, King Zhaoxiang sent troops in a five-state alliance of Qin, Yan, Zhao, Wei and Han, led by the Yan general Yue Yi, to attack Qi. Over 70 cities were captured within six months, including its capital Linzi (臨淄), leading to the murder of King Min of Qi by his supposed Chu ally. The two remaining Qi cities Ju and Jimo were then sieged by the allied forces for five years. Qi eventually defeated the allied forces and recaptured lost lands after a routing victory at Jimo by Tian Dan using flaming oxen. However, Qi never regained its former strength and influence, and could no longer pose any geopolitical threat to Qin.

==== War against Zhao ====
In 283 BC, King Zhaoxiang offered to trade fifteen cities in exchange for the Heshibi jade, which was in the state of Zhao's possession. King Huiwen of Zhao was attracted by the offer and agreed to the trade. However, the Zhao ambassador Lin Xiangru (藺相如) figured out that Qin never meant to hold up their end of the deal, and managed to return the jade back to Zhao. During the following three years (282 BC to 280 BC), Qin attacked Zhao multiple times, capturing cities such as Shicheng (石城), Lin (藺), Lishi (離石), Qi (祁) and Guanglang (光狼城), killing 20,000 men, and forcing Zhao to agree to send hostages and concede lands in exchange for returning the captured cities. During the armistice meeting held at Mianchi (澠池), King Zhaoxiang attempted to humiliate King Huiwen, but was forced to back down when Lin Xiangru threatened to physically harm the Qin king.

In 273 BC, Wei and Zhao allied together to attack the Han city of Huayang (華陽). Qin offered military help to Han, defeating and killing 130,000 Wei soldiers, and drowning 20,000 Zhao soldiers in the Yellow River. In 269 BC, King Huiwen of Zhao reneged on his previous promise to send hostages and concede land. In response, Qin attacked Zhao and laid siege to Yuyu (閼與). The siege was lifted after the Zhao general Zhao She (趙奢) ambushed and decisively defeated the invading Qin army. In 265 BC, Qin struck back at Zhao and captured three cities, and King Huiwen of Zhao resorted to sending his son to the state of Qi in exchange for Qi assistance, which forced the Qin army to withdraw.

===== Battle of Changping and the Siege of Handan =====
In 262 BC, Bai Qi attacked and cut off the Shangdang Commandery from the Han mainland. King Huanhui of Han was fearful of Qin military power, and decided to concede Shangdang. However, the local commander Jin Tao (靳黈) refused to do so, thus King Huaihui then replaced him with a new commander Feng Ting (馮亭), but he refused as well and instead suggested surrendering the region to the state of Zhao, with the intention of starting a conflict between Qin and Zhao. Despite opposition from his brother Lord Pingyang (平陽君), King Xiaocheng of Zhao and Lord Pingyuan both decided to accept the annexation of Shangdang by Zhao.

The very next year (261 BC), Qin general Wang He (王齕) attacked Shangdang, and the Zhao general, Lian Po (廉頗), led 200,000 men to reinforce and defend the region, starting the biggest and bloodiest conflict between these two powerful military states. After his vanguard forces suffered numerous setbacks, Lian Po recognized that the Zhao army was underpowered against their Qin enemies in field battles, so he adjusted his strategy and dug in with a 100 li-long defensive line near Changping, deciding to wait out and exhaust the Qin supply lines, which were long and difficult to defend. This strategy worked, as the Qin offensives could not effectively penetrate the well-entrenched Zhao positions for over a year. Logistically strained, the Qin army attempted to engage in pitched battles, but Lian Po consistently refused to meet them in the field. At this point, both sides increased the size of their forces at Changping, with the Zhao numbering 450,000 and the Qin numbering 550,000.

Unable to break the stalemate, Qin began using spies stationed within Zhao to spread rumours about Lian Po being old, cowardly and incompetent. King Xiaocheng believed the rumours, and decided to dismiss Lian Po and replace him with Zhao Kuo (趙括), the son of the late Zhao She, despite objections from chancellor Lin Xiangru and Zhao Kuo's own mother. Zhao Kuo, an arrogant young man with great philosophical knowledge of military strategies but no real combat experience, immediately reversed all of Lian Po's strategic arrangements upon arriving at the frontline. He led the Zhao army away from the protection of Lian Po's defensive structures, and sought to actively engage Qin in pitched battles.

At the same time, King Zhaoxiang of Qin secretly appointed the feared Bai Qi as the new general of the Qin army, and conscripted every Qin man over 15 years of age as auxiliaries. Bai Qi then used feigned defeats to lure the overconfident Zhao Kuo into an ambush, trapping over 400,000 Zhao soldiers in a valley. Zhao Kuo's army, cut off from their base camp, were without supplies for 46 days and became severely demoralised. After multiple failed attempts to breach the Qin lines, Zhao Kuo led a final breakout assault where he was shot dead by Qin archers, along with 200,000 out of the 400,000 Zhao soldiers. Bai Qi then executed the remaining 200,000 Zhao prisoners by burying them alive, sparing only 240 of the youngest men to go back to Zhao to spread the news of the massacre of the Zhao army. The devastating defeat at Changping greatly shocked the state of Zhao, which descended into an atmosphere of despair and sorrow.

Bai Qi wanted to take advantage of the victory at Changping and immediately lay siege to the Zhao capital of Handan (邯鄲). This frightened the states of Zhao and Han greatly, so they sent Su Dai (蘇代, Su Qin's brother) to bribe Fan Ju (范雎, or Fan Sui 范睢), who was then the Qin chancellor and jealous of Bai Qi's military achievement. Fan Ju persuaded King Zhaoxiang to halt the offensives, citing as the reason that the soldiers needed to rest after years of war. Qin agreed to an armistice in exchange of the states of Zhao and Han conceding lands.

Bai Qi was furious at this because he believed Qin had just forfeited a chance to annihilate Zhao once and for all, and resigned his position in protest. However, Zhao soon changed its mind and refused to cede the lands it promised, and attempted to lobby an anti-Qin alliance with the other states. King Zhaoxiang then ordered an attack on Zhao in late 259 BC, laying siege to Handan. He wanted Bai Qi to lead the attack, but the still angry Bai Qi bluntly refused to assume the position citing illness. Instead, he advised King Zhaoxiang to call off the siege as the window of opportunity for an easy victory was already gone, because Lord Pingyuan had managed to secure military reinforcements from Chu and Wei, led by the famous Lord Chunshen and Lord Xinling. King Zhaoxiang did not take in his advice and instead appointed Wang Ling (王陵) as the commander of the siege.

Wang Ling's attack on Handan did not go well due to the fierce Zhao resistance, and King Zhaoxiang again decided to invite Bai Qi to command the siege, but Bai Qi again advised him that Qin had a very low chance of winning this campaign. King Zhaoxiang was unhappy to hear Bai Qi's counsel, so he replaced Wang Lin with Wang He and continued the siege. In 257 BC, the Qin army was suffering losses inflicted by reinforcements from the states of Chu and Wei. King Zhaoxiang then personally visited Bai Qi and attempted to coerce him into taking the command position with royal authority. When Bai Qi once again advised abandoning the siege, King Zhaoxiang was so angry that he stripped Bai Qi's titles and exiled him. Fan Ju then falsely accused to King Zhaoxiang that Bai Qi was cursing the King behind his back, so King Zhaoxiang decreed the forced suicide of Bai Qi. This did not improve the situation for the Qin offensive, and the Qin sustained heavy casualties under the combined assault of Wei, Chu and Zhao, and the Qin army was routed and went into a general retreat. The three-state alliance then pursued and attacked Qin, reinforced by the Han army that had recently joined them. The combined forces recaptured Hedong, Anyang, Taiyuan, Pilao, Wu'an, Shangdang and Runan. The Qin expeditionary force lost most of its men in the retreat. King Zhaoxiang's ignoring of Bai Qi's advice had sown bitter fruits at the end.

In 256 BC, Qin struck back at Zhao again, with general Zhao Chan (趙摻) killing 90,000 men and capturing over 20 counties. Zhao would continue to be at war with Qin into the years following King Zhaoxiang's death, including participating in a fruitless anti-Qin offensive by the five-state alliance in 247 BC, and two major victories against Qin invasions in 240 BC and 231 BC (the latter won by general Li Mu), but it never recovered to its formal glory prior to the Battle of Changping. Meanwhile, Qin had fully regained its strength to become the only dominant military power, and went on to capture the Zhao capital Handan in 229 BC and eventually conquer the whole of Zhao in 222 BC.

==== Conquest of Eastern Zhou ====
The authority of the Zhou court had been declining since the very beginning of the Eastern Zhou dynasty. When King Ping of Zhou abandoned the old capital of Haojing and relocated east to Luoyi, the new capital's crown land (王畿) was significantly smaller and less developed compared to the old capital. The royal Zhou court, which had been humiliated by Haojing's sacking, became increasingly reliant on the support of its vassal states.

King Ping's son, King Huan, later had a falling out with one of the strongest vassals, Duke Zhuang of Zheng. The young King Huan decided to assert his authority as the lord paramount and personally led an expedition in 707 BC to punish the state of Zheng, but was badly defeated in the Battle of Xuge. King Huan himself was wounded in the shoulder by an arrow, and was forced to back down and negotiate peace with Duke Zhuang. This destroyed any remaining prestige and authority the Eastern Zhou royal court had over its vassals, and confirmed the de facto independence of the feudal states. The Zhou court was so impoverished after that defeat that, when King Huan died in 697 BC, it took the court seven years to afford a fitting royal funeral.

During the reign of King Xiang of Zhou, his half-brother Prince Dai (王子帶) twice attempted to usurp the throne in 649 BC and 635 BC, both times by conspiring with the Quanrong to lay siege to the capital. King Xiang required military assistance from the vassal states to reinstate himself on both occasions, and was forced to increase the size of their fiefs each time as commendations. This further weakened the image of the Eastern Zhou court in the eyes of the vassal states, and progressively relegated it to the status of a neglected figurehead.

The situation only became worse for the Eastern Zhou court after the Spring and Autumn period ended. None of the warring states held any respect for the Zhou, and marginalized the Zhou court to the de facto status equivalent of a minor vassal state. During the reign of King Kao of Zhou, he granted a portion of crown land around Wangcheng (王城, the older of Luoyi's twin cities) to his brother Ji Xie (姬揭) in 440 BC, naming the fief "the state of West Zhou" (西周國). In 367 BC during the reign of King Xian of Zhou, the 2nd duke of West Zhou, Duke Wei (西周威公) died, and one of his younger sons, Lord Gen (公子根), rebelled against his brother Duke Hui (西周惠公) and seceded a portion of his home state centred around Gong (鞏地) with the support of Marquess Cheng of Zhao (趙成侯) and Marquess Gong of Han (韓共侯), naming it the "state of East Zhou" (東周國). This created two separate vassal states out of the Eastern Zhou royal court, further decreasing the dynasty's crown land.

In 344 BC, Marquess Hui of Wei gathered other vassal lords to pay a visit to King Xian of Zhou, but instead used the occasion to declare himself king. This initially backfired and caused other states to turn hostile towards Wei, but in 334 BC Duke Wei of Qi openly supported King Hui of Wei's crowning, and declared himself king as well, prompting the state of Chu to attack Qi with the intention of forcing Qi to abandon the title of king. However, in 325 BC Duke Huiwen of Qin also declared himself a king and supported Qi's crowning, and King Hui of Wei openly encouraged Marquess Wei of Han to claim the title as well, who accepted the proposal and crowned himself in 323 BC along with the rulers of Yan and Zhongshan. Out of all of the major states, only Marquess Wuling of Zhao refused to declare himself a king at that time, as he considered his state too weak to handle the diplomatic fallout, and titled himself "Lord" (君) instead. By this point, nearly all of the major states had claimed royal status equivalent to that of the King of Zhou, and it effectively spelled the complete death of Zhou authority.

In 315 BC, the two splinter states of East Zhou and West Zhou declared autonomy and divided up the remaining crown lands between themselves, reducing the King of Zhou, whose seat, Chengzhou, was within East Zhou, to a puppet at the mercy of the duke's charity. When King Nan of Zhou ascended in 314 BC, he was expelled by the Duke of East Zhou, who no longer wanted to provide for a less than useful monarch. King Nan was forced to beg for protection from the Duke of West Zhou, and moved out of Chengzhou to Wangcheng.

In 307 BC, King Nan of Zhou hosted King Wu of Qin, who just returned victorious against Han at the Battle of Yiyang. During the visit, King Wu, a keen wrestler, decided to try lifting the "dragon-patterned red cauldron" (龍紋赤鼎) in the Zhou palace. He died from the attempt, bleeding from his eyes and breaking his shin bones. After the childless King Wu died, his hostage half-brother Ying Ji returned to claim the throne as King Zhaoxiang.

In 293 BC, East Zhou decided to ally itself with the states of Han and Wei, and sent troops to help attacking Qin. However, the combined forces of this alliance was destroyed at Yique by the young Qin general Bai Qi, with 240,000 men killed and their commander Gongsun Xi (公孫喜) captured and executed. After this loss, the East Zhou was unable to actively participate in future interstate struggles in any significant fashion.

In 256 BC, Duke Wu of West Zhou (西周武公) allied with other states to stop the Qin offensive on the Han city of Yangcheng. In retaliation, King Zhaoxiang of Qin sent general Jiu to invade West Zhou, successfully breaking into Wangcheng. The Duke Wu was taken to Xianyang to beg for mercy, conceding all his lands. Both King Nan and Duke Wu would die later that year, and the subsequent Duke of West Zhou, Duke Wen (西周文公), was exiled to Danhuju (憚狐聚). Because the Zhou royal court had fallen from power and King Nan had died without a successor, the Eastern Zhou dynasty collapsed, ending 879 years of Zhou monarchy. The remaining East Zhou state was also conquered by Qin chancellor Lü Buwei seven years later in 249 BC during the reign of King Zhaoxiang's grandson King Zhuangxiang, after Duke Jing of East Zhou attempted to form an anti-Qin alliance with other states.

== Legacy ==
King Zhaoxiang died at age 75 in 251 BC, having outlived his eldest son, who died in 267 BC while serving as a hostage in the state of Wei. He was succeeded by his second son King Xiaowen.

Reigning for over 55 years, he was one of the longest-serving rulers during the Eastern Zhou dynasty. Although making numerous policy mistakes during his later years, his aggressive territorial expansions were pivotal in consolidating the state of Qin as the dominant military powerhouse of the late Warring States period. It was the strategic dominance established during his reign that paved the way for Qin's eventual successful unification of China under his great-grandson, Ying Zheng.

== Family ==
Queens:

- Queen Yeyang (葉陽后)
- Queen Dowager Tang, of the Tang lineage (唐太后 唐氏), the mother of Crown Prince Zhu

Sons:

- First son (d. 267 BC)
  - Known by his posthumous title, Crown Prince Dao (悼太子)
- Second son, Crown Prince Zhu (太子柱; 302–250 BC), ruled as King Xiaowen of Qin in 250 BC
  - Known by his prior title, Lord Anguo (安國君)

Daughters:

- A daughter who married King Kaolie of Chu (278–238 BC) in 271 BC, and had issue (Lord Changping)

== In fiction and popular culture ==
- Portrayed by Bao Guo'an in Changping of the War (2004)
- Portrayed by Zhu Yilong in The Legend of Mi Yue (2015)
- Portrayed by Zhang Bo (actor) in The Qin Empire III (2017)
- In the Manga and Anime titled Kingdom, he was known as "King Sho/Zhao", and he was described as the God of War. He led the battles against rival kingdoms in every turn. Also established the "Six Greats Generals" military system in Qin, independent generals who are free to wage war against rival States.

== See also ==
- Battle of Changping

King Zhaoxiang of Qin House of Ying Born: 325 BC Died: 251 BC
Regnal titles
Preceded by King Wu	King of Qin; 306–251 BC	Succeeded by King Xiaowen
