= 260 BC =

260 BC in various calendars
Gregorian calendar	260 BC; CCLX BC
Ab urbe condita	494
Ancient Egypt era	XXXIII dynasty, 64
Pharaoh	Ptolemy II Philadelphus, 24
Ancient Greek Olympiad (summer)	130th Olympiad (victor)¹
Assyrian calendar	4491
Balinese saka calendar	N/A
Bengali calendar	−853 – −852
Berber calendar	691
Buddhist calendar	285
Burmese calendar	−897
Byzantine calendar	5249–5250
Chinese calendar	庚子年 (Metal Rat); 2438 or 2231 — to — 辛丑年 (Metal Ox); 2439 or 2232
Coptic calendar	−543 – −542
Discordian calendar	907
Ethiopian calendar	−267 – −266
Hebrew calendar	3501–3502
- Hindu calendars
Vikram Samvat	−203 – −202
Shaka Samvat	N/A
Kali Yuga	2841–2842
Holocene calendar	9741
Iranian calendar	881 BP – 880 BP
Islamic calendar	908 BH – 907 BH
Javanese calendar	N/A
Julian calendar	N/A
Korean calendar	2074
Minguo calendar	2171 before ROC 民前2171年
Nanakshahi calendar	−1727
Seleucid era	52/53 AG
Thai solar calendar	283–284
Tibetan calendar	ལྕགས་ཕོ་བྱི་བ་ལོ་ (male Iron-Rat) −133 or −514 or −1286 — to — ལྕགས་མོ་གླང་ལོ་ (female Iron-Ox) −132 or −513 or −1285

Year 260 BC was a year of the pre-Julian Roman calendar. At the time it was known as the Year of the Consulship of Asina and Duilius (or, less frequently, year 494 Ab urbe condita). The denomination 260 BC for this year has been used since the early medieval period, when the Anno Domini calendar era became the prevalent method in Europe for naming years.

== Events ==
=== By place ===
==== Sicily ====
- The Roman advance continues westward from Agrigentum with their forces relieving the besieged cities of Segesta and Macella. These cities have sided with the Roman cause, and have come under Carthaginian attack for doing so.
- Hannibal Gisco returns to fight in Sicily as the admiral in charge of the Carthaginian fleet in the Strait of Messina. With the Romans about to launch their first ever navy, Carthage is determined that this innovation be thwarted. Gisco defeats part of the Roman fleet and captures the Roman consul Gnaeus Cornelius Scipio Asina in an encounter near Lipari; the consul's nickname Asina (which means donkey) is earned in this encounter. However, this Carthaginian victory is of limited practical value as the bulk of the Roman fleet continues to manoeuvre in the surrounding waters.
- Confident in Carthage's superiority at sea, Hannibal Gisco deploys his ships for the Battle of Mylae in the traditional long line arrangement. Although inexperienced in sea battles, the Romans, led by consul Gaius Duilius Nepos, heavily defeat the Carthaginian fleet, mainly due to the innovative use of land tactics in naval warfare (including the use of the grappling irons and the corvus boarding bridge).
- Having lost the confidence of his peers, Hannibal Gisco is subsequently executed for incompetence shortly afterwards, together with other defeated Punic generals.
- In the north of Sicily, the Romans, with their northern sea flank secured by their naval victory in the Battle of Mylae, advance toward Thermae. They are defeated there by the Carthaginians under Hamilcar.

==== Egypt ====
- Callimachus of Cyrene, learned poet and grammarian, becomes chief librarian at the Library of Alexandria.

==== China ====
- Battle of Changping between the state of Qin and state of Zhao:

- Frustrated with the stalemate and encouraged by Qin spies, King Xiaocheng of Zhao replaces general Lian Po with the less cautious Zhao Kuo. Hearing of this, King Zhaoxiang of Qin secretly sends the famous general Bai Qi to take control of the Qin army.
- The Qin army under Bai Qi destroys the army of Zhao, establishing Qin's military superiority over all other Chinese states during the Warring States period. The battle takes place near modern-day Gaoping in Shanxi and hundreds of thousands of soldiers from Zhao are executed after the battle.

== Births ==
- Zheng, who will later become king of the State of Qin, and then later the First Emperor of China (d. 210 BC)

== Deaths ==
- Hannibal Gisco, Carthaginian military commander in charge of both land armies and naval fleets (b. c. 300 BC)
- Orontes III, king of Armenia and Sophene (modern-day Turkey)
- Timocharis of Alexandria, Greek astronomer and philosopher
- Zhao Kuo, Chinese general of the State of Zhao
