= Battle of Handan =

Military engagement (259 BC - 257 BC)

- Part of Warring States Period
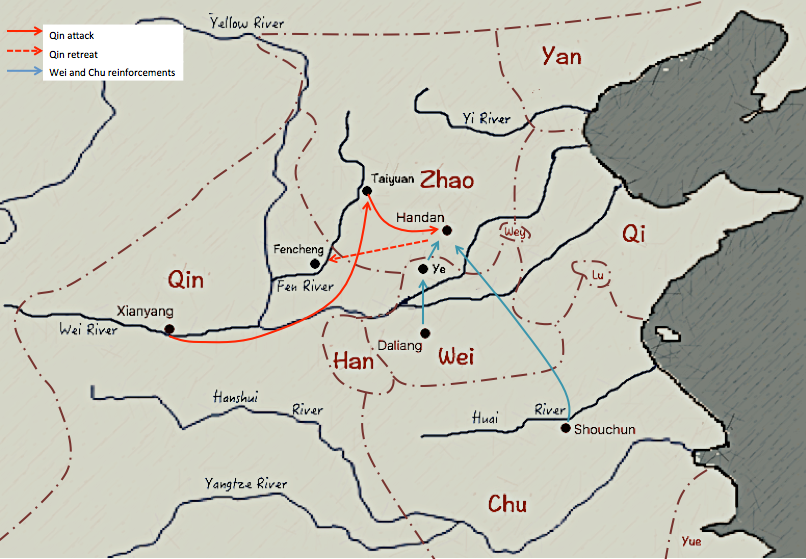
- Battle of Handan
Date	259 BCE – 257 BCE
Location	Handan
Result	Allied Zhao, Wei and Chu victory: Qin expansion temporarily halted

Belligerents
Qin	Zhao; Wei; Chu

Commanders and leaders
Wang Ling; Wang He; Zheng Anping (surrendered)	Zhao: King Xiaocheng; Lian Po; Lord Pingyuan; Wei: Lord Xinling; Chu: Lord Chunshen

Strength
Qin: 650,000	Zhao: All forces Wei: 80,000; Chu: 100,000

Casualties and losses
Qin suffered a major defeat, which was rare in the late Warring States period.	Zhao slightly recovered from the Battle of Changping and managed to survive for several more decades.

The Battle of Handan began in 259 BC and concluded in 257 BC, during which the garrison of Handan, the capital city of Zhao, joined by the allied force of Wei and Chu, defeated the invading army of Qin. It was one of the most remarkable failures of the Qin army after the Reform of Shang Yang.

== Background ==
Just months prior to the siege, Zhao suffered a major loss in Battle of Changping, during which more than 400,000 soldiers were killed by the Qin army led by Bai Qi. When the state of Zhao was still in pain, Qin launched another attack towards the Shangdang region of Zhao. Qin quickly captured Pilao and Taiyuan which caused panic in the Zhao and Han states. To stop Qin's invasion, Han and Zhao ceded several towns to Qin. Fan Ju, the chancellor of Qin, argued that the Qin should accept those towns and stop the military campaign, while the general Bai Qi wanted to keep on invading those two states aiming to wipe them out completely. King Zhaoxiang of Qin accepted Fan Ju's strategy and stopped the campaign, which caused some conflict between Fan Ju and Bai Qi.

When King Xiaocheng of Zhao planned to cede six towns according to the treaty, some governors stopped him. A governor called Yu Qing told the king that ceding towns to Qin would only make Qin a bigger threat. He suggested that instead of ceding six towns to Qin, Zhao should cede six towns to Qi in order to gain the support from the powerful state in the east. Meanwhile, Zhao should form an allied force with Han, Wei, Yan and Chu to stop the eastward expansion of Qin together. The king took Yu Qing's suggestion and began to prepare for a potential total conflict against Qin.

Qin was annoyed by Zhao's refusal to cede six towns as promised. The king of Qin decided to launch another war. He wanted to make Bai Qi the general, but Bai Qi refused because he knew that this was not a good time to defeat Zhao since Zhao was well prepared and was allied with other states.

== War ==
=== Siege of Handan ===
In July of 259 BC, Qin restarted the war against Zhao, with Wang Ling appointed commander. Wang led the Qin troops to the Zhao capital Handan and besieged the city. However, he was unable to breach the city's walls for almost two years, and five of his vice generals were killed in the battle. The king of Qin asked Bai Qi to replace Wang Ling but Bai Qi refused once more. Then, the king sent Wang He to the frontline to reinforce Wang Ling.

=== Call for help from Chu and Wei ===
In 258 BC, Zhao decided to call for help from Chu and Wei. The king of Zhao sent Lord Pingyuan to Chu to ask for the reinforcements. Lord Pingyuan planned to select 20 assistants from his entourage but only 19 spots were filled. A courtier named Mao Sui recommended himself to be the 20th assistant. Lord Pingyuan said, "Talent is to a person what a pin is to a bag. The pin would break the bag no matter what, so people would see it. Talent could not be hidden. You have been here for three years but you have done nothing amazing. If you were talented, I should have noticed it." Mao Sui said, "You never saw the pin of my talent because you have never put it into a bag." Lord Pingyuan thought it was a good reply, so he let Mao Sui go with him.

After Lord Pingyuan arrived at the Chu capital city of Chu, King Kaolie of Chu granted him an audience. The two discussed the matter for the entire morning without reaching a conclusion. Mao Sui drew his sword and approached the king of Chu, yelling at the king, "This matter can be decided in two sentences, but you have been talking for the entire morning. Why?" The king of Chu asked, "Who is this man?" Lord Pingyuan answered, "He is one of my assistants." The king said, "I am talking to your master, who are you to yell at me?" Mao Sui answered, "You are respected by others because you are the king of Chu, a state with great military strength. However, at the present, I am only five steps away from you, so your soldiers could not save you if I kill you. Now you should listen to me." Then he listed importance and benefits of rescuing Zhao. The king of Chu was impressed, so he agreed to send an army of 100,000 soldiers, led by Lord Chunshen, to Handan to fight along with Zhao.

At the same time, the wife of Lord Pingyuan wrote to the king of Wei to ask for help. Her younger brother was Lord Xinling of the state of Wei. Wei agreed to send 80,000 men to Handan to rescue Zhao. This troop was led by general Jin Bi. When the Qin learned of this, they threatened to attack Wei after wiping out Zhao. The king of Wei was scared, so he asked Jin Bi to stop advancing. Jin Bi set up camp at the city of Ye and stopped marching towards Handan. Lord Xinling tried to persuade the king of Wei to continue supporting Zhao, but the king refused. Therefore, Lord Xinling decide to lead his courtiers (about 100 chariots) to Handan in order to save his sister, even though he knew that this would be more like a suicide attack.

When Lord Xinling left the Wei capital, the gatekeeper Hou Sheng bid him farewell in chilly fashion. Lord Xinling was disturbed: he had previously treated Hou Sheng well, but now that he was going off to die, it was unusual for Hou Sheng to react the way he did. He turned his force around and consulted Hou Sheng, who advised him to steal the Tiger Seal (虎符) from the Wei king, then use the seal to wrest control of Jin Bi's army. Lord Xinling asked the Wei king's concubine, Ruji, to do the deed. Ruji was successful. Before departing, Hou Sheng further advised Lord Xinling to bring his man Zhu Hai along, to kill Jin Bi if the latter did not hand over command of the army.

When Lord Xinling arrived at Ye, Jin Bi confirmed that the Tiger Seal was genuine, but he was suspicious because it was unusual for the Wei king to send a small entourage to take command of an army as large as his. On hearing this, Zhu Hai killed Jin Bi and Lord Xinling took command of the army. The Wei army then continued marching towards Handan.

=== Defeat of Qin ===
In December of 257 BC, the Wei and Chu armies arrived at Handan. They launched an attack on the rear of Qin army while Lord Pingyuan led a sortie of 3,000 soldiers from the besieged city. The army of Qin was defeated. Wang He and the remnant of Qin army retreated to Fencheng, while the vice general of Qin, Zheng Anping, surrendered to Zhao.

== Influences ==
King Zhaoxiang of Qin was enraged by the result of the war. He decided that Bai Qi was the one to blame since he refused to be the commander. Later, he forced Bai Qi to commit suicide. Fan Ju was also blamed by the king and lost the position of chancellor.

The state of Zhao survived the total attack. It would last for about 30 years before being eventually conquered by Qin in 222 BC (Handan was captured in 228 BC).
