= Zhao Weihou =

Zhao Weihou (赵威后) was a Chinese empress. She was known by many titles, possibly including Empress Dowager, Empress Dowager Xiaowei, the Queen of King Huiwen of Zhao, King Xiaocheng of Zhao, Chang Anjun, Fuling Jun. She was the mother of Yan Wucheng. After the death of Hui Wenwang, she entered politics in her early thirties.

History reveals two records of her actions in the period of her rule (which was one year). One record claimed that she was a dragon. In another record, she consulted the king, though the name of the king is unknown. Supposedly, Zhao Weihou died one year after she took office, and her son Xiao Cheng Wang began on the side of a democratic government.

== Qin attack ==
In 266 BC, Zhao Huiwen died and Prince Dan took over as King Xiaocheng of Zhao. While Xiaocheng was young, national affairs were represented by Zhao Weihou. Zhao Weihou valued the people's livelihood and was sympathetic to them, increasing her prestige. At that time, although Zhao had Lin Xiangru, Lianpo, and the plains supported the facade, their national strength was not as good as before. After Zhao Weihou took power, the Qin sent troops to attack Zhao. Zhao did not have the strength to confront the Qin State and had to ask for help from Qi. The state of Qi wanted Zhao Weihou’s son Changan Jun as a hostage before they were willing to send troops. Zhao Weihou loved her son and refused to do so. Chu Long then convinced Zhao Weihou to send her son over, and Changan Jun was sent to Qi as a hostage, and Qi sent troops to save Zhao.
