= King Huiwen =

King Huiwen may refer to:

- King Huiwen of Qin (reigned 338–311 BC)
- King Huiwen of Zhao (reigned 298-266 BC)
