= Wei Zi =

Chinese actor (born 1956)

- Born: 王巍 (Wáng Wēi); 1956 (age 69–70); Ningxia, China
- Occupation: Actor
- Years active: 1988 – present
- Awards: Plum Blossom Awards; Best Actor; 1988 Stories of Mulberry Village

Wei Zi (Chinese: 巍子; pinyin: Wēi Zǐ; born January 1956) is a Chinese film and television actor.

== Early life ==
Born and raised in Ningxia, he was originally named Wang Wei (Chinese: 王巍; pinyin: Wáng Wēi).

=== Education ===
He graduated from the Ningxia College of Art in 1978 and was assigned to the Ningxia Repertory Theatre the same year.

In 1985, he was accepted to the Central Theatre Academy. It was one of the two higher educational institutions of modern theatre in entire China and highly professional coming only second to the Shanghai Theatre Academy.

In January 1989, Wei Zi was admitted to Beijing People's Art Theatre, a first-rate national theatre company of China where he was recognized as a National Class-A Actor (国家一级演员). He left BPAT in 1994.

== Career ==
=== Early work ===
For his 1988 university graduation, it was required for the students to perform in a play entitled "Stories of Mulberry Village" based on Zhu Xiaoping's three novellas about hardship and struggles in a village in Northern China. Wei played the role of a lunatic farmer and received the highest score for his performance. Later the play went public and unprecedentedly was a huge success. People's Daily described it as "Turning a New Leaf of China's Modern Theatre" and senior authorities such as drama master and Beijing People's Art Theater president Cao Yu and vice-president of the Chinese Film Artists' Association Chen Huangmei who seldom seen in public events attended the performance. Wei was and won the Plum Blossom Award for the best performer in 1988.

Wei's first appearance in front of the camera dates back to 1989 when he acted in the "Ballad of the Yellow River", a film by the famous director Teng Wenji which describes the past lives of the people living along the old course of the Yellow River. It won the Best Director Award in the 14th Montréal World Film Festival . Their cooperation continued in 1996 with "The Conqueror" and "The Story of Xiangxiang" and again in 2005 with another Montréal World Film Festival nominee "Sunrise, Sunset".

=== Other activities ===
In 1992 he starred in his second movie "The Scientist Jiang Zhuying", a biographical based on the true life of Jiang Zhuying for which he was nominated for a best actor award at the Golden Rooster Awards. The film itself was awarded the Best Feature Film Prize by the Ministry of Radio, Film, and Television . The same year Wei Zi appeared in his first TV drama entitled "Qing Man Zhu Jiang". In 1994 he was nominated again for the best actor award at the Golden Rooster Awards for his notable performance in the movie "Stay in the Village".

In 2000, China Central Television (CCTV) decided to produce a mainland adaptation of one of Jin Yong's Wuxia novels entitled The Smiling, Proud Wanderer. Wei Zi was offered the role of the negative character of the novel Yue Buqun because the director Huang Jianzhong believed that he was the only one who could perform that difficult character very well . At first Wei Zi showed no interest in it since it was a martial arts themed project but agreed to read the script. Upon reading the scenario he noticed the dual characteristics of the hypocrite Yue Buqun who was wearing a gentleman's face while a devil was hidden inside him. Wei Zi found this a challenging role and finally expressed his acceptance of doing it. His successful development of the character was received quite well by both the audience and the critics and paved the way more for his further presence in the TV dramas. "The Great Dunhuang", "The Red Merchant Hu Xue Yan", "Thrill", "Betrayal", "The World's First Restaurant" and "DA Division" are some of his other notable series in the 21st century.

== Filmography ==
=== Film ===
Year	Title	Role	Notes
1989	Huanghe Yao 黄河谣	Danggui	
1993	The Scientist Jiang Zhuying 蒋筑英	Jiang Zhuying	
1994	Xiangxiang Renews Oil Vender 香香闹油坊	He Dawang	
1994	Conqueror 征服者		
1994	The Day the Sun Turned Cold 天国逆子	Lover	
1994	Stay in Village 留村察看	Jian Zheng	
1998	Green Snake Assassin 青蛇杀手		
2005	Sunrise, Sunset 日出日落		
2006	Winter Waltz 冬天的华尔兹		
2013	Crimes of Passion		

=== Television ===
Year	Title	Role	Notes
1992	Qing Man Zhujiang 情满珠江	Lin Bicheng	
1994	Fei Jia You Nü 费家有女		
1995	Beijing Shenqiu De Gushi 北京深秋的故事		also known as Dushi Ping'an Ye (都市平安夜)
1997	Thousand Years 百年沉浮	Pei Yijiang	
1998	Shanghai Cangsang 上海沧桑	Tang Tongshu	
1998	Fengyu Aomen 风雨澳门	Li Jinyun	
1999	Bairi Zhuizong 百日追踪	Wei Bingnan	
1999	Meiyou Jiayuan De Linghun 没有家园的灵魂	Zhang Shaojie	
1999	Shengsi Jiaoliang 生死较量	Yang Yisong	
2000	Laughing in the Wind 笑傲江湖	Yue Buqun	
2001	Betrayal 背叛	Song Yikun	
2001	Soft Pitfall 温柔陷阱	Zhang Dawei	
2001	Feichang Jiechu 非常接触	Lei Heping	
2002	DA Shi; DA师	Zhao Ziming	
2002	Days of Passion and Spirit 激情岁月	Wei Yanzhou	
2002	The Price of Glory 刺虎	Yongzheng Emperor	
2003	Wolong Xiao Zhuge 卧龙小诸葛		
2003	Hong Qi Pu 红旗谱	Feng Guitang	
2003	Changping of the War 铁血长平	Bai Qi	
2003	The World's First Restaurant 天下第一楼	Lu Mengshi	
2004	Lihun Zai Hun 离婚再婚		also known as Nüren Buhao Re (女人不好惹)
2004	The Red Merchant Hu Xueyan 红顶商人胡雪岩	Hu Xueyan	
2005	Blossom of Hibiscus Flowers 芙蓉花开	Su Shilong	
2005	The Great Dunhuang 大敦煌	Liang Moyan	
2005	Fanhei Shiming 反黑使命		
2005	Undercover Swordsman 剑出江南	Prince of Ning	
2006	Weixian Guanxi 危险关系	Su Shilong	
2006	Chuan Zheng Fengyun 船政风云	Shen Baozhen	
2006	Xuese Shaji 血色杀机		
2006	Xuese Nianhua 血色年华		
2007	Wang Zhaojun 王昭君	Shepherd	
2007	Shanghai Wang 上海王	Chang Lixiong	
2007	Qinhuai Beige 秦淮悲歌	Qian Muzhai	
2007	Menghui Chun Gu 梦回春谷	Master Xie	
2007	Xuanfeng Bao 旋风暴	Yan Zhanfei	also known as Canghai Yingxiong (沧海英雄)
2007	Thrill 心跳	Zhou Zhilong	also known as Zhenfeng Xiangdui (针锋相对)
2007	Juechu Fengsheng 绝处逢生		also known as Chun Xia Qiu Dong (春夏秋冬)
2008	Lang Yan 狼烟	Zhongtian Yingxiu	
2008	Tai'an Tang Yu Jing Chuanqi 太安堂玉井传奇	Ke Yujing	
2008	Qiongtu Molu 穷途末路	Zhang Shaojie	
2008	Xiongbing Chuji 雄兵出击		also known as Tejing Xiongfeng (特警雄风)
2008	Jinqu 禁区	Xu Hangzhou	
2009	Tie Lihua 铁梨花	Zhao Yuangeng	
2009	Dixia Dishang 地下地上	Xu Yinchu	
2010	Jiang Jun 将·军	Guo Jingyu	
2010	Shangri-La 香格里拉	Lecangduoji	
2011	Journey to the West 西游记	Jade Emperor	
2012	Chinese Traditional Magic 大戏法	Shen Wankui	
2013	Dagougun 打狗棍	Dai Tianli	

== Notable stage performances ==
- Stories of Mulberry Village 《桑树坪纪事》 (1988)
- Tiger Tally 《虎符》

== Sources ==
- Fei, Faye C; William H. Sun (1994). ""Stories of Mulberry Village" and the End of Modern Chinese Theatre". TDR. 38 (2): 131–137. doi:10.2307/1146336. JSTOR 1146336.
- Xu, Linzheng (2005-08-10). "Late Bloomer Wei Zi: From the First Level Actor to Entrepreneur 巍子：从一级演员到个体户" (in Chinese). Sina.
- "Wei Zi 巍子" (in Chinese). China Movie Database.
- "Wei Zi 巍子" (in Chinese). MdbChina. Archived from the original on 2008-03-06.
