= Xu Huanshan =

Chinese actor and director

- Born: 13 July 1937 (age 87); Beijing, China
- Occupation(s): Actor, director
- Years active: 1979–present

Chinese name
- Traditional Chinese: 許還山
- Simplified Chinese: 许还山
Transcriptions
Standard Mandarin
- Hanyu Pinyin: Xǔ Huánshān

Xu Huanshan (born 13 July 1937) is a Chinese actor and occasional film director. Xu was enrolled in the Beijing Film Academy in 1956. A year later, he was labelled as a "rightist" and was sent for "re-education through labour" under the Communist government's Anti-Rightist Movement. In 1966, he was sent to Xinjiang to perform hard labour. He returned to Beijing in 1979 and started his acting career. In 1980, he joined the Xi'an Film Production Company (西安电影制片厂) as an actor, and six years later he became a film director. He is best known for playing supporting roles in many television series.

== Filmography ==
=== Film ===
Year	Title	Role	Notes
1979	Ying 樱	Chen Jianhua	
1981	Guisu 归宿	Yang Zhihe	
1981	Awakening 苏醒	Tian Zhonghua	
1983	Zhang Heng 张衡	Zhang Heng	
1984	Shuangxiong Hui 双雄会	Li Zicheng	
1984	Cold Night 寒夜	Wang Wenxuan	
1985	Anecdote of State Yue 古越轶事	King Goujian of Yue	
1985	Daili Shizhang 代理市长	Luo Ting	
1986	Xingyun De Ren 幸运的人	Huang Yanfu	
1987	Hong Yu Bai 红与白	Pan Yiding	
1987	Mangliu 盲流		director
1991	Decisive Engagement II: The Wei Hai Campaign 大决战第二部 淮海战役	Huang Baitao	
1991	Meng Duan Lou Lan 梦断楼兰	Ma Zhankui	
1991	Fazi Ke 筏子客	Dabashi	
1993	First Attraction 第一诱惑	Zhao Fengzhi	
1993	A Warrior's Tragedy 边城浪子	Ma Hung-kwan	
1993	Huoche, Zai Liming Daoda 火车,在黎明到达		
1995	Renzhe Wudi 仁者无敌		
1996	Signal Left, Turn Right 红灯停绿灯行	Chief editor	
1998	Shiji Zhi Meng 世纪之梦		
2007	The Romantic Fool 那个傻瓜爱过你		
2009	The Founding of a Republic 建国大业	Yu Youren	
2010	Confucius 孔子	Laozi	
2011	White Deer Plain 白鹿原	Guo Juren	
2012	Hsue-Chen Tsien 钱学森	Qian Xuesen (old age)	
2012	Full Circle 飞越老人院	Ge	
2013	72 Hours of Sword Robbing		
2014	The Struggle of 80's		
2014	Once Upon a Time in the Old Bridge		
2016	Song of the Phoenix 百鸟朝凤		

=== Television ===
Year	Title	Role	Notes
(Unknown)	Suxing 苏醒		
(Unknown)	Laozu 老祖		
(Unknown)	Zhuqing Suiyue 铸情岁月		director
(Unknown)	Tianmeng 天梦		director
1986	The Man and the Monkey 人猴		
1993	Dawu De Yahuan Men 大屋的丫环们		
1994	Da Shanghai Wuzhan Xia 大上海屋檐下	Shen Boxuan	
1995	Sima Qian 司马迁	Emperor Wu of Han	
1997	Yapian Zhanzheng Yanyi 鸦片战争演义	Lin Zexu	
1998	Lü Hou Chuanqi 吕后传奇	Liu Bang	
1999	Zhuangzhi Lingyun 壮志凌云		
1999	Gonghe Guo Wangshi 共和国往事	Sun Likun	
2000	Basui Longye Nao Dongjing 八岁龙爷闹东京	Li Gu	
2000	Juntong Ju De Qiangsheng 军统局的枪声	Qi Xiaoxuan	
2001	Bingtang Hulu 冰糖葫芦	Gao Zhixing	
2001	Soldiers of Huang Pu 黄埔军人		
2001	Jiangshan Weizhong 江山为重	Kangxi Emperor	
2002	Richu 日出	Pan Yueting	
2002	Yuba Buneng 欲罢不能		guest star
2002	Ju Bao Pen 聚宝盆	Liu Bowen	
2003	Xiaozhuang Mishi 孝庄秘史	Nurhaci	
2003	Wu Yan Nü 无盐女	Zhou Tong	
2003	Demi-Gods and Semi-Devils 天龙八部	Wuyazi	
2003	Gongting Huashi Langshining 宫廷画师郎世宁	Kangxi Emperor	
2004	Changping of the War 铁血长平	King Huiwen of Zhao	
2004	Shoufu 首富	Xuan Yicheng	
2004	Bishu Shanzhuang Da Chuanqi 避暑山庄大传奇	Kangxi Emperor	
2004	Tianshan Jinji Chudong 天山紧急出动	Liu Jianhua / Wen Shibin	
2004	Guanzhong Feishi 关中匪事	Zhao	
2005	Dixue Dahankou 喋血大汉口	Sima Hao	
2005	Shaolin King of Martial Arts 少林武王	Old Man	
2005	Li Jian 砺剑	Qin Haichuan	
2006	Dongfang Bazhu 东方霸主	Guan Zhennan	
2006	Chuan Zheng Fengyun 船政风云	Li Hongzhang	
2006	The Qin Empire 大秦帝国	Duke Xian of Qin	
2007	The Legend and the Hero 封神榜之凤鸣岐山	Wen Zhong	
2007	Shang Gu Jiangjun 商贾将军	Luo Wenchuan	
2007	Lie Hu 猎狐	Engineer Wang	
2008	Fating Fengyun 法庭风云		
2008	Hubu Dieying 狐步谍影	Xiubote	
2009	The Dream of Red Mansions 红楼梦	Jia Zheng	
2009	Xuese Chenxiang 血色沉香	Ye Gong	
2009	Tiandi Minxin 天地民心	Jiaqing Emperor	
2010	Tiantang Xiu 天堂秀	Yuan Sicheng	
2010	Journey to the West 西游记	Subhuti	
2010	A Legend of Shaolin Temple 3 少林寺传奇3	Zhu Zaixiu	
2011	Caogen Wang 草根王	Huo Yishou	
2011	Hongse Lijian 红色利剑	Li Hongji	
2011	Zhongguo 1945 Zhi Chongqing Fengyun 中国1945之重庆风云	Zhang Lan	
2011	Yang Naiwu Yu Xiaobaicai Yuan'an 杨乃武与小白菜冤案	Ding Baozhen	
2011	Da Tang Nüjiang Fan Lihua 大唐女将樊梨花	Huang Ao	
2011	Qiangpao Hou 枪炮侯	Li Hongzhang	
