= The Qin Empire (TV series) =

- DVD cover art
- 大秦帝国之裂变
- Genre: Historical drama
- Developed by: Qin Zhengui; Zhang Jie; Wang Hao
- Screenplay by: Sun Haohui
- Story by: Sun Haohui
- Directed by: Huang Jianzhong; Yan Yi
- Creative directors: Jin Xiwu; Ma Yingbo
- Presented by: Peng Jianming; Wang Guangqun; Duan Xiannian; Li Ruigang; Liu Bin; Wang Yaxing; Qu Xiangjun; Jiao Yang
- Starring: Hou Yong; Wang Zhifei; Gao Yuanyuan; Du Yulu; Lü Zhong; Sun Feihu; Xu Huanshan; You Yong
- Ending theme: "A Great Wind Comes Forth and the Clouds Rise High" (大风起兮云飞扬) by Liao Changyong and Tan Jing
- Composer: Zhao Jiping
- Country of origin: China
- Original language: Mandarin
- No. of episodes: 51

Production
- Executive producers: He Xiaoli; Wang Heng; Lü Hongqiang; Lin Feng; Lu Shuchao; Cai Sanqiang; Guo Ziqiang
- Producers: Zhang Ziyang; Gu Lingyang; Li Yuan; Chen Liang; Li Xiubao
- Production location: China
- Cinematography: Yuan Xiaoman
- Editors: Li Zimeng; Kang Zhenhai
- Running time: ≈45 minutes per episode
- Production companies: Shaanxi Broadcast and TV Network; Shaanxi TV; Shanghai Media Group; Fujian Media Group; Beijing Military Region Political Department Ally Television Arts Centre; Shaanxi Guofeng Pictures Investment; Beijing Changhe Lüzhou Cultural Development

Related
- The Qin Empire II: Alliance (2012); The Qin Empire III (2017); The Qin Empire IV (2019)

The Qin Empire (大秦帝国之裂变) is a 2009 Chinese historical television series based on Sun Haohui's novel of the same title. First shown on China Central Television, it follows the rise of the Qin state during the Warring States period under the leadership of Duke Xiao of Qin. It was produced in 2006 and first aired on television channels in China in December 2009. It was followed by three sequels: The Qin Empire II: Alliance (2012), The Qin Empire III (2017) and The Qin Empire IV (2019), which were also based on Sun Haohui's novels.

== Synopsis ==
The series is set in the mid-fourth century BC during the Warring States period of ancient China. The Qin state has been weakened by years of poverty and internal conflict. It is now in peril of being conquered by the other six major states. Duke Xiao, the new ruler of Qin, seeks to restore his state to its former glory during Duke Mu's time, and retake the Qin territories lost to the Wei state in earlier battles.

In his quest to recruit talents to assist him, Duke Xiao promises to share Qin with anyone – including foreigners – who could help him realise his grand ambitions. He attracts the attention of Wei Yang, a Legalist searching for opportunities to test his ideas. After discussing for three days and three nights on end, the two men develop a close relationship and work together over the next two decades to push forth a series of groundbreaking sociopolitical reforms in Qin. The reforms transform Qin into a powerful state and helped to lay the foundation for Qin's eventual unification of China under the Qin dynasty nearly 200 years later.

== Cast ==
- Hou Yong as Ying Quliang (Duke Xiao of Qin)
- Wang Zhifei as Wei Yang (Shang Yang)
- Gao Yuanyuan as Bai Xue
- Du Yulu as Gongshu Cuo
- Lü Zhong as the Duchess Dowager of Qin
- Sun Feihu as Gan Long
- Xu Huanshan as Ying Shixi (Duke Xian of Qin)
- You Yong as Pang Juan
- Lee Li-chun as King Hui of Wei
- Lu Yong as Ying Qian
- Qi Fang as Yingyu
- Yu Yang as Jing Jian
- Hou Xiangling as Che Ying
- Jiang Hualin as Heibo
- Lu Ying as Du Zhi
- Qiu Yongli as Gongsun Gu
- Liu Naiyi as Ying Si
  - Feng Pengfei as Ying Si (young)
- Guo Changhui as Zi'an
- Chen Zhihui as Hou Ying
- Wang Hui as Prince Ang of Wei
- Yuan Ran as Xuanqi
- Ren Wei as Wang Shi
- Zhao Yang as Meigu
- Jiao Changdao as Meng Che
- Ren Xihong as Xiqi Hu
- Li Zhuo as Bai Jin
- Sun Jiaolong as Jing Nan
- Wu Ma as Baili Yao
- Li Haige as Linghu
- Liu Bingfeng as Gan Cheng
- Liu Mu as Crown Prince Shen of Wei
- Lu Chaofan as Jin Bi
- Jiang Hua as Long Gu
- Zhao Dongbo as Shen Buhai
- Feng Zheng as Shanjia
- Xia Lu as Heya
- Mao Yue as Ying Ji (Chuli Ji)
- Xu Yuting as Bai Tuo
- Li Shide as Shen Dao
- Zhou Yuhua as Qin Guxi
- Wang Yingqi as Denglingzi
- Qian Weidong as Kuhuo
- Jin Ming as Zhao Kang
- Zhang Bingqi as Zhao Liang
- Ji Chen as King Wei of Qi
- Dong Qiming as Sun Bin
- Mei Shengxiang as Bian Que
- Unknown as Zhang Yi

== Music ==
- "A Great Wind Comes Forth and the Clouds Rise High" (大风起兮云飞扬) by Liao Changyong and Tan Jing
- "Grand Old Qin" (赳赳老秦) by the China Philharmonic Orchestra
- "Sowing Mutual Love" (相爱耕织) by Lei Jia
- "Magnificent and Unmatched" (风华绝代) by Tan Jing

== Awards ==
The series won the Flying Goddess Award and the Golden Eagle Prize for the Best TV Drama.

== International broadcasts ==
Country	Network	Airing dates
China	()	, 20 -, 20 ()
Taiwan	VL Max TV (緯來育樂台)	December 15, 2017 (Every Monday to Friday 20:00-22:00, December 15 21:00-22:00)
Thailand	PPTV HD	July 16, 2015 - November 12, 2015 (Every Thursday and Friday from 14.55 - 15.55)
Thailand	Channel 9 MCOT HD	May 25, 2018 - July 26, 2018 (ASIAN SERIES Every Monday to Friday from 13.35 - 15.00)
