= King Huiwen of Zhao =

King Huiwen of Zhao 趙惠文王

King of Zhao
- Reign: 298–266 BCE
- Predecessor: King Wuling
- Successor: King Xiaocheng
- Born: 310 BCE
- Died: 266 BCE (aged 45)
- Spouse: Queen Wei of Zhao
- Issue: King Xiaocheng of Zhao; Lord Changan; Queen of King Wucheng of Yan
Names
- Ancestral name: Yíng (嬴); Lineage name: Zhào (趙); Given name: Hé (何)
Posthumous name
- King Huiwen (惠文王) or King Wen (文王)
- House: Ying
- Dynasty: Zhao
- Father: King Wuling of Zhao
- Mother: Queen Hui of Zhao 趙惠后 (Wu Wa 吳娃)

King Huiwen of Zhao (Chinese: 趙惠文王) (born 310 BCE – died 266 BCE, r. 298–266 BCE), personal name Zhao He, was a king of the Zhao state. During his reign, the Zhao state reached its apogee, with the aid of famous administrators and generals alike such as Lin Xiangru, Lian Po, Zhao She and Li Mu. He was the first ruler of Zhao to style himself "king" without later reversing the decision, and also the last ruler during the Warring States period to declare himself king.

== Early life ==
King Huiwen was one of the younger sons of King Wuling; however, since King Wuling favoured King Huiwen's mother Wu Wa, he eventually made King Huiwen heir, while the eldest son Zhao Zhang was demoted to Lord Anyang. In 298 BCE, King Wuling abdicated his throne in favor of King Huiwen.

== Career ==
In 295 BCE, Lord Anyang revolted at Shaqiu. Government forces prevailed, however, and Lord Anyang fled to King Wuling's palace for safety. Generals Li Dui and Gongzi Cheng thus began besieging the palace. In due time, Lord Anyang was handed over and killed; however, the generals did not let up the siege and King Wuling eventually died of hunger.

King Huiwen is a central character in many of the stories told about Lin Xiangru. In 283 BCE, King Zhaoxiang of Qin extended an offer (which he had no intention of abiding by) to Zhao that would see Qin hand over fifteen cities in exchange for the sacred jade, Heshibi. Lin Xiangru's actions saved face for Zhao and humiliated the Qin state.

In 279 BCE, King Zhaoxiang of Qin invited King Huiwen to a meeting at Mianchi; once there, he again attempted to shame King Huiwen by ordering the latter to play the zither. Lin Xiangru's actions again caused the Qin to lose face and earned him great acclaim throughout China.

In 270 BCE, Qin invaded the Han state and threatened crucial Zhao interests in central China, especially with regards to the Shangdang region (present-day southern Shanxi). King Huiwen sent forces to intervene; under the leadership of Zhao She the Qin forces were defeated. This minor skirmish enhanced Zhao prestige, but was to foreshadow a greater Zhao-Qin rivalry that would end disastrously for the former at the Battle of Changping a decade later.

== Death ==
King Huiwen of Zhao died in 266 BCE and was succeeded by his son and heir, King Xiaocheng.
