= Chuli Ji =

Member of royal family of the State of Qin

Chuli Ji (Chinese:樗里疾, died 300 BC), also known as Chulizi (樗里子), born Ying Ji (嬴疾), was a member of royal family of the State of Qin who played a major role in wars of expansion of Qin.

== Biography ==
In 318 BC, Han, Zhao, and Wei jointly attacked Qin. Chuli Ji led an army that defeated the three states at Xiuyu, beheading over 80,000 enemy soldiers. He pursued the allied forces to Guanze and captured a Han general. This action shocked the six states east of Guanzhong, and Chuli Ji was later given the title of Right Guard.

In 314 BC, Chuli Ji attacked Quwo and Jiaoyi in Wei and occupied Jiaoyi. Chuli Ji exiled the Quwo people to Wei and incorporated Quwo into Qin territory. Chu and Wei then turned their attention to the Han army, defeating Han at Anmen and beheading over 80,000 enemy soldiers.

In 313 BC, Chuli Ji personally led an army in an attack on the state of Zhao, capturing the Zhao general Zhao Zhuang and occupying the Zhao territory of Linyi.

The following year, he supported Wei Zhang's invasion of Chu, using tactics to alienate Chu generals and prevent their cooperation. He then defeated the Chu army at Danyang, capturing over 70 generals, including Qu Gai, and beheading 80,000 people.

Then, Qin sent an army to occupy Hanzhong, covering over 600 li (approximately 1,000 km) of Chu territory, and established Hanzhong Commandery. Unwilling to accept defeat, King Huai of Chu mobilized the entire nation to launch a counterattack against Qin. Led by Chuli Ji, the Qin army decisively defeated the Chu forces at Lantian.

After Chu's defeat at the Battle of Danyang and Lantian, Han and Wei took advantage of the situation and attacked and occupied the Chu territory of Deng. King Huai of Chu withdrew his troops, sought peace, and ceded the two cities to Qin. In recognition of his military achievements in this battle, Chuli Ji was appointed Lord of Yan County and bestowed the title of Yan Jun.

In 311 BC, King Huiwen of Qin died, and King Wu of Qin ascended to the throne. King Wu deposed Zhang Yi and Wei Zhang and appointed Chuli Ji and Gan Mao as his left and right prime ministers. Through a series of wars of expansion, Chuli Ji, Gan Mao, and Sima Cuo led Qin to prosperity and expansion, laying the foundation for its later unification.

Once, Chuli Ji led a thousand chariots into the Zhou court. The Zhou emperor personally led his troops to a gracious welcome. The King of Chu, enraged by the emperor's respect for Chuli Ji, confronted him. You Teng explained on his behalf, pointing out that the Zhou emperor had been wary of Qin and Chuli Ji, viewing them as deceitful and untrustworthy. This pleased the King of Chu, who subsequently withheld the matter.

In 307 BC, King Wu of Qin died and King Zhaoxiang ascended to the throne. Chuli Ji became prime minister, and Gan Mao fled to Wei.

In 306 BC, Chuli Ji led an army to attack Pucheng in the State of Wey. The terrified defenders of Pucheng pleaded with Hu Yan to negotiate peace with Chuli Ji. Hu Yan pointed out that Wey still existed thanks to Pucheng's protection, and argued that attacking Pucheng would outweigh the benefits, persuading Chuli Ji. If Qin were to capture Pucheng, Wey would inevitably submit to the state of Wei, greatly contributing to the waning power of Wei. A strengthened Wei would undoubtedly pose a threat to Qin. Benefiting Wei at the expense of Qin would undoubtedly incur the displeasure of the King of Qin. After weighing the pros and cons, Chuli Ji adopted Hu Yan's advice and withdrew his forces from the siege of Pucheng. After Pucheng was liberated, Chuli Ji laid siege to Pishicheng, but was thwarted by Wei general Di Zhang, resulting in a major defeat and forced to flee.
