= Gaoping =

Gaoping 高平市 Kaoping
- County-level city
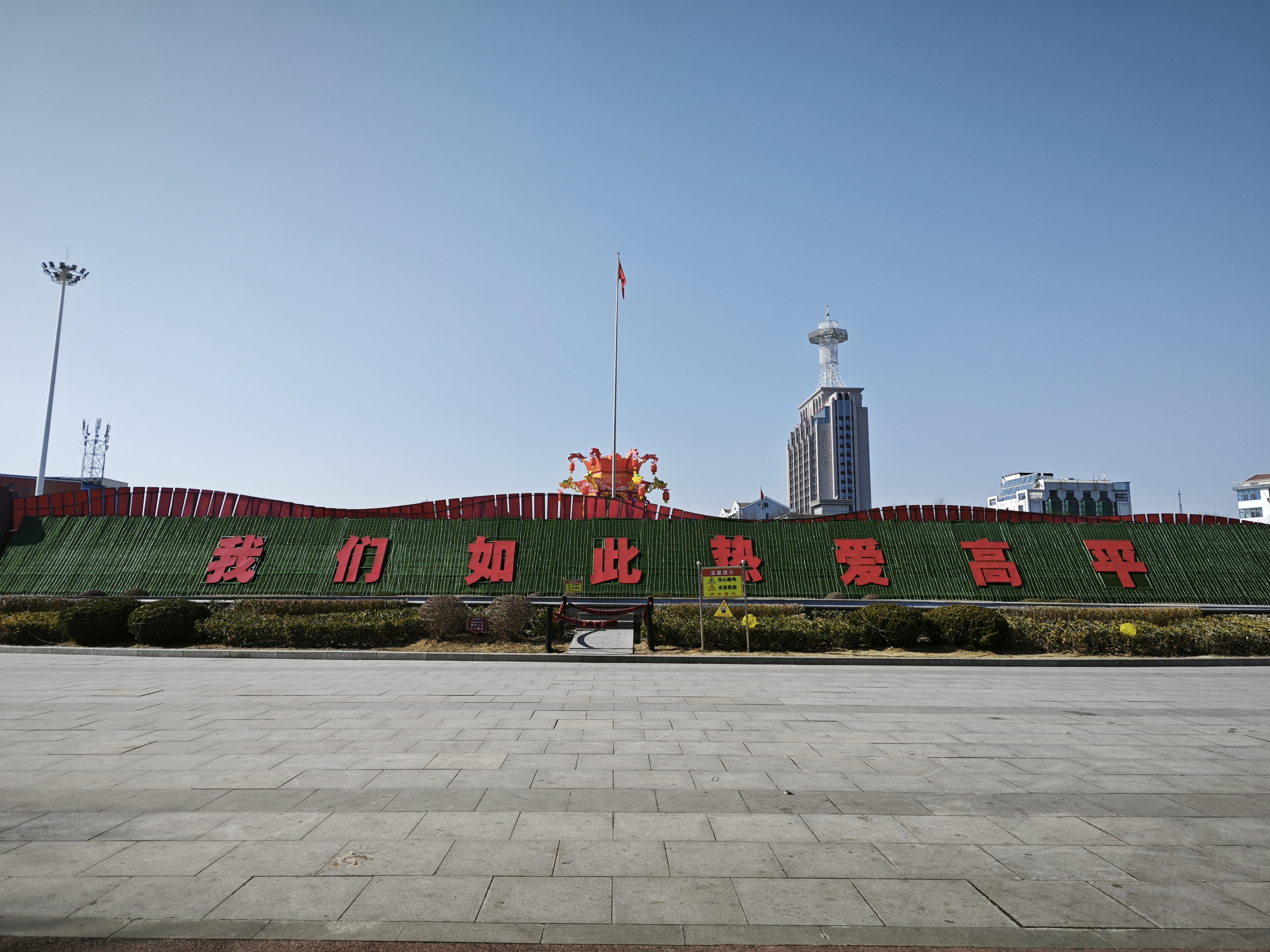

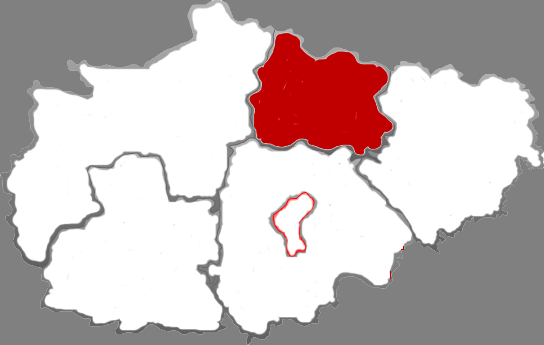

- Location in Shanxi
- Coordinates: 35°47′53″N 112°55′26″E
- Country: People's Republic of China
- Province: Shanxi
- Prefecture-level city: Jincheng

Area
  - County-level city: 946.0 km^{2} (365.3 sq mi)
  - Urban: 63.00 km^{2} (24.32 sq mi)

Population (2017)
  - County-level city: 494,000
  - Density: 522/km^{2} (1,350/sq mi)
  - Urban: 130,500
- Time zone: UTC+8 (China Standard)

Gaoping (Chinese: 高平; pinyin: Gāopíng) is a county-level city in the southeast of Shanxi Province, China, under the administration of the prefecture-level city of Jincheng. It has a history stretching back to the Warring States period (403–221 BCE). Part of the city was formerly known as Changping where a noted battle took place in 260 BCE between forces from the rival States of Qin and Zhao.

Gaoping is also famed as the birthplace of Lord Yan, a legendary figure who was an early leader (or series of leaders) among the ancient Han Chinese.

Gaoping (along with several other locations in China) was traditionally identified as Yan's hometown. Not until the late 20th and early 21st century was Gaoping widely accepted as Yan's birthplace by the global scholarly community.

The hilly area around Gaoping is known as the Sheep's Head Mountains (Chinese: 羊头山), and it is this area that preserves the most concrete evidences of Yan's habitation there. A local temple to a female river spirit has been identified as portraying Yan's daughter Nüwa (Chinese: 女娃) - not to be confused with the goddess Nüwa (Chinese: 女娲) - since the Ming dynasty. Ancient sources, such as the Guo Yu, record that Yan and his posterity flourished in the area around a river called the "Giang [Jiang] Water". The river is believed by scholars to be the Giang River of old is now called the Jiang River (Chinese: 绛河) or the Jiang Water (Chinese: 降水), and is located in Tunliu County, whence it flows east into the Zhang River.

== Climate ==
Climate data for Gaoping, elevation 837 m (2,746 ft), (1991–2020 normals, extremes 1981–2010)
Month	Jan	Feb	Mar	Apr	May	Jun	Jul	Aug	Sep	Oct	Nov	Dec	Year
Record high °C (°F)	16.1 (61.0)	23.0 (73.4)	28.7 (83.7)	36.6 (97.9)	37.3 (99.1)	38.3 (100.9)	37.7 (99.9)	36.1 (97.0)	36.0 (96.8)	31.2 (88.2)	25.4 (77.7)	18.7 (65.7)	38.3 (100.9)
Mean daily maximum °C (°F)	3.8 (38.8)	7.3 (45.1)	13.3 (55.9)	20.3 (68.5)	25.3 (77.5)	29.0 (84.2)	29.5 (85.1)	28.1 (82.6)	24.1 (75.4)	18.6 (65.5)	11.6 (52.9)	5.4 (41.7)	18.0 (64.4)
Daily mean °C (°F)	−3.7 (25.3)	−0.2 (31.6)	5.6 (42.1)	12.5 (54.5)	18.0 (64.4)	22.0 (71.6)	23.6 (74.5)	22.1 (71.8)	17.3 (63.1)	11.2 (52.2)	4.2 (39.6)	−2.0 (28.4)	10.9 (51.6)
Mean daily minimum °C (°F)	−9.1 (15.6)	−5.6 (21.9)	−0.4 (31.3)	5.8 (42.4)	11.2 (52.2)	15.8 (60.4)	19.0 (66.2)	17.8 (64.0)	12.4 (54.3)	5.7 (42.3)	−1.2 (29.8)	−7.1 (19.2)	5.4 (41.6)
Record low °C (°F)	−22.3 (−8.1)	−21.8 (−7.2)	−14.5 (5.9)	−5.0 (23.0)	−1.3 (29.7)	6.7 (44.1)	11.2 (52.2)	9.2 (48.6)	0.5 (32.9)	−7.5 (18.5)	−18.4 (−1.1)	−22.5 (−8.5)	−22.5 (−8.5)
Average precipitation mm (inches)	7.1 (0.28)	12.2 (0.48)	13.4 (0.53)	34.8 (1.37)	48.5 (1.91)	72.3 (2.85)	143.7 (5.66)	107.9 (4.25)	70.9 (2.79)	34.1 (1.34)	18.2 (0.72)	5.9 (0.23)	569 (22.41)
Average precipitation days (≥ 0.1 mm)	3.9	4.3	4.8	5.8	7.8	9.9	13.0	12.0	9.5	7.0	5.1	3.4	86.5
Average snowy days	5.0	5.0	3.0	0.6	0	0	0	0	0	0.1	2.1	4.3	20.1
Average relative humidity (%)	59	60	57	57	59	64	78	81	77	71	66	60	66
Mean monthly sunshine hours	164.1	166.8	197.9	223.6	244.4	216.6	197.6	191.4	170.2	178.9	169.6	170.5	2,291.6
Percentage possible sunshine	53	54	53	57	56	50	45	46	46	52	56	57	52
Source: China Meteorological Administration
