= Battle of Changping =

Battle where the Qin state decisively defeated the Zhao state

Coordinates: 35°47′53″N 112°55′26″E

- Part of the Warring States period
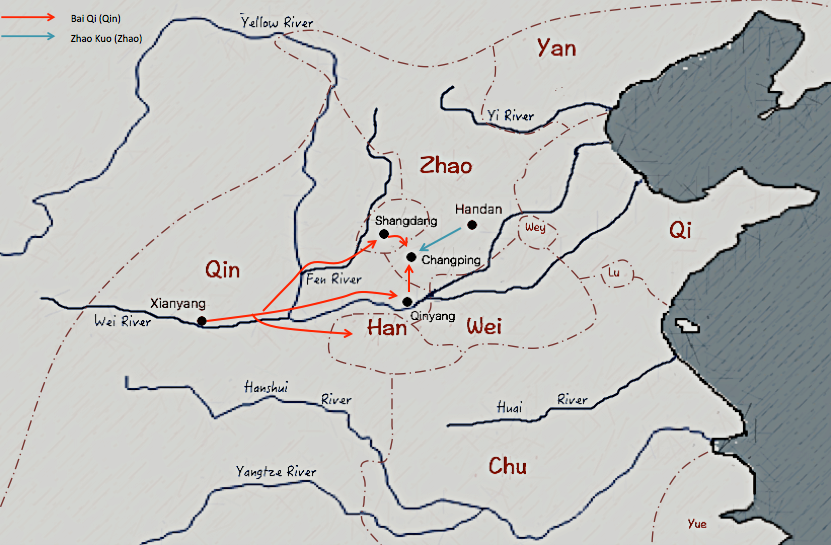
- Battle of Changping between Qin and Zhao
Date	April 262 BC – July 260 BC
Location	Northwest of Gaoping, Shanxi
Result	Qin victory: Qin strategic supremacy consolidated; Severe weakening of Zhao military might; Siege of Handan

Belligerents
State of Zhao	State of Qin

Commanders and leaders
Lian Po; Zhao Kuo †; Feng Ting †	Wang He; Bai Qi; Neishi Teng

Strength
450,000	550,000

Casualties and losses
Sima Qian almost 450,000 dead large portion executed after capture; 240 of the youngest soldiers spared	Sima Qian c. 250,000 dead

The Battle of Changping (長平之戰) was a military campaign during the Warring States period of China that was fought between the two strongest military powers of the central plains, the State of Qin and the State of Zhao (northwest of present-day Gaoping). After a bitter two-year stalemate stretching 262 to 260 BC, the battle ended in a decisive victory for Qin forces. A vast majority of Zhao captives were ruthlessly executed, an unrecoverable loss of manpower and strategic reserve that permanently crippled the State of Zhao.

It is known as the greatest and longest battle of human antiquity. Infamous for being one of the deadliest battles in human history, several hundred thousand soldiers were buried alive in the aftermath. The main historical records for the events of this period are sourced from the Records of the Grand Historian, written more than a century later, which estimated roughly 450,000 dead on the Zhao side and 250,000 dead on the Qin side. Emperor Xuanzong of Tang (685–762) later built a temple over a collection of some of the human remains, and scattered bones and mass graves continue to be discovered on the site today.

== Prelude ==
In 265 BC, Qin attacked the State of Han and captured Qinyang, which effectively cut off Han's Shangdang Commandery (in modern-day Changzhi, Shanxi province) from its southern heartland (in modern western Henan), making Shangdang an isolated northern exclave. Within the following years, the Qin army further isolated Shangdang from Han by capturing the crucial mountain passes and fortresses across the Taihang Mountains, and Shangdang was poised to fall.

Rather than seeing Shangdang being taken by Qin, Shangdang's governing commander, Feng Ting, decided to offer the region to Zhao. Shangdang was a productive and strategically important region just west of Zhao's capital Handan, and its capture would allow Qin easy incursions east into Zhao heartland, so King Xiaocheng of Zhao (趙孝成王) accepted and dispatched senior general Lian Po to lead an army and secure the region from the encroaching Qin.

== Battle ==
=== Early skirmishes ===
In 262 BC, the Qin army, led by Wang He, invaded Shangdang, and Feng Ting had to evacuate the commandery. The Zhao army also mobilized, and after arriving at the front line, Lian Po set up three defensive lines pivoted south of Changping Pass (at the border between present-day Gaoping and Zhangzi County).

In April, the Zhao army first encountered the Qin army west of Gaoping Pass (at the border between present-day Gaoping and Qinshui County, Shanxi) on Lian Po's first defensive line, and suffered several defeats during initial confrontations with the Qin vanguards. The Qin army killed the Zhao commander in Gaoping and quickly capitalized on the momentum of these successes, capturing Gaoping Pass as well as three other Zhao strongholds nearby, and the first defensive line collapsed. Having assessed the enemy's strength, Lian Po concluded the only way to counter the Qin offensive was to avoid field battles and hold the second defensive line along the Dan River (丹水, the largest tributary of Qin River, which traverses the present-day Gaoping city). He started focusing on further reinforcing positions on the east bank of Dan River valley using fortified ramparts built along the mountain foothills, hoping to exhaust the Qin army, as Changping was much farther away from Qin territory than Zhao and keeping the army supplied would be much more taxing to the Qin due to the more rugged and winding mountain routes in the west.

The Qin army did attempt crossing the Dan River and even once managed to breach Lian Po's second defensive line, but they did not have enough strength to exploit it and were beaten back. By July, the two sides were forced into a bitter stalemate across the river, which lasted the next two years. Both sides massively reinforced their positions, with total combatants numbering around a million in early 260 BC.

=== Change of Zhao strategy ===
While Lian Po's strategy of holding and wearing out the Qin army was working, problems started to arise back home. The Qin side were frustrated and desperate to break the stalemate, so they sent spies into Zhao and Han to spread rumors that Lian Po was too senile and cowardly to fight. King Xiaocheng of Zhao was already dissatisfied with Po's strategy of dragging out the war for so long, which was also very logistically taxing for Zhao, so he decided to replace Lian Po with Zhao Kuo, the overconfident yet untested son of the famous late general Zhao She.

According to Shiji, the young Zhao Kuo excelled in reciting military philosophies so much that his father often got flabbergasted in debates. However, on his deathbed Zhao She had told his wife to never let his son command an army, because Kuo regarded wars as easy games and treated risks with hubris rather than caution, despite having never experienced any actual battles. When Zhao Kuo was appointed general, Lady Zhao and minister Lin Xiangru tried to persuade King Xiaocheng to rescind that appointment, but their appeal failed. Lady Zhao however did manage to extract a promise from the king that the Zhao clan would not be punished if Zhao Kuo loses the war.

Upon hearing that the Zhao king fell for the rumor, the Qin secretly replaced Wang He with the renowned general Bai Qi, who was infamous for his brutal efficiency in annihilation battles. The appointment of Bai Qi was highly classified in order to not alarm the Zhao army, and anyone who leaked the news would be punished by death.

=== Zhao defeated ===
In July 260 BC, Zhao Kuo arrived at Changping and took over command of the Zhao army. He discarded all previous defensive strategies made by his predecessor, and instead decided to take his main force north to quickly cross the Dan River and attack the left flank of the Qin army stationed along the west bank of the river's upper reaches, hoping a decisive offense would be enough to break the Qin army. In doing so, he left most of the provisions stored at the old main camp further south along the river, which was now relatively undermanned and could not secure the elongated supply line stretched along in front of the Qin army across the river.

Unknown to Zhao Kuo, Bai Qi had anticipated his plan and responded with a maneuver that was later done by Hannibal Barca against the Romans decades later at the Battle of Cannae. Bai Qi had deliberately reduced the strength of his left flank stationed along the river, and had a line of hill fortifications further west of the river reinforced instead. When Zhao Kuo crossed the river and attacked, the Qin left flank quickly abandoned their riverside positions and withdrew back west toward the hills, drawing Zhao Kuo to chase after them. However, a Qin detachment of 25,000 men had then traversed north through the Taiyue Mountains to perform a wide left encirclement behind Zhao's third defensive line stapled around the Changping Pass, cutting off Zhao supply lines from the north. At the same time, another detachment of 5,000 light cavalry with bows and crossbows advanced on the right and crossed the Dan River to cut off communications between Zhao Kuo's new camp and their southern main depot, splitting the Zhao army into two, and Bai Qi's main force immediately followed in to secure vantage positions and choke off the Dan River valley exits. These detachments eventually completed a triangular encirclement that trapped Zhao Kuo's forces inside the river valley.

Zhao Kuo soon found his offensive against the enemy left flank halted by the Qin hill fortifications, unable to make any progress. He then realized that his rear were being ambushed by the Qin cavalry and provisions were quickly running low, and was forced to abandon his attacks and pull back across the river. The Qin army then counterattacked and pursued, inflicting heavy casualties upon Zhao Kuo's retreating army. After being blocked and unable to reach the friendly forces in the south, the Zhao Kuo's army dug in on a hill and had to await relief.

However, since 295 BC, Zhao foreign policy had been dominated by opportunism, and had frequently shifted between hezong (合縱) (anti-Qin alliances) and lianheng (連橫) (pro-Qin alliances), depleting its diplomatic goodwill with other states. Therefore, as the battles in Changping unfolded, Zhao was unable to secure any help from either the State of Chu or the State of Qi. King Zhaoxiang of Qin used this opportunity to mobilize additional forces against Zhao from Henei (in modern-day Henan province), by bestowing one grade of noble rank on the population as merits and ordered a nationwide mobilization conscripting every able-bodied man over the age of 15, with the king himself personally overseeing the reserves to the Changping frontline in order to further bolster the encirclement.

With the enemy firmly trapped, Bai Qi started repeatedly launching attacks to further wear out the Zhao army and deny them any chance of escape. Zhao Kuo's improvised hill positions were besieged non-stop for 46 days, and by September, with winter nearing, his unsupplied army's struggle for survival grew more desperate, with the starving Zhao soldiers slaughtering all the horses and allegedly even murdering and feeding on each other. The fighting was also so fierce that half of the Qin soldiers were killed in combat, but the exhausted and demoralized Zhao army was ultimately unsuccessful in breaking out. Zhao Kuo was eventually killed by Qin archers and crossbowmen when leading his best troops in a final attempt to breach the encirclement. With their commander dead, the remaining Zhao army gave up and surrendered.

== Aftermath ==
Bai Qi wanted to take advantage of the victory and quickly lay siege to Handan, but guarding and feeding the large number of prisoners of war would be a huge burden, and releasing them was out of the question because the newly subdued local population was still hostile to Qin rule and these Zhao captives would likely get reconscripted or participate in revolts. As a one-off solution, Bai Qi ordered the captured Zhao soldiers all to be executed, presumably by being buried alive; only 240 of the youngest soldiers were spared and released back to Zhao to spread terror. Han dynasty historian Sima Qian stated in his chronicle (written about 150 years later) that over 450,000 Zhao soldiers were killed during and after the battle.

However, King Zhaoxiang wanted to delay the offensive so the troopers could rest, turning down Bai Qi's request to lay siege upon Handan. In frustration, Bai Qi resigned and refused to lead the army again when the king asked him the following year, citing that the window of opportunity had long passed. King Zhaoxiang was angered by Bai Qi's defiance and ordered his death by forced suicide. The Qin army then carried the war into Zhao under other Qin generals, but were met with heavy resistance. Lord Pingyuan of Zhao also successfully procured aid from the states of Chu and Wei, leading to a devastating Qin defeat at the Battle of Handan, which halted the Qin campaigns of expansion for almost three decades.

Long-term, the Battle of Changping had profound consequences. Prior to the campaign, Zhao had been one of the most militarily powerful states of the Warring States and arguably the only one that could resist Qin's expansion. Instead, it never recovered from the loss of manpower at Changping. Meanwhile, three years of war had financially and domestically exhausted Qin as well, but within a decade Qin recovered to its full strength and gained complete strategic dominance over the other states. Forty years later in 221 BC, Qin would conquer all other states under King Zhaoxiang's great-grandson King Zheng, and unifying all of China under a centralized dynasty for the first time in the country's history.

== In popular culture ==
The defeat of Zhao Kuo, who doomed his entire army, led to the Chinese idiom "talking wars on paper" (Chinese: 纸上谈兵), referring to someone who is great at theoretical thinking but performs poorly in practice.

The 2004 Chinese television series Changping of the War is based on the battle.

The battle also features as background to the events taking place in the manga Kingdom with the events having a direct and indirect impact on the character development of several major characters on many sides, most notably Wan Ji of Zhao, who led an army of other survivors and families of those killed in bloody and gory revenge upon Qin citizens. Wang He, the other general, was divided into two different generals, Wang Qi, and Wang He, the former fought on Changping.

Changping is also a major plot point in The Legend of Haolan. The catastrophe and chaos in the state of Zhao causes the main characters to flee to Qin.

== Sources ==
- Sima Qian. Records of the Grand Historian.
