= Zhao She =

3rd century BC Chinese Zhao state bureaucrat and general

Zhao She 趙奢
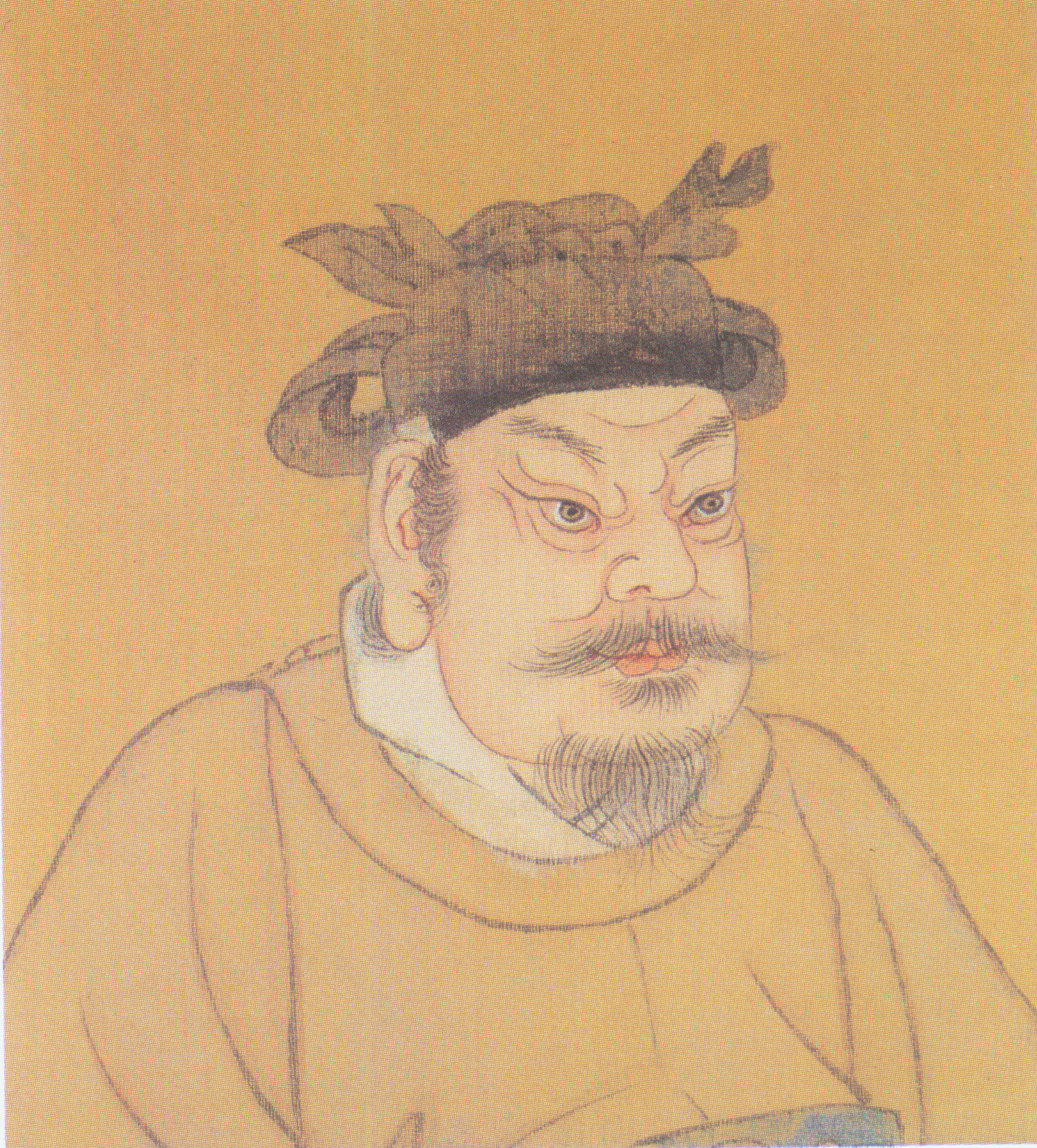
- Imagined portrait of Zhao She from the Qing dynasty
- Issue: Zhao Kuo
- Dynasty: Zhao

Zhao She (fl. 3rd century BC; Chinese: 趙奢) was a Chinese bureaucrat and general for the state of Zhao during the Warring States period.

== Biography ==
Zhao She's origins and early life were unknown, other than he was initially employed as a land tax collector in the state of Zhao. Although it was not a high or powerful position, Zhao She carried out his duties according to the law.

At this time there was a very powerful aristocrat by the name of Zhao Sheng, who refused to pay any land tax. In order to avoid punishing Zhao Sheng personally, Zhao She arrested and killed the nine administrators who kept accounts for Zhao Sheng's family. Zhao Sheng became very angry and wanted to kill Zhao She.

However, Zhao She scolded Zhao Sheng for not upholding the law of the state. Zhao She also reminded Zhao Sheng that as an aristocrat, he should be an example in abiding by the law and not infringing on it lest the state would perish. Zhao Sheng realised that he was wrong and he not only apologised to Zhao She, but also recommended him to the ruler for promotion. Zhao She subsequently was promoted as the land tax collector of the whole state.

In 271 BCE the State of Qin sent a large army to attack Han, but would have to attack the Zhao territory in the way. The Zhao army was no match for the Qin, who captured a large part of the Zhao territory. The Qin forces were approaching Yuyu (閼與, in present-day Heshun county, Shanxi province), which was very far from the Zhao capital of Handan. At that time the commander-in-chief of the Zhao forces, Lian Po recommended abandoning Yuyu as it was too far away to reinforce. Also, the road to Yuyu was narrow and winding. Zhao She told the ruler and the commander-in-chief that when two armies were fighting in a narrow and winding road it was like two rats fighting in a little hold with not much room to manoeuvre. The braver and stronger one would win.

King Huiwen of Zhao then appointed Zhao She to lead a reinforcing army to rescue Yuyu. Zhao She equipped his troops with light armour for mobility and reached the Qin forces' rear. The Qin forces, in fear of being trapped, lifted the siege and turn its full strength against the approaching Zhao forces. Zhao She hid most of his troops on a mountain, which he estimated the Qin troops would approach by dusk. Sure enough, the Qin forces approached, and Zhao She ambushed them in the dark. With determination and bravery, Zhao She defeated the Qin forces. King Huiwen rewarded Zhao She by making him the administrator of a district called Mafu (馬服; in present-day north of Handan city in Hebei province).

Unfortunately for the state of Zhao, Zhao She died just years after this victory. He was succeeded by his son Zhao Kuo, who was the commander of the catastrophic Battle of Changping.

Eventually in 228 BC, the state of Zhao was subjugated by the State of Qin.

The offspring of Zhao She adopted "Ma" (馬), the first character of the district "Mafu", as their surname.

== In popular culture ==
In the manga and anime Kingdom, he was a Great General of Zhao known as "Chou Sha" and he was one of the original "Three Great Heavens of Zhao", alongside "Ren Pa" and "Rin Shou Jo".
