= Fan Ju =

Fan Ju (Chinese: 范雎; pinyin: Fàn Jū; Wade–Giles: Fan Chü), courtesy name Shu, was born in Ruicheng County (in present-day Shanxi Province). He was a Warring States-era politician and military strategist from the State of Wei, who later served as Chancellor of Qin.
