= Lin Xiangru =

Chinese chancellor

Lin Xiangru (Chinese: 藺相如; pinyin: Lìn Xiāngrú) (died c.July 260 BCE) was a politician and general of the Warring States period, who served the state of Zhao. He figures prominently in two stories of the period, namely the episode and the namesake chengyu of "Returning the Jade to Zhao" (完璧歸趙), as well as the story and the namesake chengyu of "Carrying Thorned Grass and Pleading Guilt" (負荊請罪).

== Background ==
Lin Xiangru was born sometime in the reign of King Wuling of Zhao in present-day Mengmen town, Liulin County, Shanxi. Due to his intellect and superior skills, he rose quickly through the ranks of the Zhao bureaucracy.

== Returning the Jade to Zhao ==
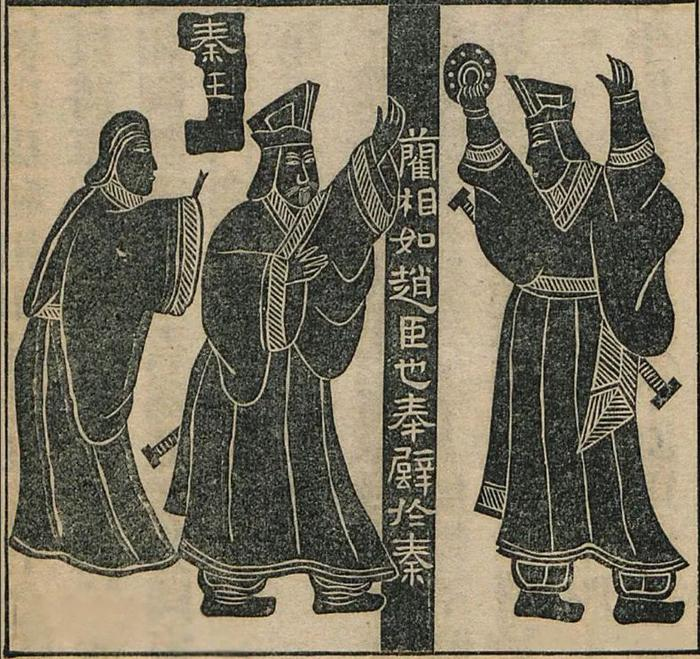
Relief tracing of Lin Xiangru with the Heshibi and King of Qin on Wu Family Shrines' stone-relief, from Jinshisuo (金石索).

Emissaries from the King of Qin came over to the Zhao court one day, offering to exchange fifteen cities for the sacred Heshibi jade disk. At this stage of the Warring States period, Qin was the most powerful state, making it difficult to decline. On the other hand, the Kings of Qin had historically been untrustworthy, and King Huiwen of Zhao did not trust the King of Qin to keep his side of the bargain. Lin Xiangru volunteered to go to the Qin court with the He Shi Bi, promising to trade the jade for the cities if the King of Qin kept his word, and to return the jade safely if he did not.

At the Qin court, the King of Qin passed the He Shi Bi among his ministers and concubines, making no mention of the promised 15 cities. Lin concluded that the King of Qin was not intending to keep his word. He tricked the King of Qin by claiming that there was a tiny flaw in the jade, and when the King of Qin returned the jade to him so that he could point out the flaw, Lin threatened to smash both the jade and his head (i.e. commit suicide) against a pillar if the King of Qin tried to take it back by force. He demanded the King of Qin fast for three days and receive him with proper ceremonies before surrendering the jade. The Qin king, unwilling to see the jade ruined, agreed. That night, still not trusting the King of Qin, Lin ordered his henchman to take the jade back to Zhao in secret; he himself would stay in Qin and face the King. Three days later, the King of Qin was furious that the jade had been returned to Zhao. However, unwilling to execute a Zhao diplomat, he could do nothing but let Lin go.

The incident made Lin famous throughout the Warring States as the man who had shamed the Qin king. His status rose and soon he was chief minister of Zhao.

== Carrying Thorned Grass and Pleading Guilt ==
Many people were jealous of Lin's meteoric rise, most notably the old general Lian Po, one of the most experienced commanders during that time. Lian Po was so jealous that he swore enmity between the two of them. When Lin had caught wind of this, he decided that the best way to deal with the problem was to not confront Lian at all. In one incident, Lian's and Lin's carriage met on a narrow road. Lin, as the higher-ranking minister, normally had right of passage; however, he turned and backed out of the street in order to let Lian pass.

Many saw it as a sign of weakness, not least Lian Po himself, who reckoned that Lin, an academic, was too scared to fight such a warrior as he. Lin's courtiers, too, grew dissatisfied by the subservient way Lin was behaving, and many left. But when Lin's chief courtier demanded to know why he was behaving in such a manner, Lin Xiangru replied: "The feud between me and Lian Po is a personal one; but I am in charge of the nation's government, and he the nation's security: I cannot let my personal life ruin that of the kingdom!"

When Lian Po finally heard of this, all his jealousy turned into shame. Deciding to apologize to Lin, he strapped brambles to his bare back and walked from his house to that of Lin Xiangru's, begging for his forgiveness. Lin Xiangru forgave him, and from then on, they became good friends. The alliance between chief minister and general kept Zhao peaceful for years.

== Subsequent events ==
When Lian Po was on the verge of being replaced as overall commander in the Battle of Changping by the much younger and much more inexperienced Zhao Kuo, Lin Xiangru, then already gravely ill, begged King Xiaocheng of Zhao to reconsider the decision. However, his advice was not heeded, and disaster followed. Lin Xiangru died probably around Zhao's final defeat at the Battle of Changping.

== Legacy ==
- Sima Xiangru, a poet during the western Han dynasty, named himself after Lin Xiangru as a result of having fostered great admiration for the latter during his studies.

== Popular culture ==
Lin Xiangru is one of the 32 historical figures who appear as special characters in the video game Romance of the Three Kingdoms XI by Koei.

Lin Xiangru also appears in the manga Kingdom as one of the original "Three Great Heavens of Zhao" alongside Lian Po (Ren Pa) and Zhao She (Chou Sha) under his Japanese name "Rin Shou Jo", fostering a friendly rivalry with the former. He was regarded as a prodigy for warfare but died early in his career, and most of his retainers went down performing suicide charges, stricken by grief, except for two who stayed at his deathbed. Many years later, the remaining two joined their master after being killed.

Lin Xiangru is portrayed by Tan Yang in the last episode of The Legend of Mi Yue (2015) as a guest appearance, depicting the "Returning the Jade to Zhao" incident.
