= Zhao Kuo =

General of the State of Zhao in Warring States period

Zhao Kuo (趙括; died 260 BCE) was a general of the state of Zhao during the Warring States period in ancient China. He lost the epic Battle of Changping between the states of Zhao and Qin.

== Biography ==
Zhao Kuo was the son of the famous general Zhao She.

Zhao Kuo was sent on the orders of King Xiaocheng of Zhao to the battlefield to replace the previous general, the famous commander Lian Po. The king, under the influence of several of his courtiers (many of whom were believed to be bribed by Qin emissaries), and heedless of the advice given by his most important minister, Lin Xiangru, was dissatisfied by Lian's defensive strategy: while Lian Po was in command, he set up camp, built forts, and stayed in them, not responding to any of the enemy's taunts or lures designed to get his army out onto the field. This dragged on for several years, and the king felt that the time for decisive action had come.

According to Records of the Grand Historian, as soon as Zhao Kuo's mother heard that he was going off to the front, she immediately went to the king and told him this tale: one day, when the late Zhao She and Zhao Kuo were talking military tactics and playing Chinese chess, she was amazed to see the son beating the more experienced father every single time. However, Zhao She was not impressed. When asked why, Zhao She said, "This boy treats a battle like a game of chess; his men like mere pawns that can be sacrificed at will. All his tactics are based on the books he read, so he has no idea what real warfare is like! (This developed into the Chinese idiom 紙上談兵 or engaging in "paper warfare".) He can never command an army." However, the legend is largely taken with a grain of salt by historians, who rebut its logic and credibility. Many scholars consider the source to serve as propaganda for the State of Qin.

As stated by Records of the Grand Historian, her tale was ignored by the king. On the other hand, when Qin general Bai Qi became aware of the replacement, he laughed and told his men that the battle was won. When the Qin king heard of it, he immediately went to the nearby provinces, bestowed one noble rank on all of the citizenry there, ordered every single man over the age of 15 to go and assist the Qin cause, and formed an army as strong as 650,000 men.

=== Battle of Changping ===
Zhao Kuo now controlled the largest force that Zhao had ever mustered, numbering at about 450,000 men, or most of the male population of the state of Zhao. He decided to attack the Qin forts since he was confident of his strength in numbers. The Battle of Changping is ranked among the largest and most lethal military operations in history since the combined troops numbered at 1.1 million. The battle reflects total war between the states, with both countries using all of their human and economic resources.

Many scholars believe that Zhao Kuo, though inexperienced, was a talented general and had the potential to become one of the best if he had enough time to develop his practical skills. However, he had to misfortune to face Bai Qi in his first battle. Bai Qi was one of the most talented generals in Chinese history, who was undefeated on the battlefield and renowned for his tactical skills with cavalry and accurate assessment of the best time to attack. Under pressure from the King of Zhao to win the war through a pitched battle, Zhao Kuo had no choice but to strike over open ground because of the shortage of supplies since most of the young men of Zhao had been fighting in Changping for over two years. In addition, many of his elite troops were mounted archers and light cavalry who were inept at defending.

Zhao Kuo decided to break the stalemate by attacking first. Initially, the offensive went well; many Qin forts fell, and for a moment it seemed as if the Qin army would admit defeat. Seeing the retreat of the enemy, Zhao Kuo became haughty and complacent without knowing that the King of Qin had replaced the former general with Bai Qi.

Unknown to the Zhao troops, Bai Qi had purposely feigned retreat to encircle and annihilate the entire Zhao force. Bai Qi had decided that to defeat the large Zhao army, the best method would be to trap them and slowly starve them to death. Bai Qi's timing was perfect. Now with the Zhao army deep inside Bai Qi's trap, Bai Qi sent his elite cavalry brigades to attack the Zhao army's rear and occupied the lightly-defended Zhao fortresses back in Changping. Simultaneously, he also sent his troops to launch a pincer attack from both flanks. Furthermore, Bai Qi demanded his cavalry strike through the gap between Zhao Kuo's aggressive cavalry and huge infantry divisions, dividing his army in half. Zhao Kuo was trapped, with most of his force in a tiny pocket, and was forced to entrench his army and wait for aid.

With its food and water supplies cut off by the Qin army, Zhao Kuo's force slowly began to thirst and starve. The situation only deteriorated when the army could not find water even after it dug as deep as a few zhang. Zhao Kuo led numerous counterstrikes, only to be repelled by the Qin army, which was famous for its invincible archers and crossbowmen's ability to "rain bolts and arrows."

Without any reinforcement from Zhao and running low of water and food after 40 days, a desperate Zhao Kuo finally ordered his army to attempt to breakout. Heavily outnumbered and exhausted, the Zhao soldiers were cut down like crops by the Qin troops. Zhao Kuo himself was killed during the breakout by the Qin archers and crossbowmen. The rest of his troops surrendered after Zhao Kuo's death, and the 450,000 strong army was annihilated.

Based on Records of the Grand Historian, after the defeat of Zhao Kuo's army, Bai Qi ordered the execution of some 400,000 Zhao soldiers, presumably by burying them alive. However, the number is believed by many scholars as inaccurate since that would account for roughly 89% of the total Zhao army after it had fought heavy skirmishes for more than 40 days.

== See also ==
- Twenty-Four Histories
