= King Xiaocheng of Zhao =

King Xiaocheng of Zhao 趙孝成王
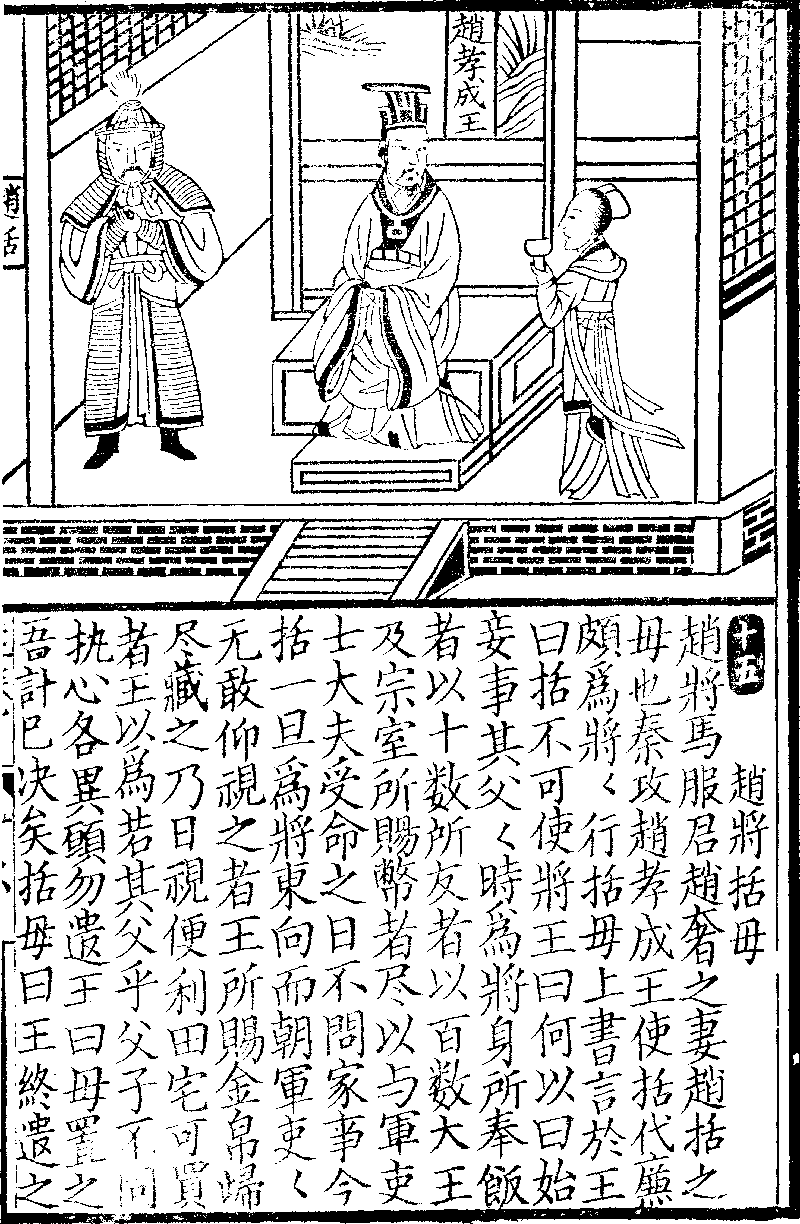

King of Zhao
- Reign: 265–245 BCE
- Predecessor: King Huiwen
- Successor: King Daoxiang
- Born: unknown
- Died: 245 BCE
- Spouse: unknown
- Issue: Crown Prince; Marquess Chunping; King Daoxiang of Zhao
Names
- Ancestral clan: Yíng (嬴); Branch lineage: Zhào (趙); Given name: Dān (丹)
Posthumous name
- King Xiaocheng (孝成王)
- House: Ying
- Dynasty: Zhao
- Father: King Huiwen of Zhao

King Xiaocheng of Zhao (Chinese: 趙孝成王; r. 265 BCE – 245 BCE), personal name Zhao Dan, was a king of the Zhao state. His reign saw the decline of Zhao military power owing to the catastrophic defeat by the Qin state at the Battle of Changping.

King Xiaocheng ascended to the throne in the midst of a military stalemate between the Qin and the Zhao over the status of Shangdang, which the Han state had ceded to Zhao during the reign of King Huiwen. The commander in charge of Zhao forces, Lian Po, opted for a defensive strategy of fort construction. Perhaps due to Qin accusations of Lian Po's cowardice, King Xiaocheng decided in 260 BCE to replace him with Zhao Kuo, regardless of objections from the leading politician Lin Xiangru. Zhao Kuo's offensive strategy played right into the hands of Qin general Bai Qi, and ultimately cost Zhao the battle and, with it, Zhao's military pre-eminence.

King Xiaocheng died in 245 BCE and was succeeded by his son and heir, King Daoxiang.

== Notes and references ==
- Zhao Guo Shi Gao (Draft History of the Zhao State), Shen Changyun, Zhonghua Book Company, China.
