= Lian Po =

Chinese general (d. 229 BCE)

Lord Xinping Lian Po
- 廉頗
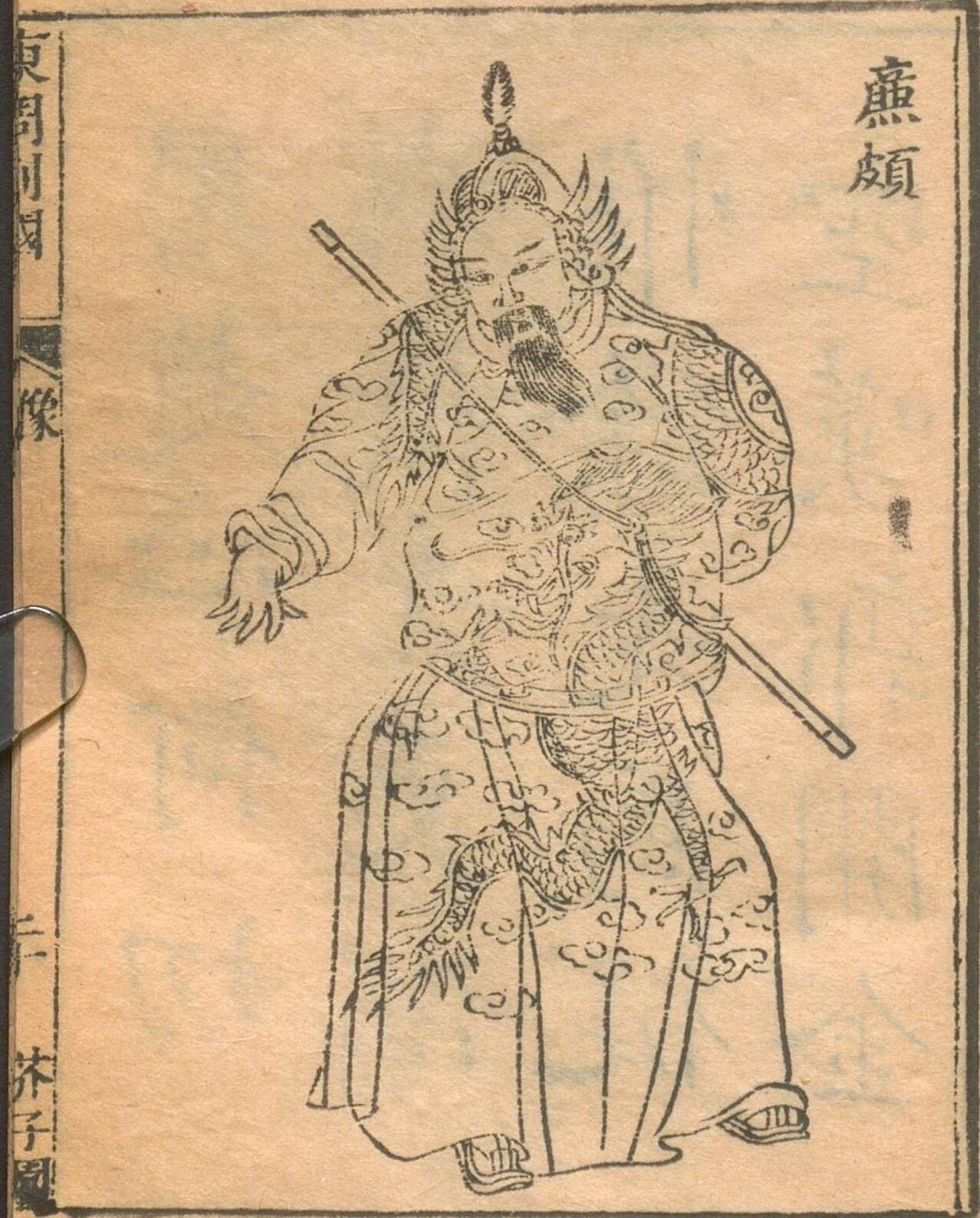
- Born: c. 327 BC; Kuxing, Zhao (present-day Hebei)
- Died: 243 BC (aged 84); Shouchun, Chu (present-day Anhui)
- Military career
- Allegiance: Zhao
- Rank: General

Lian Po
- Traditional Chinese: 廉頗
- Simplified Chinese: 廉颇
Transcriptions
Standard Mandarin
- Hanyu Pinyin: Lían Pō
- Wade–Giles: Lien P'o

Lian Po (Chinese: 廉頗; c. 327 – 243 BC), courtesy name Hongye (洪野), was a prominent general of the Zhao state in the Warring States period of Chinese history. He was regarded by the Thousand Character Classic as one of the Four Greatest Generals of the Warring States period, along with Bai Qi, Wang Jian and Li Mu. Since his early years as a general, he won multiple battles, which earned him fame and a successful military career in his home state.

== Life ==
In Lian Po's early years, he had victories in the wars against Qi and Wei. Lin Xiangru, a minister of Zhao, was disliked by Lian Po because of his rapid rise to power and genius. But Lin Xiangru, in several famous incidents, took great steps to avoid Lian Po; in one case he even turned from Lian Po's carriage rather than block the great general's route. Lian Po initially interpreted this as weakness, but when he learned that Lin gave way because he did not wish to allow their personal feud to jeopardize the nation's security, Lian Po became embarrassed. He went to Lin Xiangru's house carrying sharp brambles on his shoulder to ask Lin Xiangru to forgive him. Afterward, they became good friends. The chengyu of "Carrying Thorned Grass and Pleading Guilt" (負荊請罪), meaning "to offer someone a humble apology, requesting punishment and forgiveness", is derived from this story.

During the Battle of Changping, Lian Po commanded the Zhao forces against the Qin army under Wang He. Deciding not to risk his forces in open battle, Lian Po instead built a series of forts along the Changping area, successfully stalemating the invaders. However, King Xiaocheng of Zhao (趙孝成王), under the influence of many courtiers (most of whom were bribed heavily by Qin spies), became dissatisfied with Lian Po's strategy, and decided to replace him with Zhao Kuo (趙括). Zhao Kuo was the son of another famous Zhao general, Zhao She. Upon being appointed, Zhao Kuo discarded Lian Po's cautious, defensive strategy and recklessly attacked with full strength. Meanwhile, the Qin replaced Wang He with the famed General Bai Qi on hearing the news of Zhao's command change. The resulting battle was a disaster for the Zhao. Zhao Kuo was killed and his army utterly destroyed after entering a trap set by Bai Qi; 400,000 Zhao soldiers were executed under the Qin commander's orders.

After the Battle of Changping, Lian Po became the commander of Zhao's army again to stop the invasion of Yan. He defeated the Yan army, but in his later years, he was distrusted by the King of Zhao. Therefore, he decided to escape to Wei, and then to Chu. He died in Shouchun, the capital of the Chu state, living long enough to see the gradual demise of the country he once served.

== Popular culture ==
In the manga and anime Kingdom, he is known as "Ren Pa" and despite his often cheerful personality, he's widely considered one of the most feared and respected Generals across China, a former member of the previous generation of the "Three Great Heavens of Zhao".

He was proficient in different types of warfare.

He left Zhao after he disagreed with King Daoxiang's tyrant method of leadership. He then went to Wei, but ended up being exiled after his defeat by Qin, after that he settled in Shouchun, in Chu. There, he still remains an honourable "guest" in the Chu state.
