= The Legend of Mi Yue =

Chinese name
- Traditional Chinese: 羋月传
- Simplified Chinese: 芈月传
Transcriptions
Standard Mandarin
- Hanyu Pinyin: Mǐ Yuè Zhuàn
- Genre: Historical fiction
- Based on: Miyue Zhuan by Jiang Shengnan
- Written by: Jiang Shengnan; Wang Xiaoping
- Directed by: Zheng Xiaolong
- Starring: Sun Li; Liu Tao; Alex Fong; Huang Xuan; Gao Yunxiang; Ma Su
- Opening theme: Full Moon by Chen Sisi
- Ending theme: Beauty is a Dream by Henry Huo; West Wind by Alu Azhuo
- Country of origin: China
- Original language: Mandarin
- No. of episodes: 81

Production
- Executive producer: Cao Ping
- Production locations: Inner Mongolia; Zhuzhou; Beijing Expo Park; Xiangshan; Hengdian World Studios
- Production companies: Dongyang Flowers Film and Television Culture Co., LTD. Ruyi Xinxin Pictures; Xianggela Film and Television Culture Dissemination Co., LTD.

Original release
- Network: Dragon TV; Beijing TV
- Release: 30 November 2015 – 9 January 2016

The Legend of Mi Yue (Chinese: 羋月傳; pinyin: Mǐ Yuè Zhuàn; Wade–Giles: Mi^{3} Yüeh^{4} Chuan^{4}) is a 2015 Chinese television series directed by Zheng Xiaolong and based on Jiang Shengnan's eponymous historical novel. It stars Sun Li in the title role of Mi Yue. The series aired 2 episodes daily on Beijing TV and Dragon TV from 30 November 2015 to 9 January 2016.

== Synopsis ==
This is a story about the life of Mi Yue, the first stateswoman and Queen Dowager (Chinese: 太后; pinyin: tàihòu) in China's history.

Mi Yue was a young princess who lived in the Kingdom of Chu during the Warring States period. Her childhood was not peaceful, after witnessing her mother falling into the schemes of the Queen of Chu. Yet, she was on good relations with her sister, Mi Shu and her father, King Wei. She was eventually sent to Qin as a concubine as part of her sister's dowry, separating her from Huang Xie, her first love. Mi Yue gains the favor of King Ying Si and gives birth to a son named Ying Ji. This leads to the jealousy of Mi Shu, Wei Yan, the queen, and other concubines.

After King Ying Si passes away, Ying Dang becomes his successor. Mi Yue is sent as an ambassador (banishment) to the State of Yan with her son Ying Ji. However, King Ying Dang suddenly dies after lifting weights, leaving Qin in a state of chaos where Ying Si's sons are battling for the throne. Mi Yue enlists the help of the "barbarian" Yiqu army, successfully returning to Qin, suppressing political revolts and instates her son Ying Ji on the throne.

== Cast ==
=== Main characters ===
Cast	Role	Description
Susan Sun	Mi Yue: Liu Chutian as 4-5-years-old Princess Yue; Li Jing'er as 7-8-years-old Princess Yue; Chai Wei as 12-13-years-old Princess Yue; Princess Yue of Chu (楚國公主)→Consort Mi (羋八子)→Mother of Qin (秦國質子之母)→Lady Consort of Yiqu (義渠王妃)→Queen Dowager Xuan of Qin (秦宣太后)	Most favourite daughter of King Wei of Chu, born from Concubine Xiang. Talented and highly perceptive, she was persecuted by the Queen of Chu since childhood due to an astrologer's prophecy. After the death of King Wei, she was rushed to the cemetery to guard her father's spirit and was ordered to only return after she grows up. She initially fell in love and agreed to marry Huang Xie, a renowned scholar and a bosom childhood friend, but for the sake of her half sister, Princess Shu's dowry, she instead married Ying Si, King Huiwen of Qin and bore him Ying Ji. After King Huiwen's death, she went to the State of Yan as a hostage along with her son and lived a life of hardship. After the death of Ying Dang, the King Wu of Great Qin, Queen Huiwen's only son, she married Zhai Li, the Lord of Yiqu and bore him Ying Fu. With help from Zhai Li and his people, she installs her son Ying Ji as the new King and is proclaimed as the Queen Dowager.
Liu Tao	Mi Shu: Li Nini as 6-years-old Grand Princess; Hao Yilin as 8-years-old Grand PrincessGrand Princess of Chu (楚國公主)→Queen of Great Qin (秦國王后)→Queen Huiwen of Great Qin (秦惠文后)	Daughter of King Wei of Chu from his Queen. Initially, she was a gentle and a kind girl who took Princess Yue everywhere and matched her and the Scholar Huang Xie when they were still in the Chu Palace. She fell in love with King Huiwen at first sight and later married him as she wished, but fell out of favor due to being framed, and later gave birth to Ying Dang, the later King Wu. Since Consort Mi and Madame Wei were increasingly favored by him, she got jealous and tried every means to deal with Consort Mi and her Son. Their sisterly relationship then broke down after Consort Mi comes into light about Queen Mi's schemes. After King Huiwen's death, she was crowned as Queen Hui and banished Consort Mi and her son to the State of Yan as hostages, while arranging for hitmen and the locals to harm them. After her son, King Wu's death, she tried to help her adopted son Prince Zhuang ascend the throne while creating chaos in the court. She failed and was placed under house arrest by the Queen Dowager. Spent the rest of her life in Qingliang Hall (清涼殿) under constant supervision.

- Ma Su as Wei Yan
  - Lady Wei of Wei (魏氏) → Madame Wei of Qin(魏夫人)
  - A Lady from the State of Wei, sister of Wei Zhang and aunt of Wei Yi. Ambitious, sinister and cunning, she wants to become the Queen of Qin and hopes that her son will become the next King while she repeatedly targeting Mi Yue and Mi Shu. She later died at Yongcheng.
- Alex Fong as Ying Si
  - Prince Si (公子絲)→Crown Prince (太子)→ King of Qin (秦王)→ 𝘒𝘪𝘯𝘨 𝘏𝘶𝘪𝘸𝘦𝘯 𝘰𝘧 𝘘𝘪𝘯(秦惠文王)
  - A strategic, farsighted and a compassionate ruler with the ambition to conquer the world. He falls in love with Princess Yue and becomes the father of Ying Ji, born by Consort Mi, Ying Dang, born by Queen Mi and Ying Hua, born by Madame Wei.
- Huang Xuan as Huang Xie
  - Lord Chunshen, the Prince of Chu (楚公子 春申君)
    - Gu Haofeng as 10-years-old Huang Xie
    - Ding Nan as 15/6-years-old Huang Xie
  - Qu Yuan's disciple who is loyal to his motherland. He is Mi Yue's first love and childhood sweetheart. He accidentally fell off a cliff to save her right as they were about to elope, and temporarily loses his memory. He studies with Crown Prince Heng of Chu and helps him ascend the throne. He eventually becomes the Prime Minister of Chu. Years later, a young scholar who looks just like him, Wei Choufu, becomes a reading companion to the Queen Dowager Xuan.
- Gao Yunxiang as Zhai Li
  - King of Yiqu (義渠王)→Lord of Yiqu (義渠君)
  - The ruler of Yiqu and Consort Mi's second husband—father of Prince Fu. His title of King was demoted to Lord (Jūn) after returning his land to the State of Qin. For his lifelong love towards Consort Mi, he is willing to bear the pain of witchcraft rituals to save her life. When the conflict between Yiqu and Qin gradually deepened, he left the Qin Palace. He later led Yiqu troops into the Palace to rebel but was killed, leaving Mi Yue sad and sick for months and aging rapidly thereafter.

=== Supporting ===
==== State of Chu ====
- Winston Chao as King Wei of Chu
  - The ruler of the Chu State and father of Mi Huai, Mi Yin, Mi Shu, Mi Yue, Mi Rong. When he returned home gloriously after war, he learns Mi Yue that Consort Xiang was sent out of the palace after being framed by the Queen. He was furious and gave the queen a death sentence. Angered by his son, he died suddenly in the palace.
- Jiang Hongbo as Queen Wei of Chu
  - Primary wife of King Wei, Mi Huai and Mi Shu's biological mother who later was given a death sentence.
- Li Beilei as Dai Mao
  - A close-knit maid of Queen Wei who followed Mi Shu to Qin State, always guarding against Mi Yue. She was executed after trying to make Mi Yue die from a difficult childbirth.
- Jiang Xin as Consort Ju
  - Formerly the "Princess of the Ju State" (莒國公主) who becomes the favourite consort of King Wei and foster mother of Mi Yue and Mi Rong. After the King's death, she hanged herself to protect Mi Yue and Mi Rong from death.
- Sun Qian as Lady Xiang
  - "Madame Xiang" (向夫人)→"Consort Xiang" (向妃)
  - A dowry maid of Consort Ju, she then becomes the biological mother of Mi Yue, Mi Rong and Wei Ran. She was framed by the Queen and sent out of the palace, then raped and gave birth to Wei Ran. She was taken back to the palace by the King, but knew that she would not live long after returning there, so she framed the queen by putting poisonous wine in the queen's bottle and drinking it herself. When the King came, she told him that the queen poisoned her, then she died.
- Tian Yixi as Zhen Zhu, Mi Shu's confidant.
- Liu Zihe as Shan Hu, Mi Shu's confidant who later committed suicide due to the killer bee incident.
- Ren Han as Lü Luo, pure-hearted woman who becomes Mi Shu's personal maid, but later beaten to death due to Mi Shu and King Ying Si.
- Cao Zheng as Mi Huai
  - "Crown Prince of Chu" (楚太子)→"King of Chu" (楚王)→"King Huai of Chu" (楚怀王)
  - Legitimate son of King Wei, from Queen Wei and a brother of Mi Shu. Although knows that his mother hates Mi Yue, he still sometimes speaks for her.
- Xu Fanxi as Mi Yin
  - "Princess (born from concubine) Yin of the Chu State" (楚國茵(庶)公主)→"Madame of Yan State" (燕國國相夫人)
    - Su Chenxi as 8-years-old Mi Yin
  - Daughter of King Wei and Princess Wei who later becomes the wife of Guo Kui. During Mi Yue's stay in the Yan, she framed her many times. Tried to poison Mi Yue but her plan backfired when her husband gives her the poison instead, killing her.
- Yuan Zhibo as Zheng Xiu
  - "Queen Nan" (南后)
  - King Huai's primary wife who is secretly conniving. She often disagrees with Queen Wei, knowing that the queen hates Mi Yue, and deliberately helps Mi Yue a lot.
- Lu Ying as Lian'er, Queen Nan's maid
- He Dujuan as Lady Wei
  - "Beauty Wei" (魏美人)
  - Wei State-born woman who was given to King Huai. Due to Queen Nan's jealousy, she is hidden at the remote Zhanghua Terrace (章華台). Gentle and simple, no scheming, good at dispelling depression, she befriends Mi Yue and is on good terms with her. She didn't listen to Mi Yue's suggestion to guard against Queen Nan, who manipulated her because of jealousy, resulting in King Huai cutting off her nose. Thereafter she committed suicide.
- Li Hongliang as Mi Rong
  - "Prince (born from concubine) of the Chu State" (楚國(庶)公子)→"Lord of Huayang" (華陽君)→"Lord of Xincheng" (新城君)
    - Li Qingyu as 2-years-old Mi Rong
    - Li Zekai as 7/8-years-old Mi Rong
    - Lou Zixuan as 11/2-years-old Mi Rong
  - Son of King Wei and Consort Xiang, also a younger brother of Mi Yue whom after her marriage to Qin, he stayed alone in Chu.
- Su Hang as Mi Heng, son of King Huai
  - "Crown Prince of Chu" (楚太子)→"King of Chu" (楚王)
    - Wu Bolin as 13-years-old Mi Heng
    - Zhou Qi as 16-years-old Mi Heng
- Liu Xinyu as the "Little Princess of Chu State" (楚国小公主)
- Zu Feng as Qu Yuan, Prime minister of Chu.
- Jiang Feng as Jin Shang
  - A greedy and despicable man who becomes the Prime Minister of Chu. As one of Zheng Xiu's confidants, he always opposed Qu Yuan.
- Shi Yueling as Female Doctor
  - Bian Que's disciple with superb medical skills and good heart, she delivered Mi Yue and later Mi Yuen's son. She followed when Mi Shu married to live in Qin. After Ying Dang's death, when the political situation was still undecided, she went up the mountain to collect medicine, but was killed by a rebellious army.
- Zheng Yecheng as Song Yu, a poet of Chu.
- Liu Yijun as Tang Mei
  - An astrologer who predicted the dominance theory, but Lady Xiang gave birth to a daughter instead of a son, so King Wei dug out his eyes in anger. He later died to save Mi Yue.
- Sun Shuaihang as Zhao Yang
- Zhang Yujian as Tang Le
- Liu Ziming as Young Master Feng
- Xie Ziyi as Mi Qing

==== State of Qin ====
- Cai Wenyan as Lady Ying
  - "Madame Ying" (嬴夫人)
  - Adopted mother of Meng Ying. Initially was a crown princess of the Wei State. Secretly helped Qin win the war and was divorced and exiled by her husband (the current ruler of Wei). Lived in northern suburbs palace in Qin. She befriends Yong Rui and kept the edict for King Ying Xi, then died after Mi Shu set fire to the palace in order to force her to surrender the edict.
- Song Jialun as Ying Ji (Chulizi 樗里子)
  - Half brother of Ying Si who have no desire to fight for the throne and is deeply trusted by him. He later assists Ying Dang and Ying Ji. Held the post of Left Militia General and Left Chancellor (Senior Prime Minister).
- Xiao Hui as Lady Tang
  - "Madame Tang" (唐夫人)
  - Came from the State of Tang, she is the oldest member in Ying Si's harem who served as his consort since he was still a crown prince. Good-natured and honest, she is a good friend of Miyue, also the mother of Ying Huan.
- Tao Hui as Lady Guo
  - "Beauty Guo" (虢美人)
  - Came from the State of Guo, she is famous for her beauty among the consorts in the harem, but her personality is simpler and easy to be instigated by others. She actually wanted to frame Mi Shu, but accidentally hanged herself.
- Yin Xu as Lady Wei
  - "Virtuous Lady Wei" (卫良人)
  - Came from the State of Wey, she is the mother of Ying Feng and Ying Chi. A smart and alert woman who is one of Mi Yue's good friend in the palace.
- Lan Xi as Lady Fan
  - "Junior Palace Woman Fan" (樊少使)→"Senior Palace Woman Fan" (樊長使)
  - Came from the State of Fan, she is the mother of Ying Tong. Timid and fearful woman who befriends with Mi Yue. After her son committed suicide, in front of King Ying Si, she firstly sued Mi Shu for the poisonous bee stinging case.
- Wei Yi as Lady Wei
  - "Junior Palace Woman Wei" (魏少使)→"Senior Palace Woman Wei" (魏長使)
  - Niece of Wei Yan and mother of Ying Zhuang. A sinister woman who is obeys her aunt's orders and is hostile to Mi Shu. She committed suicide to protect Madame Wei.
- Jing Xingwen as Kui Gu
  - Personal maid of Consort Ju who followed Mi Yue to Qin and later died during Mi Yue's stay in Yan for saved Ying Ji from the bees stung.
- Chen Chuyue as Xiang'er, Mi Yue's confidant
- Chen Yu as Hui'er, Mi Yue's confidant
- Zhang Ranyi as Cai Lü, Lady Wei's palace maid
- Xu Baihui as Lady Mengzhao
  - Niece of Zhao Yang from the Chu State and a maid of Mi Shu. Superficial and arrogant, she secretly colluded with Wei Yan and was later sentenced to death by King Ying Si.
- Liu Yihong as Lady Jing
  - Jin Zhi as young Lady Jing
  - A woman born into a poor family who becomes a maid of Mi Shu alongside Meng Zhao.
- Chi Jia as Ying Hua
  - "Prince Hua" (公子華)
    Eldest son of King Ying Si, born by Wei Yan. He later led a group of soldiers to rebel and fight for the throne, but failed and was beheaded by Mi Yue.
- Bao Luojun as Ying Hui
  - "Prince Hui" (公子恢)
    One of the royal prince of Qin who get killed by Ying Hua during the princes' chaos.
- ... as Ying Huan
  - "Prince Huan" (公子奐)→"Marquess of Shu" (蜀侯)
    Son of King Ying Si and Lady Tang who later murdered by his subordinates.
- Liu Ziming as Ying Feng
  - "Prince Feng" (公子封)
    First son of King Ying Si and Lady Wey.
- Xue Yongyu as Ying Tong
  - "Prince Tong" (公子通)
    Son of King Ying Si and Lady Fan who had a good relationship with Ying Ji. He committed suicide after suffering a lot of humiliation and bullying.
    - Cao Yingrui as 7/9-years-old Ying Tong
    - Lei Haowen as 11/2-years-old Ying Tong
- Gao Rui as 12-years-old Ying Zhuang
  - "Prince Zhuang" (公子壮)
    Son of King Ying Si and Lady Wei who was raised by Mi Shu. A conscientious man who is later beheaded by Mi Yue for following Ying Hua's rebellion.
    - Huang Zuocan as 15-years-old Ying Zhuang
    - Chen Weichen as 20-years-old Ying Zhuang
- Ba Tu as Ying Dang
  - "Prince (born from queen) of the Qin State" (秦國嫡公子)→"Crown Prince of Qin" (秦太子)→"King of Qin" (秦王)→"King Wu of Qin" (秦武王)
    - Yu Tianyang as 2/4-years-old Ying Dang
    - Luqing Fuyuan as 7/9-years-old Ying Dang
    - Yang Jiahua as 10/2-years-old Ying Dang
  - King Ying Si's legitimate son, born by Mi Shu. Loves contests, conquests, use of aggression, and didn't like to study so his understanding of governance policies were limited. His policies was more based on physical prowess. He married the Princess of the Wei State, Wei Yi and ascended the throne as the new King to succeed his father, but died in Luoyang while showing off his physical prowess after reigning for just about three years.
- Zhu Yilong as Ying Ji
  - "Prince (born from concubine) of the Qin State" (秦國庶公子)→"Proton of the Qin State" (秦國質子)→"King of Qin" (秦王)→"King Zhaoxiang of Qin" (秦昭襄王)
    - Zhang Haoting as 2/3-years-old Ying Ji
    - Shiyue Anxin as 6/8-years-old Ying Ji
    - Chen Hongjin as 9/12-years-old Ying Ji
  - Youngest son of King Ying Si and Mi Yue who is clever since childhood and has a kingly appearance. He ascended the throne at a young age, so his mother took charge of the royal administration. He married the Princess of the Chu State, Mi Yao and had a son named Ying Zhu.
- Xu Luyang as Ying Zhu, Son of Ying Ji and Mi Yao.
- Ma Sichun as Wei Yi
  - "Princess of the Wei State" (魏國公主)→"Crown Princess of Qin" (秦太子妃)→"Queen of Qin" (秦王后)→"Queen Wu of Qin" (秦武王后)
  - Daughter of the King of the Wei State and a niece of Wei Yan. She becomes the primary wife of Ying Dang and later his queen following his ascension to the throne. After the troubles of the princes were settled, Mi Yue sent her back to her homeland, the Wei State.
- Sun Yi as Mi Yao
  - "Princess (born from concubine) of the Chu State" (楚國庶公主)→"Queen of Qin" (秦王后)
  - Daughter of King Huai of Chu and Beauty Zhao. As they were disliked by Zheng Xiu, so they suffered a lot of grievances in the Chu Palace. Gentle and considerate, she is good at cooking, but later died due to Shoulder dystocia.
- Shi Jingming as Shang Yang
  - "Lord Shang of the Qin State" (秦国商君)
    Sentenced to die after Ying Si ascended the throne.
- Zhao Lixin as Zhang Yi
  - Initially a doorman of Yin Zhaoyang in the Chu State, but due to the theft, he was under suspicion and was beaten brutally. He has since become discouraged with Chu State. He was a good strategist and assisted King Ying Si with his gift of talking and often secretly helped Mi Yue. After Ying Dang ascended the throne, he resigned due to his disharmony with the new king and returned to his homeland the Wei State, where he died shortly afterwards.
- Gong Zheng as Yong Rui
  - A nobleman from the Yong State who becomes a confidant of King Ying Si and Madame Ying. Eventually helping Mi Yue as she becomes the Empress Dowager.
- Jin Tiefeng as Gan Mao
  - The Right Chancellor (Junior Prime Minister). He befriended Mi Shu and Ying Dang, strained the relationship between Mi Shu and Mi Yue, then fled to Wei State.
- Cao Weiyu as Gongsun Yan
  - A great alliance of King Ying Si in opposition to Zhang Yi. He collaborated with the Yiqu peoples to hijack the welcoming convoy and fled to the Wei State after his deeds were revealed.
- Li Junfeng as Sima Cuo
  - The famous general of the Qin State who has led Qin to victory many times. He is Wei Ran's mentor and is at odds with Gan Mao.
- Sun Boyang as Meng Ao
  - The famous general of the Qin State who escorted Mi Shu to get married with Qin. He is disgusting yet kind.
- Zhang Junhan as Wei Ran
  - "Major General" (裨将军)→"Ranghou" (穰侯)→"State Minister of the Qin State" (秦國國相)
    - Yin Ronghao as 5-years-old Wei Ran
    - Yue Xunyu as 9/12-years-old Wei Ran
  - Mi Yue's younger half-brother, born after Lady Xiang was raped. Mi Yue and Wei Ran have a strong sibling bond.
- Zeng Hongchang as Bai Qi
  - "Warlord of Yiqu" (義渠戰將)→"Lord Wu of An" (武安君)→"Grand Official of the Qin State" (秦國大良造)
    - Yang Yanduo as 9-years-old Bai Qi
    - Qiu Muyuan as 15-years-old Bai Qi
  - Initially lived with the Yiqu people, but later lived among wolves. Knew the habits of human beings but did not understand the human language. He often led the wolves to Yiqu to steal sheep. He is recognized as Mi Yue's younger brother, and she changes his name from "Xiao Lang" (Small Wolf 小狼) to Bai Qi. He is taken care of by King Yiqu. Later follows Wei Ran and becomes a general in the Qin State.
- Xu Wenguang as Mu Jian
  - A eunuch next to King Ying Si. He is resourceful and loyal, and helped Mi Yue many times. Forced to death by Mi Shu not long after Ying Si died.
- An Xiaoge as Mu Xin
  - Mu Jian's apprentice who later becomes Mi Yue's confidant and served her, also became a eunuch next to Mi Yue and Ying Ji.
- Liu Tingzuo as Feng Jia
  - A godson of Mu Jian and a confidant of Mi Shu and Ying Dang who is very scheming while later betrays them.
- ... as Ying Chi
  - "Prince Chi" (公子池)
    Younger son of King Ying Si and Lady Wey, also Ying Feng's full younger brother who later surrender to Ying Ji.
- ... as Ying Yong
  - "Prince Yong" (公子雍)
    Second son of King Ying Si who later surrender to Ying Ji.

==== Yiqu peoples ====
- Hai Zi as Hu Wei
  - Zhai Li's number one subordinate with a fierce and impulsive demeanor, but is very loyal to him. He once saved Zhai Li and is close to him like a brother. He grows frustrated and restless with Qin life and creates trouble with the Qin locals. Commits suicide to prevent war between Qin and Yiqu.
- Kong Qingsan as an Old witch
  - The old member of Yiqu who knows sacrificial rituals and divination, understands ghosts and gods, and is respected by all the people of Yiqu. He is Zhai Li's military adviser.

==== State of Yan ====
- Mao Junjie as Meng Ying
  - "Queen Yi of Yan" (燕易王后), former Princess of the Qin State who married with King Yi of Yan.
- ... as King Zhao of Yan, son of Meng Ying.
- Niu Baojun as Guo Kui, Minister of Yan State who becomes the husband of Mi Yin.
- Yu Siqiong as Ling'er, Mi Yin's maid who helped Mi Yue privately many times and later exposed Mi Yin's evil deeds.
- Yang Kun as Wu Po, an enthusiastic for helping others, introducing her work and Zhen Sao's residence to Mi Yue.
- Yang Kaichun as Zhen Sao, a woman in Yan state's West City who is killed in a dispute between officers and soldiers sent by Mi Yin to frame Mi Yue.

==== Others ====
- Zhang Xiaoheng as Su Qin, Prime Minister of the Six States and lover of Meng Ying.
- Qiao Han as Su Dai, younger brother of Su Qin.
- Li Jiao as the fake Mi Shu, a cooking girl.
- Dong Danjun as a Beekeeper who once helped Huang Xie when he had amnesia.
- Jiang Wenli as the Beekeeper's wife
- Ta La as King Nan of Zhou, last ruler of Eastern Zhou who is weak and sick.
- Tan Yang as Lin Xiangru, Prime Minister of the Zhao state.
- Xiao Yating as Mei'er

== Production ==
Filming started on September 6, 2014, and ended on 29 January 2015. The television series took place in Inner Mongolia, Zhuzhou, Beijing Expo Park, Xiangshan, and Hengdian World Studios.

== Soundtrack ==
Mainland Chinese

No.	Title	Lyrics	Music	Singer	Length
1.	"Full Moon (满月)" (Opening theme)	Chen Tao	Wang Bei	Chen Sisi
2.	"Beauty Is a Dream (伊人如梦)" (Pre-credit)	He Qiling	A Kun	Henry Huo
3.	"West Wind (西风)" (Ending theme)	Chen Tao	Wang Bei	Alu Azhuo

== Reception ==
The series initially attracted attention due to its predecessor, Empresses in the Palace, which is also directed by Zheng Xiaolong and stars Sun Li. During its broadcast, it attained high ratings and over 20 billion views online. However, the series did not receive the same critical acclaim and only has a Douban score of 5.5/10. Viewers feel that the plot of Mi Yue, which involves court intrigue between queens and concubines, was no longer fresh. The series has also been criticized for historical inaccuracies, plot (inconsistency and slow pace) and production quality.

=== Controversy ===
The production team of the series sued Jiang Shengnan, a scriptwriter on the show, for violating her contract. Jiang had published her novel, a 7,000-character section of The Legend of Mi Yue, online in August 2015 before the series aired. Jiang was dissatisfied with the production team for not recognizing her contributions to the show. The Beijing Chaoyang District Court ruled in favor of the production team. This sparked a discussion about authors writing scripts for adaptations on screen in China.

=== Ratings ===
Broadcast date	Episode	Dragon TV CSM50 ratings			Beijing TV CSM50 ratings		
Broadcast date	Episode	Ratings (%)	Audience share (%)	Rank	Ratings (%)	Audience share (%)	Rank
2015.11.30	1–2	1.56	4.16	2	1.726	4.60	1
2015.12.1	3–4	2.27	5.95	1	1.941	5.08	2
2015.12.2	5–6	1.954	5.13	1	1.951	5.13	2
2015.12.3	7–8	1.898	4.88	2	2.329	5.99	1
2015.12.4	9–10	2.123	5.48	2	2.193	5.66	1
2015.12.5	11–12	2.138	5.41	1	2.128	5.39	2
2015.12.6	13–14	2.192	5.68	2	2.209	5.73	1
2015.12.7	15–16	2.366	6.22	1	2.27	5.98	2
2015.12.8	17–18	2.424	6.31	2	2.544	6.60	1
2015.12.9	19–20	2.537	6.54	1	2.522	6.49	2
2015.12.10	21–22	2.667	6.96	1	2.524	6.57	2
2015.12.11	23–24	2.548	6.50	2	2.576	6.57	1
2015.12.12	25–26	2.478	6.40	2	2.72	7.04	1
2015.12.13	27–28	2.831	7.05	1	2.773	6.90	2
2015.12.14	29–30	2.821	7.21	1	2.533	6.46	2
2015.12.15	31–32	2.893	7.5	1	2.536	6.57	2
2015.12.16	33–34	2.708	6.99	1	2.474	6.37	2
2015.12.17	35–36	2.751	7.03	1	2.58	6.58	2
2015.12.18	37–38	2.794	7.19	1	2.565	6.6	2
2015.12.19	39–40	2.58	6.54	2	2.701	6.85	1
2015.12.20	41–42	2.919	7.28	1	2.805	6.99	2
2015.12.21	43–44	2.712	7.011	1	2.712	7.001	2
2015.12.22	45–46	2.94	7.59	1	2.83	7.29	2
2015.12.23	47–48	2.989	7.77	1	2.802	7.28	2
2015.12.24	49–50	2.718	7.21	1	2.686	7.12	2
2015.12.25	51–52	2.792	7.26	2	2.887	7.52	1
2015.12.26	53–54	2.862	7.27	2	2.994	7.48	1
2015.12.27	55–56	3.354	8.32	1	3.178	7.88	2
2015.12.28	57–58	3.363	8.75	1	3.083	8.01	2
2015.12.29	59–60	3.465	8.88	1	3.294	8.44	2
2015.12.30	61–62	3.395	8.82	1	3.367	8.74	2
2015.12.31	63–64	3.291	7.929	1	3.131	7.55	2
2016.1.1	65–66	3.353	8.63	2	3.417	8.8	1
2016.1.2	67–68	3.593	9.17	1	3.427	8.15	2
2016.1.3	69–70	3.741	9.31	2	3.747	9.34	1
2016.1.4	71–72	3.87	9.77	1	3.63	9.18	2
2016.1.5	73–74	3.739	9.42	1	3.597	9.07	2
2016.1.6	75–76	3.634	9.23	1	3.411	8.67	2
2016.1.7	77–78	3.607	9.27	1	3.46	8.9	2
2016.1.8	79–80	3.461	8.85	1	3.364	8.6	2
2016.1.9	81	3.303	8.47	1	3.213	8.23	2
Average ratings		2.867	7.36	-	2.809	7.21	-

=== Awards and nominations ===
Award	Category	Nominated work	Result
1st China Quality Television Drama Ceremony	Quality Grand Award		Won
1st China Quality Television Drama Ceremony	Audience Favorite TV Series (Dragon TV)		Won
1st China Quality Television Drama Ceremony	Outstanding Director Achievement Award	Zheng Xiaolong	Won
1st China Quality Television Drama Ceremony	Most Popular Actress	Liu Tao (also for Nirvana in Fire)	Won
19th Huading Awards	Best Director	Zheng Xiaolong	Nominated
19th Huading Awards	Best Screenwriter	Wang Xiaoping, Jiang Shengnan	Nominated
19th Huading Awards	Best Actress	Sun Li	Nominated
19th Huading Awards	Best Actor (Ancient Drama)	Gao Yunxiang	Won
19th Huading Awards	Best Actor (Ancient Drama)	Alex Fong	Nominated
19th Huading Awards	Best Supporting Actress	Ma Su	Nominated
19th Huading Awards	Best Producer	Cao Ping	Won
19th Huading Awards	Top 10 Dramas		Won
22nd Shanghai Television Festival	Best Television Series		Won
22nd Shanghai Television Festival	Best Director	Zheng Xiaolong	Nominated
22nd Shanghai Television Festival	Best Actress	Sun Li	Won
22nd Shanghai Television Festival	Best Supporting Actress	Liu Tao	Won
28th China TV Golden Eagle Award	Outstanding Television Series		Won
28th China TV Golden Eagle Award	Best Director	Zheng Xiaolong	Won
28th China TV Golden Eagle Award	Best Actress	Liu Tao	Nominated
28th China TV Golden Eagle Award	Best Actress	Ma Su	Nominated
28th China TV Golden Eagle Award	Best Actress	Xu Baihui	Nominated
28th China TV Golden Eagle Award	Most Popular Actress	Liu Tao	Won
3rd Hengdian Film and TV Festival of China	Best Drama		Won
3rd Hengdian Film and TV Festival of China	Best Director	Zheng Xiaolong	Won
3rd Hengdian Film and TV Festival of China	Best Supporting Actor	Xu Wenguang	Won
3rd Asia Rainbow TV Awards	Best Historical Drama		Won
3rd Asia Rainbow TV Awards	Best Director	Zheng Xiaolong	Won
3rd Asia Rainbow TV Awards	Best OST	"Full Moon"	Won
2nd Sino-American Int'l TV Festival	Best Screenwriter	Wang Xiaoping	Nominated
12th Chinese American Film Festival	Golden Angel Award for Outstanding Chinese TV Series		Won
11th National Top-Notch Television Production Award Ceremony	Outstanding Television Series		Won
8th China TV Drama Awards	Best Director	Zheng Xiaolong	Won
8th China TV Drama Awards	Breakthrough Spirit Award	Ma Su	Won

== Broadcast ==
Channel	location	Broadcast date	Remark
Beijing TV, Dragon TV	Mainland China	November 30, 2015	Monday to Sunday 19:35 - 21:00 (two eps)
Anhui TV	Mainland China	December 8, 2015	Daily 22:00
Hebei TV, Zhejiang TV	Mainland China	May 22, 2016	Daily 23:05

International broadcast

Channel	location	Broadcast date	Remark
KSCI LA18 TV	Los Angeles USA	March 2, 2016	Monday to Friday 19:00 - 20:00 (One eps)
Astro Quan Jia HD	Malaysia	February 1, 2016	Mon-Fri 19:00
Jia Le Channel	Singapore	March 24, 2016	Mon-Fri 22:00
CTS Main Channel	Taiwan	April 4, 2016	Mon-Fri 20:00-22:00
Oh!K	Singapore, Malaysia; Indonesia, Philippines, Thailand, Hong Kong	Coming Soon	Wed-Fri 18:00-19:50

== See also ==
- The Legend of Zhen Huan (2011)
- Ruyi's Royal Love in the Palace (2017)
