= Prime minister (Chu State) =

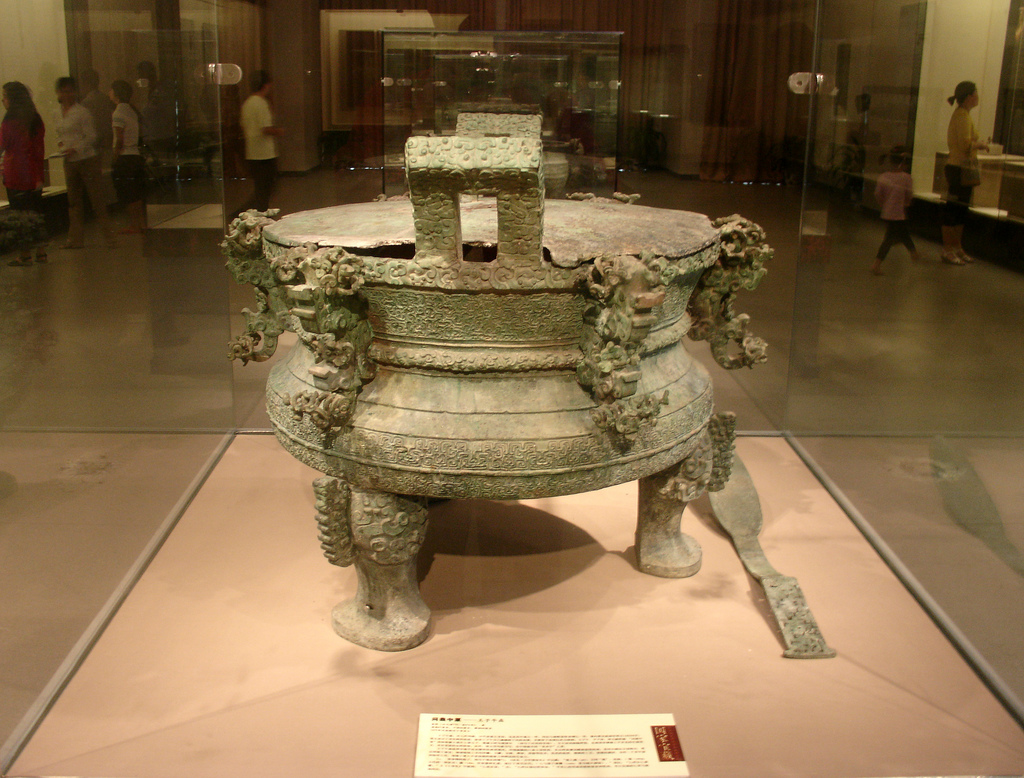
王子午鼎, a Bronze Vessel of prime minister Zigeng Xiong Wu

The post of prime minister (Chinese: 令尹; pinyin: Lìngyǐn), translated as prime minister or chancellor, was an official government position established in the Chu state during the Spring and Autumn period of Chinese history (771 – 475 BCE).

King Wu of Chu (reigned 740 – 690 BCE) first established the position of prime minister which remained the most important government office in Chu until its destruction by the Qin state in 223 BCE

The post was normally given to a member of the Chu king's family and records show that only two Chu prime ministers were not related to the Chu king. They were Peng Zhongshuang (彭仲爽), a civilian from the Shen state, at the time of King Wen of Chu (reigned 689 – 677 BCE) and the Wei general Wu Qi during the reign of King Dao of Chu (reigned 401 – 381 BCE).

== List of prime ministers ==
The first recorded prime minister in Chu's history was Dou Qi of Ruo'ao clan. Qi and Mo'ao(One of the three top chancellors of Chu) Qu Chong together invaded the state of Sui in 690 BCE. The following is a list of prime ministers:

- Dou Qi
- Peng Zhongshuang, originally from the state of Shen(申).
- Vacant or unknown 674 BCE-667 BCE
- Xiong Shan, son of King Wu of Chu. also known by the title plus his courtesy name "Prime Minister Ziyuan"(令尹子元).
- Dou Guwutu, son of Dou Bobi, also known by the title plus his courtesy name "Prime Minister Ziwen"(令尹子文).
- Cheng Decheng, also known by the title plus his courtesy name "Prime Minister Ziyu"(令尹子玉).
- Wei Lüchen, also known by the title plus his courtesy name "Prime Minister Zipi"(令尹子皮).
- Dou Bo, also known by the title plus his courtesy name "Prime Minister Zishang"(令尹子上).
- Cheng Daxin, son of Cheng Decheng. Also known as Prime Minister Dasunbo(令尹大孫伯).
- Cheng Jia, brother of Daxin. also known by the title plus his courtesy name "Prime Minister Zikong"(令尹子孔).
- Dou Yuejiao, nephew of Dou Guwutu. also known by the title plus his courtesy name "Prime Minister Ziyue"(令尹子越).
- Sunshu Ao, son of Wei Jia.
- Xiong Yingqi, son of King Mu of Chu. also known by the title plus his courtesy name "Prime Minister Zichong"(令尹子重).
- Xiong Renfu, brother of Yingqi. also known by the title plus his courtesy name "Prime Minister Zixing"(令尹子辛).
- Xiong Zhen, son of King Zhuang of Chu. First recorded Shenyin before being promoted to Prime Minister. Also known by the title plus his courtesy name "Prime Minister Zinang"(令尹子囊).
- Xiong Wu, brother of Zhen. Also known by the title plus his courtesy name "Prime Minister Zigeng"(令尹子庚).
- Xiong Zhuishu, also known by the title plus his courtesy name "Prime Minister Zinan"(令尹子南).
- Wei Zifeng
- Qu Jian, also known by the title plus his courtesy name "Prime Minister Zimu" (令尹子木).
- Xiong Wei, prince Wei. Later became King Ling of Chu.
- Wei Ba, also known by the title plus his courtesy name "Prime Minister Zidang" (令尹子盪).
- Dou Chengran, a descendant of Dou Guwutu. also known by the title plus his courtesy name "Prime Minister Ziqi" (令尹子旗).
- Yang Gai, a great grandson of King Mu of Chu.also known by the title plus his courtesy name "Prime Minister Zixia" (令尹子瑕).
- Nang Wa, also known by the title plus his courtesy name "Prime Minister Zichang" (令尹子常).
- Xiong Shen, also known by the title plus his courtesy name "Prime Minister Zixi" (令尹子西).
- Shen Zhuliang, also known by the title plus his courtesy name "Prime Minister Zigao" (令尹子高).
- Xiong Ning, son of Shen. Also known by the title plus his courtesy name "Prime Minister Ziguo" (令尹子國).
- Unknown from 475 BCE to 447 BCE.
- Jing She, also known by the title plus his courtesy name "Prime Minister Zifa" (令尹子發). 447 BCE to ?
- Unknown Prime Ministers
- Zhao Chun, Prime Minister during late 5th century BCE.
- Unknown Prime Ministers
- Wu Qi, Prime Minister between 386 BCE and 381 BCE. Originally from Wey. Murdered by Chu aristocrats on the funeral of King Dao of Chu.
- Zhouhou, Prime Minister during the reign of King Xuan of Chu.
- Zhao Xixu, Prime Minister during the reign of King Xuan of Chu.
- Xiong Qi, a prince of Chu, also known by the title plus his courtesy name "Prime Minister Zixi"(令尹子皙).
- Zhao Yang, Prime Minister during the reign of King Wei of Chu.
- Prime Minister Zijiao. Name unknown. Prime Minister during the reign of King Huai of Chu.
- Zhao Xian
- Prime Minister Zilan, son of King Huai of Chu. Name unknown.
- Lord Chunshen, Given name Huang Xie. Prime Minister during the reign of King Kaolie of Chu.
