= Queen Dowager Xuan =

Concubine of King Huiwen of Qin (c. 338 (or 344) - 265 BC)

- Born: 338 or 344 BC; State of Chu
- Died: 265 BC (aged 73 or 79)
- Burial: Mount Li
- Spouse: King Huiwen of Qin
- Issue: King Zhaoxiang of Qin; Prince Shi (公子市); Prince Li (公子悝); 2 sons with King of Yiqu
Posthumous name
- Queen Dowager Xuan (宣太后)

Queen Dowager Xuan of Qin (Chinese: 秦宣太后; personal name unknown (338 or 344 BC - 265 BC), also known as Mi Bazi (羋八子), was the first queen dowager in Chinese history. She was the concubine of King Huiwen of Qin, the mother of King Zhaoxiang of Qin, and the great-great-grandmother of Qin Shi Huang, the first emperor of China.

She acted as regent for her son 307-305 and held de facto power in Qin for 35 years during the Warring States period. She was also one of the first women confirmed to have acted as regent in China and one of the most politically influential women noted since Lady Nanzi.

== Early life ==
Lady Mi was born around 338 BCE (other sources say 344 BCE) into the royal family of the State of Chu. Because historical records do not explicitly name her father, historians generally believe she was not a direct daughter of the King of Chu, suggesting her early life was relatively minor within the court. Nonetheless, her ancestral name is Mǐ, the same as the royal house of Chu.

Around 329 BCE, a political marriage was arranged between the courts of Chu and Qin. A Chu princess was sent to marry Ying Si (King Huiwen of Qin). Lady Mi accompanied the princess as part of the bridal entourage, intended to serve as a secondary consort. This practice was common during the era to strengthen diplomatic ties and secure Chu's influence within the Qin court.

She held the rank 'bazi' in King Huiwen's harem, so she was also called Mi Bazi. The royal harem was at this time dominated by Queen Huiwen, whose son, Ying Dang, was the designated Crown Prince .

Despite her low rank, Mi Bazi gained sustained favor with King Huiwen and gave birth to at least three sons:

- Ying Ji (the future King Zhaoxiang of Qin)
- Ying Kui
- Ying Fei

King Huiwen died in 311 BC, succeeded by his son King Wu of Qin. King Wu suffered an accident and died without issue in 307 BC. With support from Zhao Gu, the prime minister of Dai (vassal of Zhao under King Wuling of Zhao), and maternal half-brother Wei Ran, Mi Bazi's son, Prince Ji, claimed the Qin throne as King Zhaoxiang. Mi Bazi became Queen Dowager and regent for King Zhaoxiang (who hadn't come of age), with assistance from Wei Ran.

== As the First Queen Dowager in Chinese History ==
Before Queen Dowager Xuan, there was no standard term for the mother of a reigning king who held power. A mother of a king could be termed Wang Mu. However, she decided to use the title Tai Hou. This term itself roughly translates to "Great Queen" and was a way of elevating her status above a regular Queen Mother or Queen Consort. This also signifies that she was the "head of the inner court" and, by extension, the state, especially since the emperor was a child at that time.

As Queen Dowager, she bestowed titles on her half-brothers, Wei Ran and Mi Rong, as well as her two other sons, Gongzi Fei and Gongzi Kui. These four, collectively known as "Four Nobles" would hold power over Qin for years.

Lady Mi represented Qin's interests and protected and expanded Qin's realm. However, she refused to fight her homeland Chu when the state of Han, under the attack of Chu, asked Qin for reinforcement.

She entered into an affair with the "barbarian" Yiqu king and had two sons with him. It is not known if this intent was a personal or political move. Nonetheless, after around 30 years (272 BCE), she tricked and killed King Yiqu. Their two sons were also killed. Following that coup, the Qin army marched into Yiqu territory at the Queen Dowager's orders; the Qin annihilated Yiqu and thus came to possess the Ordos region. Since there was no more hostile forces in the north of Qin, Yiqu's fall ensured Qin's successful expansion eastward and served as a catalyst to the reunification of China by Qin Shi Huang many years later.

== Later years and death ==
In 271 BC, Fan Ju (Fan Sui) warned King Zhaoxiang that the power controlled by the Queen Dowager and the "Four Nobles" threatened the king's rule. King Zhaoxiang then stripped Lady Mi of her power, exiled the "Four Nobles" from the capital, and appointed Fan Ju to be Chancellor of Qin in place of Wei Ran.. Despite having more political leverage, Lady Mi did not resist King Zhaoxiang's move to remove her power.

After losing her power, Lady Mi took on a lover, Wei Choufu (魏丑夫). Despite his name (魏丑夫) translating literally to "Wei the Ugly Man," he was actually quite handsome. Another suggestion of why he had the character 丑 was because he was born in the year of an ox, which is also the year of 丑. When Lady Mi was dying, she requested that he be buried with her, but she was persuaded against it by Minister Yong Rui. In 265 BC, Lady Mi died and was buried at Mount Li. Despite being the Queen Dowager, she was not buried alongside King Huiwen. After her death, she was posthumously named as Queen Dowager Xuan.

== In fiction and popular culture ==
- Portrayed by Ning Jing in The Qin Empire II: Alliance (2012) and The Qin Empire III (2017)
- Portrayed by Sun Li in The Legend of Mi Yue (2015)
