= The Qin Empire II: Alliance =

- Poster
- 大秦帝国之纵横
- Genre: Historical drama
- Developed by: Zhou Yaping; Jiao Yang
- Screenplay by: Zhang Jianwei
- Story by: Sun Haohui
- Directed by: Ding Hei; Bao Chengzhi
- Creative director: Ding Guoli
- Presented by: Hu Zhanfan; Duan Xiannian; Luo Ming; Ren Xianliang; Liu Bin; Ma Runsheng; Wang Guangqun; Zhang Xuguang
- Starring: Ning Jing; Fu Dalong; Yu Entai; Yao Lu; Fu Miao; Zhou Bo; Jing Hao; Li Li-chun; Yang Xinming; Chen Hao; Peng Bo; Yang Zhigang; Zheng Tianyong
- Ending theme: "Qin Culture Under Heaven" (天下秦风) by Tan Weiwei and Tan Jing
- Composers: Zhao Jiping; Zhao Lin
- Country of origin: China
- Original language: Mandarin
- No. of episodes: 51

Production
- Executive producers: Zhang Jie; Wang Hao; He Xiaoli
- Producers: Zhang Ziyang; Li Yuan
- Production location: China
- Cinematography: Zhang Chaoying
- Editor: Li Zimeng
- Running time: ≈45 minutes per episode
- Production company: Xi'an Qujiang Cultural Industry Investment

Original release
- Network: Astro Wah Lai Toi
- Release: 22 June 2012

Related
- The Qin Empire (2009); The Qin Empire III (2017); The Qin Empire IV (2019)

The Qin Empire II: Alliance (大秦帝国之纵横) is a 2012 Chinese historical television series based on Sun Haohui's novel of the same Chinese title, romanticising the events in China during the Warring States period primarily from the perspective of the Qin state during the reigns of King Huiwen and King Wu.

It was first aired on Astro Wah Lai Toi in Malaysia in 2012. It was preceded by The Qin Empire (2009) and followed by The Qin Empire III (2017), which were also based on Sun Haohui's novels. The series began streaming as Qin Empire: Alliance on Netflix in 2017.

== Synopsis ==
The series is set in the mid-fourth century BC during the Warring States period of China. In 338 BC, Ying Si (King Huiwen) succeeds his father, Ying Quliang (Duke Xiao), as the ruler of the Qin state. After coming to power, he gets rid of Shang Yang, whom he has a personal grudge against, but retains the sociopolitical reforms implemented by his father and Shang Yang in the past two decades.

Ying Si soon receives an invitation to attend a ceremony in Pengcheng, where he and the rulers of the Qi and Wei states will declare themselves kings and recognise each other's legitimacy. (The rulers of Qin and Qi were previously dukes.) He survives assassination attempts and prevents rival states from forming an alliance against Qin. While he is away, the Qin aristocrats who have long opposed Shang Yang's reforms instigate the Yiqu state to attack Xianyang, the Qin capital, and attempt to use the opportunity to overthrow the king. However, King Huiwen remains cool-headed while dealing with the crisis, and eventually drives back the Yiqu invaders and eliminates the traitorous aristocrats.

Under King Huiwen's reign, the Qin state defeats the Wei state and seizes all the Wei territories west of the Yellow River between 330 and 328 BC. In 330 BC, the Qin state takes advantage of internal conflict in the Yiqu state to attack them and force them to surrender by 327 BC. In 318 BC, the Qin army successfully repels an invasion by a five-state alliance – Wei, Zhao, Han, Yan and Chu. Two years later, Qin conquers the Shu state to its south. In 313 BC, King Huiwen sends his chancellor Zhang Yi to sow discord between the Chu and Qi states. When King Huai of Chu learns that he has been deceived, he orders an attack on Qin but loses at the Battle of Danyang. With these victories, the Qin state gains control over the Guanzhong, Hanzhong and Bashu regions, and poses an even greater threat to its rivals in the east.

King Huiwen dies in 311 BC. He is succeeded by his first son, Ying Dang (King Wu), who wages war against the Han state and gains access to the Zhou dynasty's capital, Luoyang, after the Battle of Yiyang. In 307 BC, while visiting the Zhou royal palace in Luoyang, King Wu attempts to powerlift a ding as a show of his physical strength. Although he succeeds in his attempt, he suffers a fatal injury and dies shortly afterwards. His younger half-brother, Ying Ji (King Zhaoxiang), will eventually succeed him as the next king of Qin.

== Cast ==
- Fu Dalong as Ying Si (King Huiwen of Qin)
- Yu Entai as Zhang Yi
- Ning Jing as Mi Bazi
- Zhou Bo as Ying Ji
- Fu Miao as Wei Shu (Queen Huiwen of Qin)
- Jing Hao as Ying Hua - a great warrior and general of Qin
- Yao Lu as Gongsun Yan (Wei strategist) - also known as Xi Shou
- Li Li-chun as King Hui of Wei
- Yang Xinming as Hui Shi
- Yang Zhigang as Mi Yuan
- Zheng Tianyong as Zhao Yang - Minister of Chu
- Peng Bo as King Huai of Chu
- Chen Hao as King of Yiqu - Yiqu Hai
- Sun Qiang as Gan Mao
- Sun Feihu as Gan Long
- Sun Ting as Bai Qi
- Zhang Zhenhua as Wei Ran
- He Ziming as Ying Dang (King Wu of Qin)
- Yang Fanghan as Su Xuan - an innkeeper in Xianyang
- Jiao Junxiang as Chen Zhen
- Liu Hui as Ying Zhuang
- Liu Zhaohong as Ying Ji
  - Yan Zhen as Ying Ji (child)
- Ren Zhengbin as Yi Wei
- Luo Dayou as Su Xuan's assistant - waiter
- Zhan Hewen as Xiang Wen
- Ding Jialan as Xiaomei
- Lu Jia as Feng Gao
- He Yunqing as Du Zhi
- Peng Zhidong as Ying Qian
- Zhou Zhengbo as Sima Cuo
- Gao Haicheng as Zhao Yi
- Sun Min as Qin deputy emissary
- Jiang Yiming as Jian Ping
- Wang Caiping as Zhang Yi's mother
- Zhang Yongsheng as Ying Xin
- Yan Yichang as Qin noble
- Zhao Yi as Wei Zhang
- Wang Deshun as Long Gu - General of Wei and friend of Xi Shou
- Zhang Bo as Wei Si (King Xiang of Wei)
- Xue Fei as Wei princess
- Yan Pei as Wei Xiu
- Wang Yunsheng as Wei Meng
- Wang Jiahao as Wei Gao
- Wang Junpeng as Wei He
- Wei Hua as Zilan
- Xiahou Bin as Jin Shang
- Wang Daqi as Jing Cui
- Zhao Bo as Jing Xuan
- Zhang Xuan as Zheng Xiu
- Yuan Fei as Xiang Meng
- Cheng Guodong as Qu Gai
- Wang Di as Ji Hu
- Guo Jiaming as Lord Zhaowen of Zhou
- Chen Xiao as Mi Yan - son of Mi Bazi and King of Yiqu
- Li Baocheng as Yiqu prince
- Wang Ning as Han Peng (Marquis Wu'an of Han)
- Ma Weijun as Han Kang (King Xuanhui of Han)
- Liao Dongli as Gongzhong Chi
- Liu Chang as Crown Prince Huan of Han
- He Yongsheng as King Wei of Qi
- Tian Xiaobing as Tian Ying
- Liu Lei as Lord Mengchang
- He Yunqing as Kuang Zhang
- Li Mingming as Crown Prince Ping of Yan
- Doudou as Zhen'er
- Liu Tianzuo as King Wuling of Zhao
- Guo Chao as Zhao Gu
- Wang Yunsheng as King of Wushi
- Zhu Jun as Zhuang Zhou
- Yuan Fei as woman from Ba

== Broadcasts ==
Region	Network	Dates	Notes
Malaysia	Astro Wah Lai Toi	22 June 2012 – ?	
South Korea	CHING	30 August 2012 – ?	
Taiwan	CTV	27 September – 29 October 2012	
Taiwan	GTV	13 November – 14 December 2012	
Mainland China	CCTV-1	5 September – 9 October 2013	
Japan	Channel Ginga	5 November 2013 – ?	
Singapore	Jia Le Channel	10 January – 13 March 2014	
Taiwan	Top TV	28 April – 28 May 2014	
Hong Kong	HKTV	2 May – 21 June 2015	
Thailand	Channel 9 MCOT HD	August 30, 2018 -	
