= Changqingqiao =

Changqingqiao may refer to any of the following places in China:

- Changqingqiao, Ningxian, a town in Gansu province
- Changqingqiao railway station, a railway station in Gansu province
- Changqingqiao station, a subway station of the Shengyang Metro
