= Bai Qi =

Chinese Qin state military general ( c. 332 BC – 257 BC)

Lord Wu'an Bai Qi
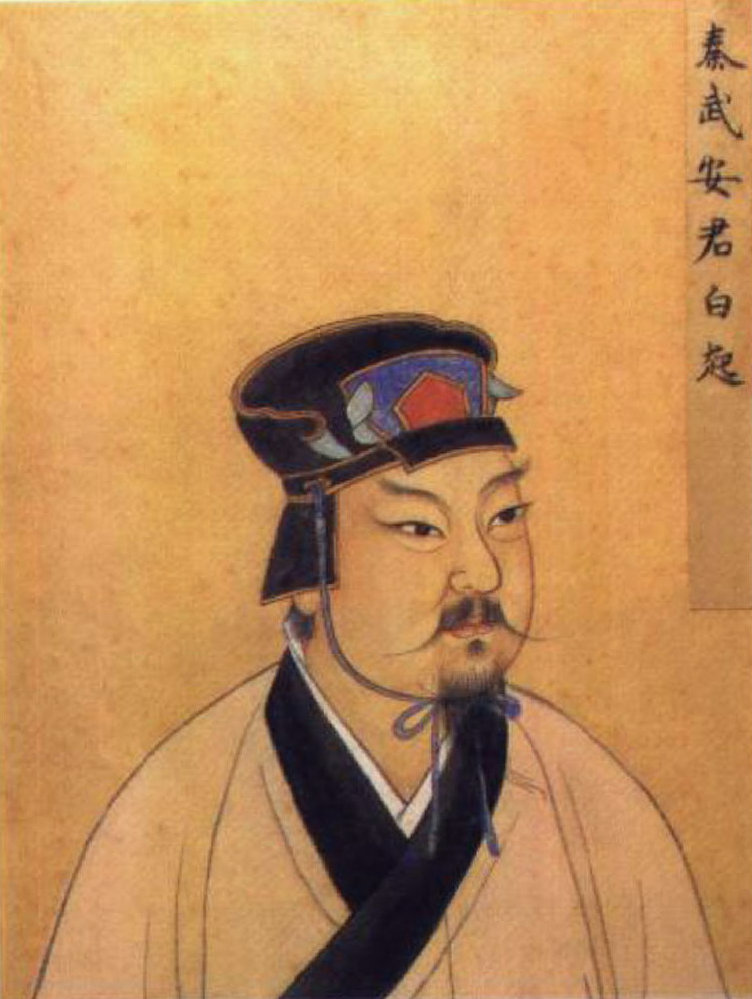
- Nickname: Ren Tu
- Born: c. 332 BC; Mei county
- Died: 257 BC Duyou
- Allegiance: Qin
- Rank: Senior General
- Conflicts: Battle of Yique; Battle of Yan and Ying; Battle of Huayang; Battle of Xingcheng; Battle of Changping

Bai Qi (Chinese: 白起; c. 332 – c. January 257 BC), also known as Bo Qi and Gongsun Qi (公孫起), was a Chinese military general of the Qin state during the Warring States period. Born in Mei (present-day Mei County, Shaanxi), Bai Qi served as the commander of the Qin army for more than 30 years, being responsible for the deaths of over one million, earning him the nickname Ren Tu (人屠; lit. 'human butcher'). According to the Shiji, he seized more than 73 cities from the other six hostile states, and to date no record has been found to show that he suffered a single defeat throughout his military career. He was instrumental in the rise of Qin as a military hegemon and the weakening of its rival states, thus enabling Qin's eventual conquest of them. He was regarded by the Thousand Character Classic as one of the four Greatest Generals of the Warring States period, along with Li Mu, Wang Jian, and Lian Po; he is also remembered as the most fearsome amongst the four.

== Ancestry ==
The New Book of Tang, Volume 75 Second Part, wrote that he was descended from a general of Duke Mu of Qin, Baiyi Bing (白乙丙) of the Jian lineage (蹇). Baiyi Bing himself was a son of Jian Shu (蹇叔), a Qin scholar-official with Song origins.

Though the poet Bai Juyi of the Tang dynasty wrote in his book Therefore, The Case of Bai Fujun, The Magistrate of Gong County (故巩县令白府君事状) that he was descended from Baigong Sheng (白公胜), of the Bai lineage of the Mi clan (羋), grandson of King Ping of Chu, the rebellious prince in the reign of King Hui of Chu.

== Life ==
In 293 BC, Bai Qi led the Qin army to victory against Wei (魏) and Han (韓) forces at the Battle of Yique (in present-day Longmen (龍門), southeast of Luoyang, Henan), reportedly slaughtering around 240,000 enemy soldiers in total while capturing some cities.

In 292 BC, he was promoted from Zuo Shu Zhang (左庶長; Vice Prime Minister of Qin) to Da Liang Zao (大良造; Commander of the Officers, before 328 BC also Prime Minister of Qin) by King Zhaoxiang of Qin.

In 278 BC, he led the Qin army to capture Ying (郢), the capital city of Chu, in the process seizing considerable amounts of territory. As a reward, he was given the title Lord Wu'an (武安君; literally: Lord of Martial Peace). Reportedly drowning 100,000 people in a flood attack.

In 273 BC, the Qin army under his command defeated the joint armies of Zhao (趙) and Wei at Huayang (華陽; south of present-day Zhengzhou (鄭州), Henan), where he massacred the submitting soldiers, reportedly numbering around 150,000 troops in total: 130,000 Wei soldiers with a further 20,000 Zhao soldiers being killed and thrown into a river.

In 264 BC, he successfully besieged 5 Han fortresses and thereafter decapitated the 50,000 enemy soldiers.

Sometime before 262 BC, after the split of alliance between Qi state and Wei state, Bai Qi was sent by the new king of Qin to lead 200,000 men to attack Han, where they met the opposition forces of Han and Wei states of 300,000 men. Bai Qi managed to capture Yowang, and disrupt connection between Shandong and the capital of Han.

During the Battle of Changping in 260 BC, after Qin intelligence reported that the Zhao army was commanded by the inexperienced Zhao Kuo, who had replaced the experienced Lian Po as acting commander, Bai Qi was appointed to succeed Wang He as commander of the Qin army and was promoted to Shang Jiangjun (上將軍, lit. 'Senior General'). The Zhao army was split into two parts and its supply lines and retreat route cut off by Bai Qi. More than 400,000 Zhao soldiers, including the Shangdang people who surrendered after Zhao Kuo was shot dead by Qin crossbowmen, were slain (坑殺; buried alive) on the orders of Bai Qi.

Bai Qi wanted to end Zhao once and for all, as they were weary and psychologically affected by the losses incurred from the Battle of Changping, but the prime minister of Qin, Fan Ju (范雎), who was persuaded by a talker from Zhao, feared Bai Qi's rising power, and recommended that the king stop the attack on the pretext that the Qin troops ought to be rested, and to accept a ceded territory negotiation. Bai Qi stopped the attack; on his return journey to the State of Qin, he fell ill.

According to the Shiji, in the year 257 BC, Qin started to besiege Handan, the capital of Zhao. Because Bai Qi was ill, the Qin king used another prominent general, Wang Ling (王陵), who subsequently lost the battle. After about four months, when Bai Qi seemed to have recovered, the king asked him to return to his post as commander, but Bai Qi held a different opinion, he argued that Qin no longer had enough resources for such a long-range war, and the other states would soon attack Qin since Qin had been contrary to the negotiation. However, the king insisted on continuing the attack. Bai Qi refused the king's command, using his illness as an excuse. The king, therefore, had to use Wang He (王齕), another prominent Qin general, instead of Bai Qi, as the commander.

This decision did not help the Qin army in the battle at all; Chu and Wei soon sent troops to assist Zhao. After more than five months of continuous defeat at Handan, Qin had suffered major losses. The king asked Bai Qi to become commander again, but he once more used his illness to refuse the request. In the Zhan Guo Ce, his true intentions were supposedly revealed when he stated that he would rather be executed for refusing the king's order, than lose his long undefeated fame on the battlefield. Having been refused several times, the king became angry, removed all titles from Bai Qi, and forced him to leave Xianyang, the Qin capital. In addition, Fan Ju persuaded the king that Bai Qi would join another state as a general and become a threat to the State of Qin. Convinced by Fan Ju's information, the king then forced Bai Qi to commit suicide in Duyou (杜郵). Before he committed suicide, Bai Qi stated that he deserved such a tragic ending after having killed so many people.

== Legacy ==
Bai Qi sometimes appears as a door god on Chinese and Taoist temples, usually paired with Li Mu.

He is noted in Chinese history as a symbol of brutality rather than for his military talent. The traditional Tofu dish of Gaoping, today's Changping, called Bai Qi meat, is well known. Some stories have been written about Bai Qi suffering for his brutal actions, such as one mentioned in the Chronicles of the Eastern Zhou Kingdoms, which says that an ox with two Chinese characters, 'Bai Qi', tattooed on its back, was executed by lightning during the Tang dynasty.

Human remains used to and still continue to be found at the site of the Battle of Changping around Gaoping. The Emperor Xuanzong of Tang once decided to dedicate a temple over a collection of the remains there.

== In popular culture ==
- Bai Qi is played by Sun Ting in the 2012 television series The Qin Empire II: Alliance and by Xing Jiadong in its 2017 sequel The Qin Empire III.
- Bai Qi is played by Zeng Hongchang (曾虹畅) in the 2015 TV series The Legend of Mi Yue. His younger portrayals are played by Yang Yanduo (杨砚铎) (9-year-old Bai Qi) and Qiu Muyuan (裘慕遠) (15-year-old Bai Qi).
- Bai Qi, also known by the Japanese reading of his name, "Haku Ki", was the leader of the former generation of the "Qin Six Great Generals" in the manga series Kingdom. He was one of the best tacticians of his era and one of the most feared Generals in China, he personally led the infamous Battle of Changping, and under his cold gaze, executed and buried alive 450,000 Zhao soldiers.
- Bai Qi is one of the 32 historical figures who appear as special characters in the video game Romance of the Three Kingdoms XI by Koei. He has the highest military leadership statistics of all the characters, tied only to Han Xin.

== See also ==
- King Zhaoxiang of Qin
- Lament for Ying
- Li Mu
- Lian Po
- Records of the Grand Historian
- Sima Qian
- Wang Jian
- Zhao Kuo
