= Ningxian =

Ningxian may refer to:

- Ningbo, formerly also known as Ningxian, city in Zhejiang, China
- Ning County, pinyin Ningxian, county in Gansu, China
