= Zheng Yajun =

Chinese politician

- 郑亚军

Communist Party Secretary of Pingliang
- In office March 2016 – May 2017
- Preceded by: Chen Wei
- Succeeded by: Guo Chenglu

Communist Party Secretary of Jiayuguan
- In office August 2011 – March 2016
- Preceded by: Ma Guangming
- Succeeded by: Liu Peng

Mayor of Jiayuguan
- In office January 2009 – September 2011
- Preceded by: Ma Guangming
- Succeeded by: Liu Peng

Personal details
- Born: October 1961 (age 64–65) Ning County, Gansu, China
- Party: Chinese Communist Party
- Education: Lanzhou University of Arts and Science; Lanzhou University; Central Party School of the Chinese Communist Party

Chinese name
- Simplified Chinese: 郑亚军
- Traditional Chinese: 鄭亞軍
Transcriptions
Standard Mandarin
- Hanyu Pinyin: Zhèng Yàjūn

Zheng Yajun (Chinese: 郑亚军; born October 1961) is a former Chinese politician who spent his entire career in northwest China's Gansu province. He was investigated by China's top anti-graft agency in September 2021. Previously he served as deputy chairperson of the Environmental Resources Protection Committee of Gansu People's Congress and before that party secretary of Pingliang, and party secretary and mayor of Jiayuguan.

== Biography ==
Zheng was born in Ning County, Gansu, in October 1961. From September 1979 to September 1980, he was a coal-mine worker. In September 1980, he was accepted to Gansu Education College (now Lanzhou University of Arts and Science), where he majored in Chinese.

After university in 1982, he worked in government. He joined the Chinese Communist Party (CCP) in June 1985. He spent 12 years working at the Organization Department of CCP Gansu Provincial Committee before serving as deputy director of the General Office of CCP Lanzhou Municipal Committee in December 1996. In August 2001, he was dispatched to the General Office of CCP Gansu Provincial Committee, and was reassigned to the General Office of Gansu Provincial People's Government in August 2001. In November 2002, he became deputy party secretary of Jiayuguan, rising to party secretary in August 2011. He concurrently served as mayor of Jiayuguan from January 2009 to September 2011. In March 2016, he became party secretary of Pingliang, serving in the post until May 2017, when he was appointed deputy chairperson of the Environmental Resources Protection Committee of Gansu People's Congress.

=== Downfall ===
On 2 February 2021, he was put under investigation for alleged "serious violations of discipline and laws" by the Central Commission for Discipline Inspection (CCDI), the party's internal disciplinary body, and the National Supervisory Commission, the highest anti-corruption agency of China. He was detained for suspected bribe taking on July 20. On September 12, he was indicted on suspicion of accepting bribes.

Government offices
Preceded by Ma Guangming	Mayor of Jiayuguan; 2009–2011	Succeeded by Liu Peng
Party political offices
Preceded by Ma Guangming	Communist Party Secretary of Jiayuguan; 2011–2016	Succeeded by Liu Peng
Preceded by Chen Wei	Communist Party Secretary of Pingliang; 2016–2017	Succeeded by Guo Chenglu
