= Changqingqiao railway station =

Railway station in Qingyang, China

Changqingqiao 长庆桥

General information
- Location: Changqingqiao Village, Changqingqiao town, Ning County, Qingyang, Gansu Province; China
- Operator: Lanzhou Railway Bureau
- Tracks: 18

Other information
- Station code: 39463 (TMIS); CQJ (Telegraph code); CQQ (Pinyin code)

Changqingqiao railway station is a railway station located in Changqing District, Lanzhou, China. It is part of the Lanzhou–Chongqing railway. It is one of the three major railway stations in Qingyang City, especially as a freight station. Freight and passenger service started in 2015. The station is served by passenger service several times a day as a terminus of routes to Pingliang railway station of Pingliang City and Lanzhou railway station.
