= Yiqu =

Ancient Chinese state

Yiqu 義渠 Old Chinese (444 BCE): *ŋaih-ga
- c. 720 BC–272 BC
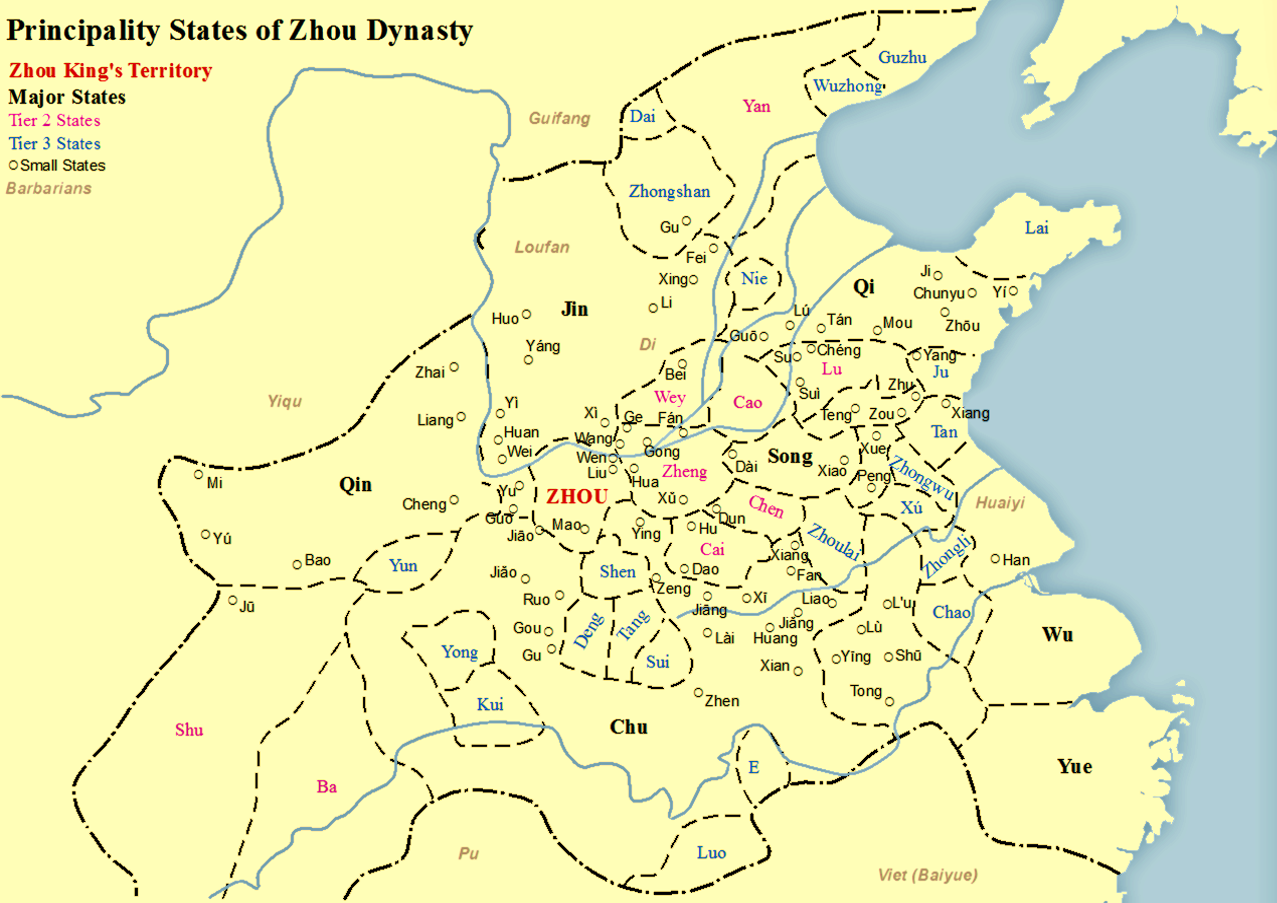
- The Yiqu state was located north-west of Qin during the Eastern Zhou period
- Capital: (located in present day Ning County, Gansu)
- Government: Monarchy
- Historical era: Zhou dynasty
  - Establishment of the state of Yiqu: c. 720 BC
  - Annexed by Qin: 272 BC

Yiqu (simplified Chinese: 义渠; traditional Chinese: 義渠; pinyin: Yìqú; Wade–Giles: I-ch'ü; Old Chinese (444 BCE): *ŋaih-ga > Eastern Han Chinese: *ŋɨɑiᴴ-gɨɑ, or simplified Chinese: 仪渠; traditional Chinese: 儀渠; pinyin: Yíqú), was an ancient Chinese state which existed in the Hetao region and what is now Ningxia, eastern Gansu and northern Shaanxi during the Zhou dynasty, and was a centuries-long western rival of the state of Qin. It was inhabited by a semi-sinicized people called the Rong of Yiqu (Chinese: 義渠之戎), who were regarded as a branch of western Rong people by contemporary writers, whom modern scholars have attempted to identify as one of the ancestors of the minority people in Northwest China.

== History ==
Contemporary textual evidence for the Yiqu is sparse, beginning only with the foundation of the state of Yiqu in the late eighth century BCE. It lasted approximately four-and-a-half centuries, until its end in the early third century. However, the origins of the Yiqu people as descendants of other "non-Huaxia" Chinese peoples have been traced back to the time of the Shang dynasty on the basis of textual scholarship and archaeological evidence, although this remains controversial (see "Ethnic identity of the Yiqu").

=== Spring and Autumn period ===
Around 720 BC, the Yiqu Rong migrated eastwards. Indeed, this is the first mention of Yiqu in textual sources. At this time, the Zhou kings have been weakened by war and natural disasters. In 770 BC, Ping, King of Zhou moved the capital east to Chengzhou in present-day Luoyang, Henan, and the weakened royal authority spelled the dawn of the Spring and Autumn period.

According to The Treatise on the Western Qiang in the Book of the Later Han, "During the late reign of King Ping, Zhou was undergoing decline. The Rong harried the many Xia from Mount Long to the east. Up until the Yi and Luo Rivers, the Rong were everywhere. Thereupon, there were for the first time Di, Huan, Kai, and Ji Rong in the Wei River valley, there was the Yiqu Rong in [the lands] north of the Jing River, and there were the Dali Rong in Luochuan." (Note: 及平王之末，周遂陵遲，戎逼諸夏，自隴山以東，及乎伊、洛，往往有戎。於是渭首有狄、铠、邽、冀之戎，涇北有義渠之戎，洛川有大荔之戎。) King Ping died in 720 BC, which means that the state of Yiqu was founded no earlier than that year. From this source it is clear that the Yiqu were considered one of the peoples called "Rong", a kind of warlike foreigner. For the remainder of the Spring and Autumn period, contemporary sources are silent on Yiqu.

=== Warring States period ===
During the Warring States period, the Yiqu came under threat as Qin began its expansion. The central region of Qin was the Wei River valley, which was not far south from the Yiqu settlements in the Jing River valley. From approximately 460 BC, Qin and other states attacked the other Rong peoples who lived in the Central Plain, until the Yiqu were the only Rong people left. (Note: 至周貞王八年，秦厲公滅大荔，取其地。趙亦滅代戎，即北戎也。韓、魏復共稍并伊、洛、陰戎，滅之。其遺脫者皆逃走，西踰汧、隴。自是中國無戎寇，唯餘義渠種焉。) Until that time, the Yiqu and other Rong had occasionally pillaged Qin cities, but no large-scale hostilities had broken out.

The Yiqu first attacked and defeated Qin in the mid fourth century. Qin followed this with an attack four years later when Yiqu was in turmoil. Yiqu then submitted to Qin and became its vassal in 327 BC. Qin set up a county in its territory. However, the Yiqu were never subservient to Qin, and the two sides continued to do battle. Qin attacked soon later, taking the city of Yuzhi. Although Yiqu beat Qin at Libo two years later in 318 BC, it suffered a heavy defeat soon after: Yiqu ceded twenty-five cities to Qin in 315 BC, during the reign of King Hui of Qin. (Note: 十年...伐取義渠二十五城。) (Note: 秦本紀：義渠敗秦師于洛。後四年，義渠國亂，秦惠王遣庶長操將兵定之，義渠遂臣於秦。後八年，秦伐義渠，取郁郅。後二年，義渠敗秦師于李伯。明年，秦伐義渠，取徒涇二十五城。)

However, approximately forty years intervened before the final destruction of Yiqu. In 311 BC, a few years after Qin took twenty-five cities from Yiqu, King Hui died. His son became King Wu of Qin, who attacked the Yiqu in the second year of his reign. However, he died just three years later, in 307 BC. It was not until the late reign of King Zhao of Qin that the Yiqu were destroyed. Historians have analysed this as part of a power struggle in the Qin court, with the Queen Dowager on one side, and the King on the other. When King Zhao came to power, he was but a boy, so his mother, Queen Dowager Xuan, served as regent. However, though the King grew older, the Queen Dowager kept control. She had the support of a powerful minister and three generals inside the court, and the support of the Yiqu King outside it. The Queen's need for a backup force against her son may be why the Yiqu were spared for a while.

In the end, Qin plotted to trap and kill the Yiqu King, and sent troops to launch a surprise attack to destroy Yiqu. The Treatise on the Western Qiang says, "When King Zhao of Qin came to the throne, the Yiqu King had an audience with him in Qin. Consequently, the Yiqu King had relations with his mother, the Queen Dowager Xuan, who bore him two sons. In the 43rd year of the reign of King Nan of Zhou [272 BC/271 BC], the Queen Dowager Xuan trapped and killed the Yiqu King in the Ganquan Palace. [Qin] raised troops and exterminated the Yiqu kingdom, and established Longxi, Beidi, and Shang commanderies [in their former lands]." (Note: 及昭王立，義渠王朝秦，遂與昭王母宣太后通，生二子。至王赧四十三年，宣太后誘殺義渠王於甘泉宮，因起兵滅之，始置隴西、北地、上郡焉。) The attribution of the Yiqu King's murder to the Queen Dowager may be a way to disguise the fact that it was actually King Zhao who had him killed. Indeed, King Zhao could personally take power after the removal of his mother's military support, and banished the Queen Dowager and her supporters from the state. (Note: 范睢蔡澤列傳：昭王至，聞其與宦者爭言，遂延迎，謝曰：「寡人宜以身受命久矣，會義渠之事急，寡人旦暮自請太后。」...於是廢太后，逐穰侯、高陵、華陽、涇陽君於關外。)

After Qin destroyed Yiqu, it established commanderies and set up counties in the Yiqu territories, and the Yiqu Rong became subjects of Qin. Qin then built "long walls" to protect against other peoples in these new territories.

=== Aftermath ===
During the Western Han, there were still references to "Yiqu" but these were in the general sense of "barbarian", not in specific reference to the people of the former state of Yiqu. Some members of the Yiqu people took Yiqu as their clan name. Others, descending from Yiqu nobility, took Gongsun (Chinese: 公孫; pinyin: gōng sūn; lit. 'noble grandson') as their clan names, and became generals. Aside from these fleeting references, the Yiqu disappear from the historical records during the Han dynasty.

== Geography ==
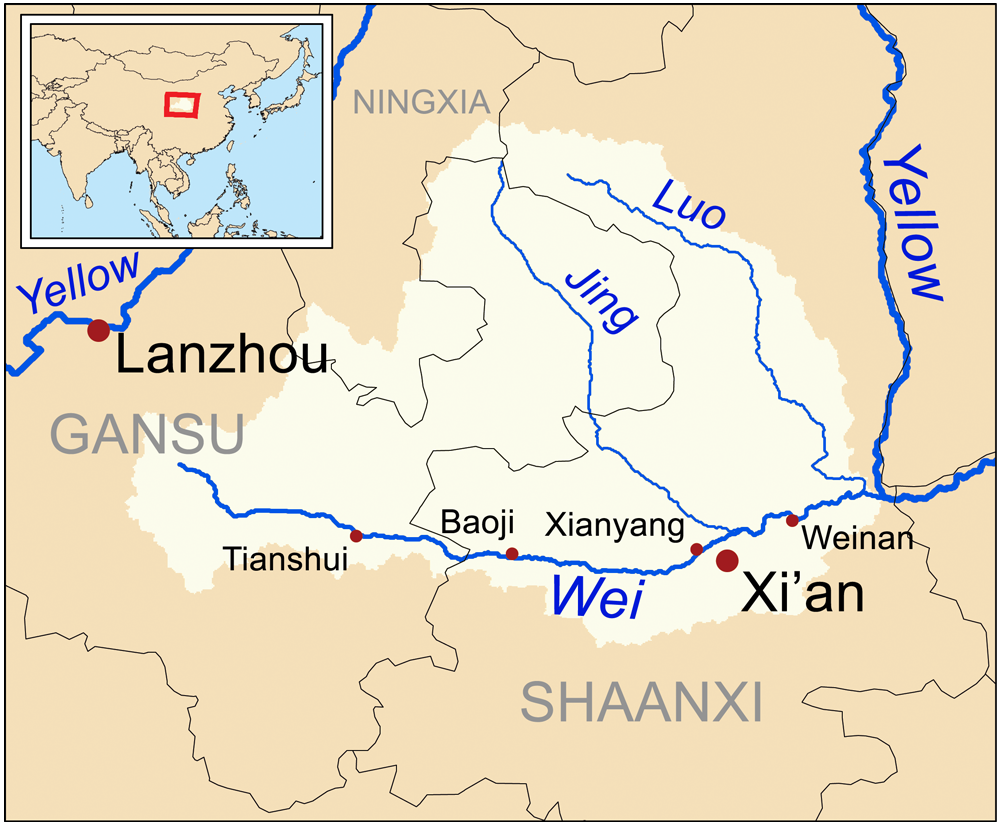
The Wei, Jing, and Luo rivers. The Xianyun, ancestors of the Yiqu, lived in the upper reaches of the Jing and Luo rivers.

The capital of Yiqu has been identified as lying in Miaojuping (Chinese: 庙咀坪; pinyin: miáo jǔ píng) in Ning County, Qingyang, Gansu, on the confluence of four rivers. Archaeologists have discovered the remains of city walls and artefacts dating from the Zhou to Han dynasties. Textual evidence suggests it was abandoned before the Northern Wei period, when it was destroyed.

It is not known exactly how many cities the Yiqu built in their lands; from the number of cities cited which were taken by Qin according to historical texts, they may have numbered over twenty.

== Culture ==
Not much is known about the culture of the Yiqu, other than they practised levirate marriages (including stepmothers) and cremated their deceased. The fact that the Yiqu leader is called "king" (Chinese: 王; pinyin: wáng) suggests a degree of political sophistication above a tribal chief. What is more likely is that they were an agricultural people, or at least had a mixed agricultural/pastoral economy. The fact that they were settled in established city-states indicates that they must have had significant agriculture to support themselves. This sets the Yiqu apart from the nomadic "non-Huaxia" peoples of East Asia such as the Xiongnu, who were either truly nomadic herders or migrated around in a transhumance fashion. Moreover, the fact that pottery objects and bricks (possibly used to build a palace) were discovered at the remains of the Yiqu capital further suggests a developed urban culture. The similarities of the type of bricks here and those excavated from remains of cities in other states of Zhou (such as Wei, Qi and Chu) may suggest a degree of trade between Yiqu and its neighbours.

== Ethnic identity ==
In the pre-Han era, nomadic agriculturalists and pastoralists were considered alien peoples, whose history can be only tentatively traced through written sources and archaeological finds. Written sources identify the Yiqu a part of the Rong as the "Yiqu Rong" (Chinese: 義渠之戎; pinyin: yìqú zhī róng). (Note: 及平王之末，周遂陵遲，戎逼諸夏，自隴山以東，及乎伊、洛，往往有戎...涇北有義渠之戎。) However, it cannot be said for certain that the Yiqu were a "Rong" people, or that there was a common "Rong" identity. Scholarly consensus has it that "Rong" was used ambiguously in Chinese sources as a blanket term for the various alien peoples around the Zhou territories, with no particular ethnic connotation.

If the Yiqu Rong are to be tentatively identified with any other "Rong" people, it would be the "Quan Rong" (also named "Xunyu" or "Xianyun"). This people attacked Zhou during the reign of Gugong Danfu (mid 12th century BCE), forcing the Zhou out of the city-state of Bin in the Jing River basin, which is where Yiqu established a state in the late eighth century. In addition, at the end of Western Zhou (781 BC–771 BC) the Quan Rong launched a series of attacks and invaded the Zhou capital, which weakened royal power and contributed to the moving of the Zhou capital to the east. As mentioned above, the Yiqu first appear as one of the many "Rong" which moved into the Central Plain around 720, settling in territory nominally controlled by the Zhou king. After this development, references to Xianyun, Xunyu, and Qian Rong in the Jing River basin are supplanted by "Yiqu" or "Yiqu Rong".

Furthermore, the Xianyun may be linked to the Siwa culture in the Tao River basin in what is now eastern Gansu, which dates to approximately the 14th century BCE, which some scholars believe is the remains of a Di branch of the Qiang. Indeed, the word "Yiqu" borrowed into ancient Chinese with the characters "義渠" (Old Chinese (444 BCE): */ŋaih-ga/) may be an Old Qiang toponym meaning "Four Waters", which corresponds to the four rivers which meet at the old Yiqu capital at present-day Miaojuping. However, evidence for this is based on alleged correspondence between the unattested Old Qiang language and Amdo Tibetan, (Note: It is alleged that modern Chinese "yìqú" corresponds to Amdo Tibetan "བཞི་ཆུ" (Tibetan: བཞི་ཆུ, Lhasa dialect: [bʒi tsʰu]).) which is spoken in southern Gansu, and the assumption of a close relationship between these Tibetan speakers and the ancient Qiang and Rong, which cannot be firmly verified.

Sinologist Edwin Pulleyblank argued that the Xiongnu who later established the first nomadic empire on the Eurasian steppe were part of the Yiqu people, before the Qin general Meng Tian drove them north out of the Ordos region in 215 BC.
