= Lingyin =

Lingyin may refer to:

- Lingyin Temple, Buddhist temple in Hangzhou, Zhejiang, China
- Prime minister (Chu State), or lingyin, prime minister or chancellor of ancient Chinese state of Chu
