= Dou Yuejiao =

Lingyin of Chu

Dou Yuejiao
- Chinese: 鬭越椒
Transcriptions
Standard Mandarin
- Hanyu Pinyin: Dòu Yuèjiāo

Dou Yuejiao, ancestral name Mi, clan name Ruo'ao, was a Chu politician and aristocrat during 7th century BCE. He was best known for being the initiator of the Ruo'ao Rebellion, a rebellion of the Ruo'ao clan against King Zhuang of Chu.

== Life ==
Yuejiao was the son of Dou Ziliang (鬭子良) and the nephew of Dou Gouwutu (鬭榖於菟). His family was a cadet branch of Chu's ruling house Mi-Xiong. The Ruo'ao clan consisted of Dou and Cheng, descended from viscount Ruo'ao of Chu.

When Yuejiao was young, he was said to be resented by his uncle Gouwutu. Gouwutu, according to the Zuo Zhuan, described him as a "wolf poppy with a savage heart"(狼子野心) and believed that Yuejiao would bring disaster to the Ruo'ao clan. Viscount Xuan of Zhao, a retainer of Jin, also had a negative view on the Ruo'ao clan led by Yuejiao.

King Zhuang of Chu succeeded Chu's throne at a young age; Cheng Jia (成嘉) of the Ruo'ao clan was the Lingyin of Chu. The king found himself devoid of any real political influence over his state. After Cheng Jia's death, King Zhuang promoted Wei Jia (蔿賈) to the post of Lingyin, weakening Ruo'ao power. Wei Jia was explicitly hostile to the Ruo'ao clan. Under his advice, the King executed prime minister Dou Ban. Although King Zhuang soon appointed Yuejiao as the successor of Ban, Wei Jia was given the post of Sima, the supreme military commander of Chu. This arrangement of power intensified the hostilities between the Ruo'ao and Wei clan.

Since Wei Jia and King Zhuang had become imminent threats to the Ruo'ao clan, Yuejiao reacted by imprisoning Wei Jia in Liaoyang (modern-day Nanyang, Henan province) and killing him. He then organized his troops in Zhengye (modern-day Xinye) and openly started an armed rebellion against King Zhuang of Chu in 605 BCE.

The rebellion was initially successful and King Zhuang had requested a truce, offering the sons of three former Chu kings as hostages. However, Yuejiao rejected the king's proposal and fought him at the battle of Gaohu (modern-day Xiangyang). The battle turned out to be a victory for King Zhuang, in which Yuejiao was killed.

After the rebellion was put down, the majority of Ruo'ao clansmen were executed by King Zhuang. Only Dou Kehuang, the son of Yuejiao's cousin Dou Ban, was forgiven. The fall of the Ruo'ao clan were still mentioned more than 17 centuries later by Sima Guang in his work Zizhi Tongjian.

Even long after the death of Dou Yuejiao, the remaining members of the Ruo'ao clan were severely discriminated against in Chu. In 530 BCE, more than seventy years after the Ruo'ao Rebellion, King Ling of Chu executed Cheng Hu (成虎) due to the fact that he was a Ruo'ao.

Yuejiao's son Dou Benhuang (鬭贲皇) fled to the state of Jin and would later avenge his father's death in the Battle of Yanling.
