= King Sheng of Chu =

King of Chinese state of Chu from 407 to 402 BC

King Sheng of Chu 楚聲王

King of Chu
- Reign: 407–402 BC
- Predecessor: King Jian
- Successor: King Dao
- Died: 402 BC
- Spouse: Wuxu (無卹)
- Issue: King Dao
Names
- Ancestral name: Mǐ (羋); Lineage name: Xióng (熊); Given name: Dāng (當)
Posthumous name
- King Sheng (聲王) or King Shenghuan (聲桓王)
- House: Mi
- Dynasty: Chu
- Father: King Jian

King Sheng of Chu (Chinese: 楚聲王; pinyin: Chǔ Shēng Wáng), personal name Xiong Dang, was the king of the Chu state from 407 BC to 402 BC.

King Sheng succeeded his father, King Jian, who died in 408 BC. After a reign of six years, King Sheng was killed by bandits; his son, King Dao, succeeded him to the throne.

King Sheng of Chu House of Mi Died: 402 BC
Regnal titles
Preceded by King Jian of Chu	King of Chu; 407–402 BC	Succeeded by King Dao of Chu
