= King Su of Chu =

King of Chinese state of Chu from 380 to 370 BC

King Su of Chu 楚肅王

King of Chu
- Reign: 380–370 BC
- Predecessor: King Dao
- Successor: King Xuan
Names
- Ancestral name: Mǐ (羋); Lineage name: Xióng (熊); Given name: Zāng (臧)
Posthumous name
- King Su (肅王)
- House: Mi
- Dynasty: Chu
- Father: King Dao

King Su of Chu (Chinese: 楚肅王; pinyin: Chǔ Sù Wáng), personal name Xiong Zang, was the monarch of the Chu state from 380 BC to 370 BC. King Su succeeded his father King Dao, who was killed by bandits in 381 BC.

Upon his accession to Chu's throne, King Su executed more than seventy families who had participated in the murder of Wu Qi and the insulting of King Dao's corpse. However, he also abolished Wu Qi's reformist policies.

During his reign, Chu fought with the Han and Wei states. In 375 BC, Han conquered the Zheng state which had been in alliance with Chu for centuries.

King Su died in 370 BC after 11 years of reign. Since he had no sons, his younger brother, King Xuan, became the next ruler.

King Su of Chu House of Mi Died: 370 BC
Regnal titles
Preceded by King Dao of Chu	King of Chu; 380–370 BC	Succeeded by King Xuan of Chu
