= King Jian of Chu =

King of Chinese state of Chu from 431 to 408 BC

King Jian of Chu 楚簡王

King of Chu
- Reign: 431–408 BC
- Predecessor: King Hui
- Successor: King Sheng
- Died: 408 BC
- Issue: King Sheng
Names
- Ancestral name: Mǐ (羋); Lineage name: Xióng (熊); Given name: Zhōng (中)
Posthumous name
- King Jian (簡王 or 柬王)
- House: Mi
- Dynasty: Chu
- Father: King Hui

King Jian of Chu (Chinese: 楚簡王; pinyin: Chǔ Jiǎn Wáng), personal name Xiong Zhong, was from 431 BC to 408 BC the king of the Chu state.

King Jian succeeded his father, King Hui, to the Chu throne. He reigned for 24 years and was succeeded by his son, King Sheng.

King Jian of Chu House of Mi Died: 408 BC
Regnal titles
Preceded by King Hui of Chu	King of Chu; 431–408 BC	Succeeded by King Sheng of Chu
