= Garden Expo Park station =

Beijing Subway station

Garden Expo Park 园博园
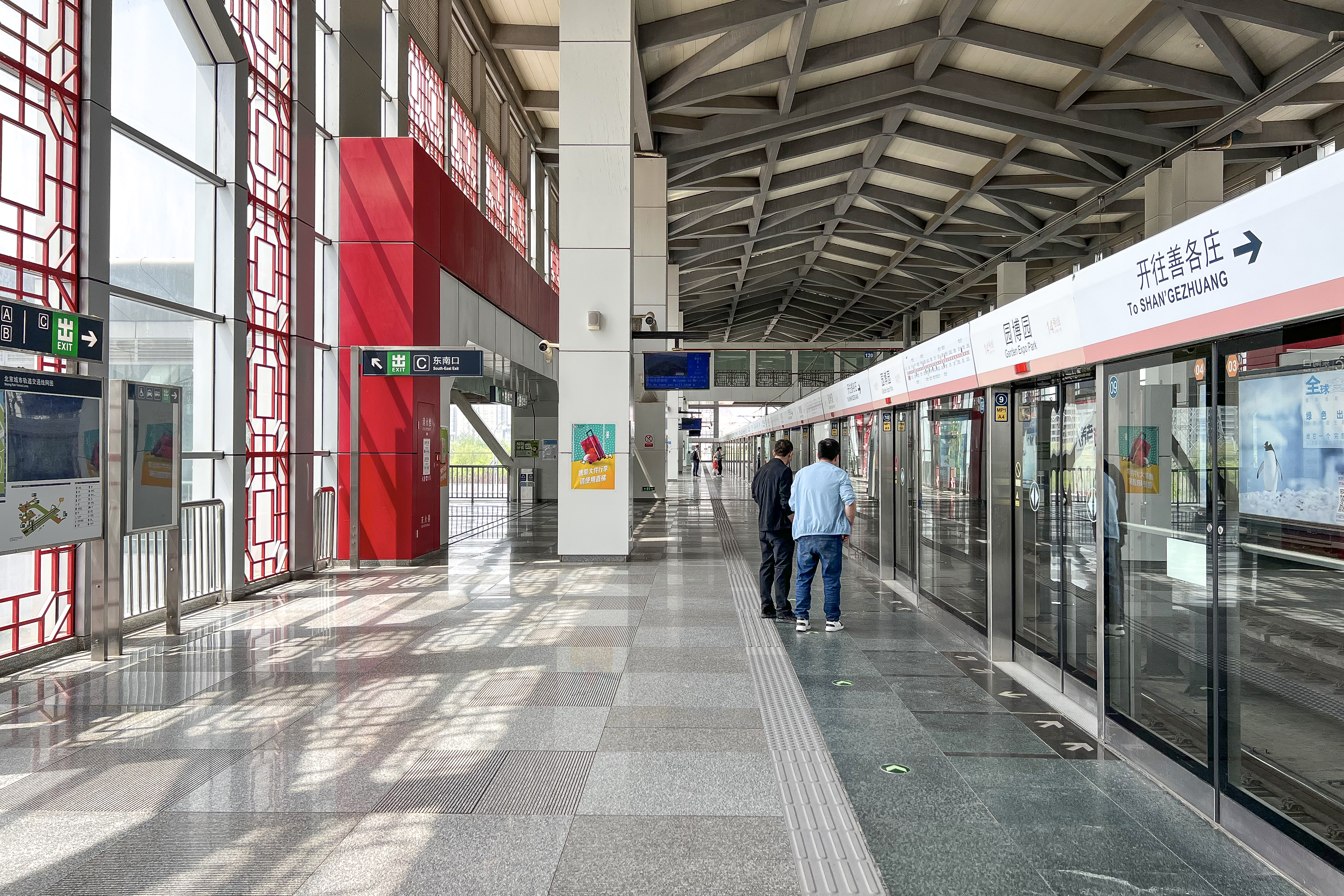
- Eastbound platform

General information
- Location: Yuanboyuan South Road (园博园南路) and Yuanbo Avenue (园博大道); Wanping Subdistrict, Fengtai District, Beijing; China
- Coordinates: 39°51′41″N 116°12′06″E
- Operator: Beijing MTR Corporation Limited
- Line: Line 14
- Platforms: 2 (2 side platforms)
- Tracks: 2

Construction
- Structure type: Elevated
- Accessible: Yes

History
- Opened: May 5, 2013

Services
Preceding station	Beijing Subway	Following station
Zhangguozhuang Terminus	Line 14	Dawayao towards Shangezhuang
Location
- Location within Beijing

Garden Expo Park station (simplified Chinese: 园博园站; traditional Chinese: 園博園站; pinyin: Yuánbóyuán zhàn) is a station on Line 14 of the Beijing Subway. It opened on May 5, 2013.

== Station layout ==
The station has 2 elevated side platforms.

== Exits ==
There are 4 exits, lettered A, B1, B2, and C. Exits A, B2, and C are accessible.

== See also ==
- Beijing Garden Expo Park
