= Battle of Yique =

Battle in 293 BC

Date	293 BC
Location	Yique, Henan 34°33′20″N 112°28′11″E
Result	Qin victory

Belligerents
Qin (State)	Wei (State); Han (State)

Commanders and leaders
Bai Qi	Gongsun Xi

Strength
120,000	240,000

Casualties and losses
7,800–8,500	240,000
- Location within China

The Battle of Yique (伊阙之战; 伊闕之戰) of 293 BC, fought by King Zhaoxiang of Qin against the alliance of Wei (魏) and Han (韩; 韓) at Yique (now known as Longmen, city of Luoyang, Henan province). The Qin commander was general Bai Qi. With half of the alliance force, Bai Qi's army took the alliance's strongholds one by one. The battle ended with the capture of the alliance general Gongsun Xi (公孙喜), 240,000 casualties on the alliance side, and the capture of five Han and Wei cities including Yique. After the battle, Han and Wei were forced to cede their lands to ensure further peace.

== Background ==
By 294 BC, the kingdom of Qin had become a major military power in China. Its first step of conquest began with the nearby kingdoms of Wei and Han.

Wei and Han had been enemies for many years, and did not pay much attention to Qin. In 294 BC Qin, under General Bai Qi, attacked Han and took an important fortress. Wei and Han realized the might of Qin, and joined forces to stop Qin from further conquests.

In 294 BC, Wei and Han gathered 240,000 troops to face Qin. The battleground was a vast area including five fortresses, cities, and defensive positions along rivers and mountain ranges. Bai Qi only had 120,000 men under his command. But the alliance feared Qin's better trained and equipped troops and decided on passive defense. The battle was a stalemate until 293 BC.

== Battle ==
Bai Qi noticed that Wei and Han were still hostile to each other, so he decided on the divide and conquer strategy. He scouted the area for weaknesses in the alliance defense. He drew away the attention of the main Han forces with small ambushes, then attacked the weakly defended Wei positions with the main Qin army.

The officers of Wei believed that Han deliberately failed to support the Wei army positions. Hostility grew worse between the two allies. Han decided to preserve its forces and ceased trying to support Wei. Bai Qi was therefore able to avoid fighting against Han forces. Over the next few months, he defeated Wei positions one by one.

Bai Qi then turned his attack against the Han forces. Eventually Han troops were trapped by Qin forces and they tried to escape. However the Qin cavalry ensured that no one made it back. Gongsun Xi was captured.

== Aftermath ==
This battle brought Qin influence for the first time into central China. Wei and Han's forces were destroyed after the Battle of Yique. Both states ceded land to Qin in return for temporary peace, but their eventual destruction was ensured. Qin conquered Han in 230 BC, and conquered Wei in 225 BC.

== Sources ==
Records of the Grand Historian
