= King Xuan of Chu =

King of Chinese state of Chu from 369 to 340 BC

King Xuan of Chu 楚宣王

King of Chu
- Reign: 369–340 BC
- Predecessor: King Su
- Successor: King Wei
- Died: 340 BC
- Issue: King Wei
Names
- Ancestral name: Mǐ (羋); Lineage name: Xióng (熊); Given name: Liángfū (良夫)
Posthumous name
- King Xuan (宣王)
- House: Mi
- Dynasty: Chu
- Father: King Dao

King Xuan of Chu (Chinese: 楚宣王; pinyin: Chǔ Xuān Wáng), personal name Xiong Liangfu, was from 369 BC to 340 BC the king of the Chu state.

King Xuan succeeded his older brother, King Su, who died without issue in 370 BC. During King Xuan's reign, Chu sent troops to aid the Zhao state during an invasion by the Wei state in 354 BC.

King Xuan died in 340 BC after 30 years of reign and was succeeded by his son, King Wei.

King Xuan of Chu House of Mi Died: 340 BC
Regnal titles
Preceded by King Su of Chu	King of Chu; 369–340 BC	Succeeded by King Wei of Chu
