= Changqingqiao, Ningxian =

Changqingqiao 长庆桥镇
- Town
- Location in Gansu Location in China
- Country: China
- Province: Gansu
- City: Pingliang
- County: Ningxian
- Elevation: 1,250 m (4,100 ft)

Population
  - Town: 12,457
  - Urban: 4,125

Changqingqiao is a town of Ningxian, Pingliang, Gansu, China. It is located in the southwest corner of Ningxian on the north bank of the Jing river.

Originally a small farming village, in the 1970s it was industrialized thanks to the discovery of oil. The town is the largest in Ningxian except for the county seat itself, and forms the southern gateway to the county through the G22 Qingdao–Lanzhou Expressway, China National Highway 224 and the Xi'an–Pingliang railway. It was established as a town in 1985.
