= King Dao of Chu =

King of Chinese state of Chu from 401 to 381 BC

King Dao of Chu 楚悼王

King of Chu
- Reign: 401–381 BC
- Predecessor: King Sheng
- Successor: King Su
- Died: 381 BC
- Issue: King Su; King Xuan
Names
- Ancestral name: Mǐ (羋); Lineage name: Xióng (熊); Given name: Yí (疑)
Posthumous name
- King Dao (悼王) or King Daozhe (悼折王)
- House: Mi
- Dynasty: Chu
- Father: King Sheng

King Dao of Chu (Chinese: 楚悼王; pinyin: Chǔ Dào Wáng), personal name Xiong Yi, was the king of the Chu state from 401 BC to 381 BC.

King Dao succeeded his father, King Sheng, who died in 402 BC. He died after a reign of 21 years; his son, King Su, succeeded him to the throne.

King Dao of Chu House of Mi Died: 381 BC
Regnal titles
Preceded by King Sheng of Chu	King of Chu; 401–381 BC	Succeeded by King Su of Chu
