= Zuo Shuzhang =

Zuo Shuzhang (左庶长, Chief of the Multitude on the Left) was a rank in the bureaucracy and nobility of ancient China. During the Warring States period it denoted a high rank in the State of Qin. During the Han dynasty it denoted the tenth of twenty orders of aristocratic rank.
