= King Huiwen of Qin =

First king of Qin

King Huiwen of Qin 秦惠文王
- Reign: 338–311 BC
- Predecessor: Duke Xiao of Qin
- Successor: King Wu of Qin
- Born: 356 BC
- Died: 311 BC (aged 44–45)
- Spouse: Queen Huiwen; Queen Dowager Xuan
- Issue: Tong, Marquis of Shu King Wu of Qin; King Zhaoxiang of Qin; Yun, Marquis of Shu; Shi, Lord Gaoling; Kui, Lord Jingyang; Queen Yi of Yan
Full name
- Family name: Ying (嬴); Given name: Si (駟) or Yin (駰)
Posthumous name
- King Huiwen (惠文王) or King Hui (惠王)
- House: Ying
- Dynasty: Qin
- Father: Duke Xiao of Qin

King Huiwen of Qin (Chinese: 秦惠文王; 356–311 BC), also known as Lord Huiwen of Qin (Chinese: 秦惠文君), personal name Ying Si, was a king of the state of Qin during the Eastern Zhou dynasty, reigning from 338 to 311 BC. He was the first ruler of Qin to style himself "King" (王) instead of "Duke" (公).

== Early life ==
Prince Si was the son of Duke Xiao, and succeeded his father as ruler after the latter's death. When the adolescent Si was still crown prince, he committed a crime and was severely punished for it. The great minister Shang Yang was just then implementing his Legalist reforms to the laws of Qin and he insisted that the crown prince should be punished for the crime regardless of his royal status. Duke Xiao approved of the draconian punishment and that of Si's tutors, Prince Qian (公子虔), Duke Xiao's older brother, and Gongsun Gu (公孫賈), for neglecting their duties in educating the crown prince; Prince Qian had his nose cut off, Gongsun received the punishment of qing (黥), a form of punishment which involved branding a criminal by tattooing his face, and Crown Prince Ying Si was banished from the royal palace.

It was believed that Si harboured a personal grudge against Shang Yang and when he came to the throne as King Huiwen, Si had Shang Yang put to death on charges of treason. However, Huiwen retained the reformed systems in Qin left behind by his father and Shang Yang.

== Reign ==
During Huiwen's reign, Qin became very militarily powerful and constantly invaded neighbouring states as part of its policy of expansionism. In 316 BC it conquered the kingdoms of Shu and Ba to the south, in the Sichuan basin. Qin's goal with these conquests was to annex and colonize these weaker independent kingdoms rather than confront the more advanced states to the east, nominally under the rule of the Zhou dynasty, with their large armies. The strategist Gongsun Yan, a student of Guiguzi, managed to persuade five of the other six major states to form an alliance to deal with Qin. However, Gongsun Yan's fellow student, Zhang Yi, came into the service of Huiwen as his prime minister and he helped Qin break up this alliance by sowing discord among the five states.

== Death ==
King Huiwen ruled Qin for 27 years and died in 311 BC at the age of 46. He was succeeded by his son, King Wu of Qin, born of Queen Huiwen.

== Family ==
Queens:

- Queen Huiwen, of Wei (惠文后; d. 305 BC), possibly a daughter of King Hui of Wei; married in 334 BC; the mother of Crown Prince Dang
- Queen Dowager Xuan, of the Mi clan of Chu (宣太后 羋姓; d. 265 BC), a royal of Chu by birth; the mother of Princes Ji, Shi and Kui

Sons:

- Prince Tong (公子通; d. 311 BC), ruled as the Marquis of Shu from 313–311 BC
- Crown Prince Dang (太子盪; 329–307 BC), ruled as King Wu of Qin from 310–307 BC
- Prince Zhuang (公子壯; d. 305 BC)
- Prince Yong (公子雍; d. 305 BC)
- Prince Ji (公子稷; 325–251 BC), ruled as King Zhaoxiang of Qin from 306–251 BC
- Prince Yun (公子惲; d. 301 BC), ruled as the Marquis of Shu from 308–301 BC
- Prince Shi (公子市)
  - Known by his title, Lord Gaoling (高陵君)
- Prince Kui (公子悝)
  - Known by his title, Lord Jingyang (涇陽君)
- Prince Yao (公子繇)
- Prince Chi (公子池)

Daughters:

- Queen Yi of Yan (燕易后)
  - Married King Yi of Yan (d. 321 BC) in 334 BC

== In fiction and popular culture ==
- Portrayed by Fu Dalong in The Qin Empire II: Alliance (2012)
- Portrayed by Alex Fong in The Legend of Mi Yue (2015)
- Portrayed by Gallen Lo in Song of Phoenix (2017)

King Huiwen of Qin House of Ying Died: 311 BC
Regnal titles
Preceded by Duke Xiao as Duke of Qin	King of Qin; 338–311 BC	Succeeded by King Wu
