= King Hui of Chu =

King of the State of Chu, 488 to 432 BC

King Hui of Chu 楚惠王

King of Chu
- Reign: 488–432 BC
- Predecessor: King Zhao
- Successor: King Jian
- Died: 432 BC
- Issue: King Jian
Names
- Ancestral name: Mǐ (羋); Lineage name: Xióng (熊); Given name: Zhāng (章)
Posthumous name
- King Hui (惠王) or King Xianhui (獻惠王)
- House: Mi
- Dynasty: Chu
- Father: King Zhao
- Mother: Yue Ji (越姬)

King Hui of Chu (Chinese: 楚惠王; pinyin: Chǔ Huì Wáng), personal name Xiong Zhang, was a monarch of the Chu state. Succeeding his father, King Zhao, in 488 BC, he ruled until his death in 432 BC. He was in turn succeeded by his son, King Jian.

In 478 BC, Xiong Sheng (熊勝), the Duke of Bai (白公), staged a coup d'état, killing Prime Minister Xiong Shen (熊申) and Chief Military Commander Xiong Jie (熊結), and abducting King Hui. Shen Zhuliang led his army to the capital, defeated Xiong Sheng, and restored King Hui's rule. Xiong Sheng then committed suicide.

King Hui of Chu House of Mi Died: 432 BC
Regnal titles
Preceded by King Zhao of Chu	King of Chu; 488–432 BC	Succeeded by King Jian of Chu
