= Ning County =

Ning County 宁县
- County
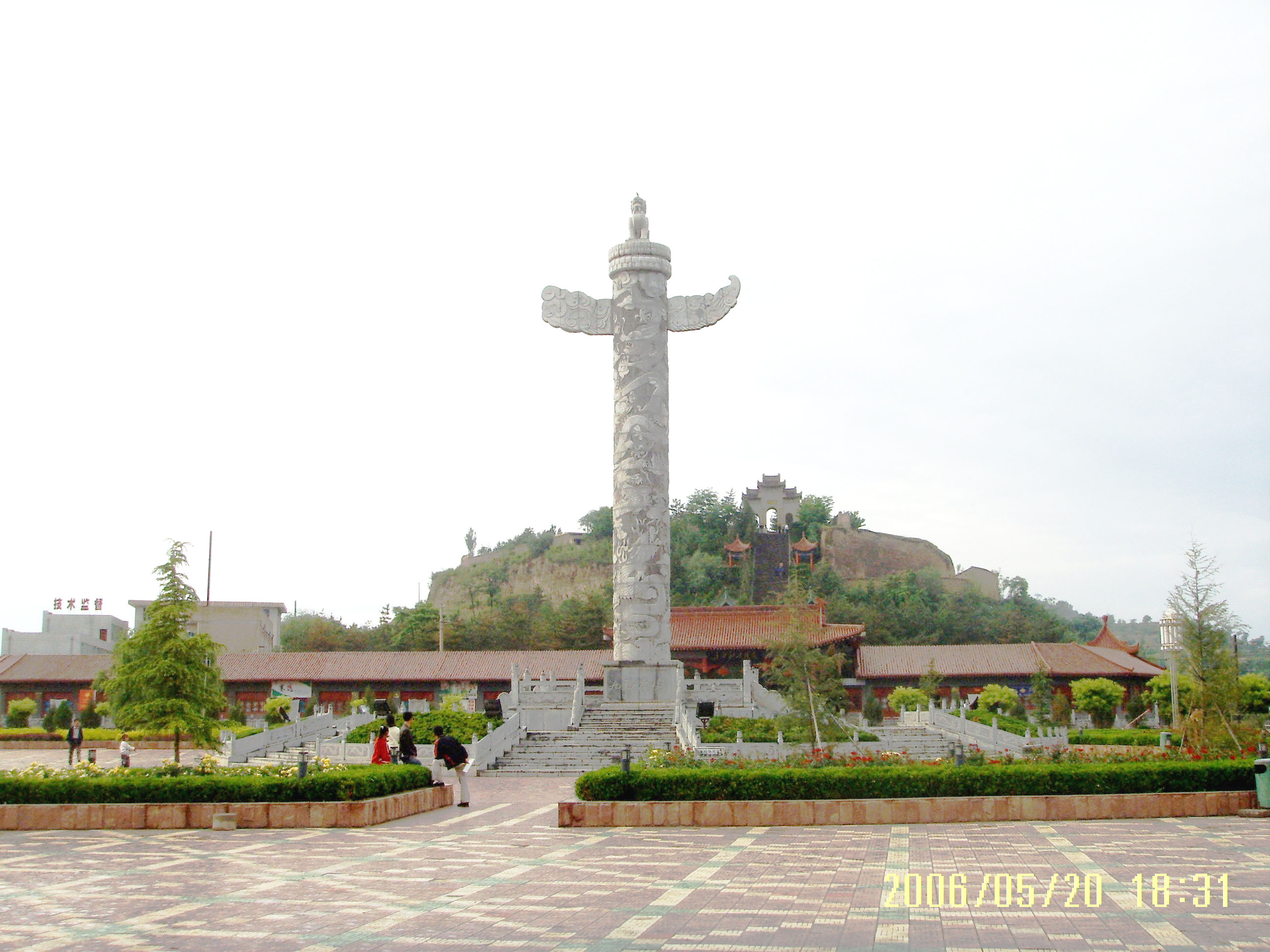

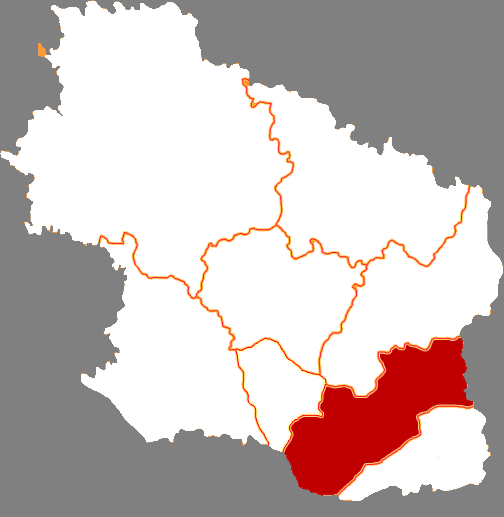
- Ning County in Qingyang

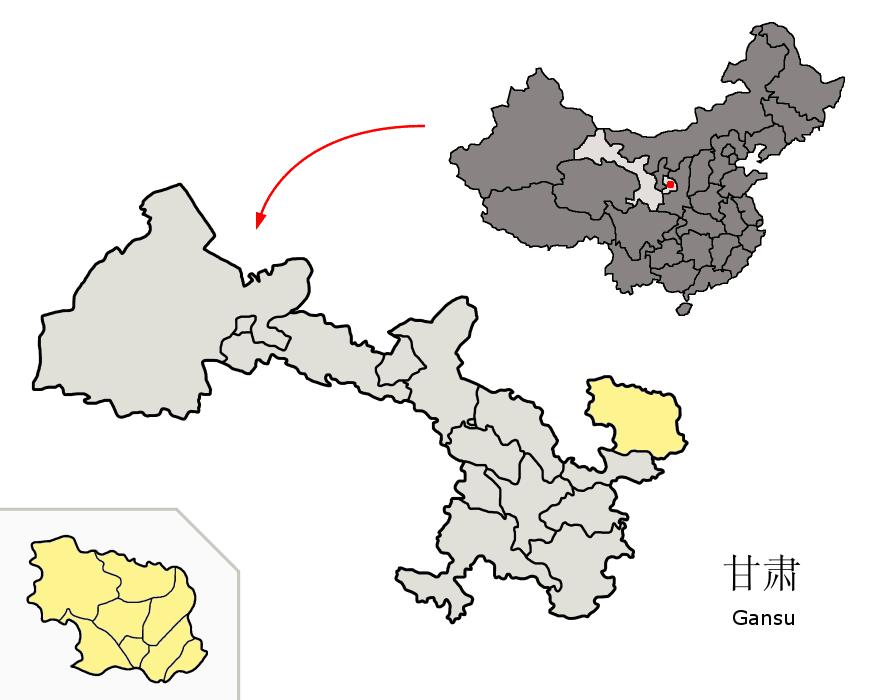
- Qingyang in Gansu
- Coordinates (Ning County government): 35°30′33″N 107°54′48″E
- Country: China
- Province: Gansu
- Prefecture-level city: Qingyang
- County seat: Xinning

Area
  - Total: 2,653.17 km^{2} (1,024.39 sq mi)

Population (2018)
  - Total: 561,240
  - Density: 211.54/km^{2} (547.87/sq mi)
- Time zone: UTC+8 (China Standard)
- Postal code: 745200
- Website: www.ningxian.gov.cn/yxnx

Ning County or Ningxian (simplified Chinese: 宁县; traditional Chinese: 寧縣; pinyin: Níng Xiàn) is a county in the east of Gansu province, China. It is under the administration of the prefecture-level city of Qingyang. Its postal code is 745200, and its population in 2018 was 561,240 people.

== History ==
The area of Ningxian is one of the earliest sites of Chinese civilization. The capital of the Yiqu was located in present Ningxian. Ningxian was established as a county during the Qin dynasty, later it was known as Ningzhou (宁州). In 1913 its name was changed to the present Ningxian.

== Geography ==
Ningxian is located on the Loess Plateau and has a rather humid climate. The main rivers in the county are the Jinghe river and the Malian river. A significant area of the county is forested.

== Climate ==
Climate data for Ningxian, elevation 979 m (3,212 ft), (1991–2020 normals, extremes 1981–2010)
Month	Jan	Feb	Mar	Apr	May	Jun	Jul	Aug	Sep	Oct	Nov	Dec	Year
Record high °C (°F)	15.7 (60.3)	20.7 (69.3)	26.4 (79.5)	29.2 (84.6)	33.7 (92.7)	35.2 (95.4)	37.3 (99.1)	34.7 (94.5)	34.6 (94.3)	27.4 (81.3)	21.2 (70.2)	16.7 (62.1)	37.3 (99.1)
Mean daily maximum °C (°F)	3.6 (38.5)	7.7 (45.9)	14.7 (58.5)	21.5 (70.7)	25.5 (77.9)	29.5 (85.1)	30.1 (86.2)	28.3 (82.9)	22.7 (72.9)	17.9 (64.2)	11.4 (52.5)	5.4 (41.7)	18.2 (64.8)
Daily mean °C (°F)	−4.8 (23.4)	−0.4 (31.3)	6.1 (43.0)	12.6 (54.7)	17.0 (62.6)	21.4 (70.5)	23.1 (73.6)	21.7 (71.1)	16.5 (61.7)	10.5 (50.9)	3.4 (38.1)	−3.0 (26.6)	10.3 (50.6)
Mean daily minimum °C (°F)	−10.5 (13.1)	−6.1 (21.0)	−0.5 (31.1)	5.0 (41.0)	9.7 (49.5)	14.2 (57.6)	17.8 (64.0)	17.2 (63.0)	12.6 (54.7)	5.9 (42.6)	−1.8 (28.8)	−8.4 (16.9)	4.6 (40.3)
Record low °C (°F)	−23.3 (−9.9)	−18.7 (−1.7)	−13.3 (8.1)	−6.4 (20.5)	−3.4 (25.9)	3.0 (37.4)	8.8 (47.8)	7.1 (44.8)	0.7 (33.3)	−8.5 (16.7)	−19.2 (−2.6)	−27.1 (−16.8)	−27.1 (−16.8)
Average precipitation mm (inches)	4.8 (0.19)	9.5 (0.37)	14.3 (0.56)	24.8 (0.98)	48.0 (1.89)	54.2 (2.13)	122.2 (4.81)	114.9 (4.52)	108.0 (4.25)	34.0 (1.34)	15.9 (0.63)	3.4 (0.13)	554 (21.8)
Average precipitation days (≥ 0.1 mm)	3.1	5.4	5.6	6.9	8.8	8.8	11.9	11.1	12.8	9.4	5.3	2.7	91.8
Average snowy days	4.0	5.7	2.2	0.4	0	0	0	0	0	0	1.7	3.2	17.2
Average relative humidity (%)	62	64	56	55	62	64	73	78	83	81	74	66	68
Mean monthly sunshine hours	177.9	161.3	209.5	236.5	239.7	230.5	207.6	186.4	128.8	146.2	156.0	174.3	2,254.7
Percentage possible sunshine	57	52	56	60	55	53	47	45	35	42	51	58	51
Source: China Meteorological Administration

== Economy ==
The county relies mostly on agriculture, its produce includes mutton, apples, apricots, carrots, dates, day lilies and morel mushrooms.

The town of Changqingqiao is the industry cluster of the county, home to chemical industry utilizing its coal, oil and natural gas reserves.

== Administrative divisions ==
Ning County is divided to 14 towns and 4 townships.

Towns

- Xinning (新宁镇)
- Pingzi (平子镇)
- Zaosheng (早胜镇)
- Changqingqiao (长庆桥镇)
- Hesheng (和盛镇)
- Xiangle (湘乐镇)
- Xinzhuang (新庄镇)
- Panke (盘克镇)
- Zhongcun (中村镇)
- Jiaocun (焦村镇)
- Miqiao (米桥镇)
- Liangping (良平镇)
- Taichang (太昌镇)
- Chunrong (春荣镇)

Townships

- Nanyi Township (南义乡)
- Waxie Township (瓦斜乡)
- Jincun Township (金村乡)
- Jiuxian Township (九岘乡)

== Culture ==
Local food from Ningxian includes 'dog tongue bun' (Chinese: 狗舌头馍; pinyin: Gǒu shétou mó), a bread shaped like a dog's tongue and 'sugar coins' (Chinese: 糖角子; pinyin: Gǒu shétou mó), a sugar-filled wheat bun.

In the TV series The Legend of Mi Yue, the capital of the Yiqu Country is set in Ningxian.

== Transportation ==
- G22 Qingdao–Lanzhou Expressway
- China National Highway 211

== See also ==
- List of administrative divisions of Gansu
