= King Huai of Chu =

King of Chinese state of Chu from 328 to 299 BC

King Huai of Chu 楚懷王

King of Chu
- Reign: 328–299 BC
- Predecessor: King Wei
- Successor: King Qingxiang
- Born: c. 355 BC
- Died: 296 BC
- Spouse: Zheng Xiu (鄭袖); Lady Wei (魏美人)
- Issue: King Qingxiang; Xiong Zilan (熊子蘭); Lord Yangwen (陽文君); Huang Xie (disputed)
Names
- Ancestral name: Mǐ (羋); Lineage name: Xióng (熊); Given name: Huái (槐)
Posthumous name
- King Huai (懷王)
- House: Mi
- Dynasty: Chu
- Father: King Wei

King Huai of Chu (Chinese: 楚懷王; pinyin: Chǔ Huái Wáng, 355-299 BC), personal name Xiong Huai, was from 328 BC to 299 BC the king of the Chu state.

King Huai succeeded his father, King Wei, who died in 329 BC. In 299 BC, King Huai was trapped and held hostage by King Zhao of Qin when he depart to the Qin state for negotiation. King Huai's son, King Qingxiang, then ascended the Chu throne. King Huai managed to escape but was recaptured by Qin. Three years later, he died in captivity.

One of his grandsons was later reinstated as King of Chu as the Qin dynasty descended into chaos, under the regnal name "King Huai of Chu".

== Reign ==
In 329 BC, King Wei died, and King Huai ascended the throne. Wei took advantage of the situation to attack Chu and captured Mount Xing. Six years later, King Huai sent general Zhao Yang to defeat Wei at Xiangling (modern-day Sui County, Henan), seized eight cities and then advancing against Qi. In 318 BC, as the leader of coalition, King Huai together with Yan, Han, and Wei attacked Qin at the disastrous Battle of Hangu Pass.

In 313 BC, Qin’s strategist Zhang Yi tried driving a wedge between Chu and Qi by persuading King Huai to sever the alliance with Qi in exchange for Qin ceding 600 li of Shang territory to Chu. King Huai fell for the trick, broke off relations with Qi, but Zhang Yi later only awarded six li of land. Enraged, King Huai sent general Qu Kai and his deputy Feng Houchou leading 100,000 troops from northwest of Mount Tianzhu to attack Qin, but they were crushed by Wei Zhang at Danyang (west of modern Xixia County, Henan, north of the Dan River). Qu Kai was captured, while his 80,000 troops were beheaded. King Huai then mobilized the entire army for another offensive against Qin but suffered another disastrous defeat at Lantian. These two battles became known together as the battles of Danyang and Lantian. Qin then seized Hanzhong, then in 311 BC, Qin captured Shaoling, and after three consecutive defeats, Chu began to decline.

By 306 BC, Chu took advantage of internal turmoil in Yue, allied with Qi, and attacked Yue. Both states occupied Yue’s capital (present-day Suzhou), killed King Wujiang, and conquered all the land from Wu down to Zhejiang, establishing Jiangdong as a commandery. Yue collapsed while its royal remnants fled to the old Yue territories, and its clans competed for power, some proclaiming themselves regional kings or lords, by settling along the southern coast. In the next year, Chu allied with Qin through marriage. Two years later, Chu was besieged by Qi, Han, and Wei. Seeking aid, King Huai sent Crown Prince Heng as a hostage to Qin, forcing the three states to lift the siege. In 302 BC, while being a hostage in Qin, Crown Prince Heng killed a Qin official in a private quarrel and fled back to Chu. Qin retaliated the next year by allying with Qi, Han, and Wei to attack Chu, defeated General Tang Mei and seized Chongqiu of Pingyuan Commandery. In 300 BC, Qin again attacked Chu, defeated general Jing Que. Feared by Qin’s military might, King Huai sent Crown Prince Heng to Qi, again as a hostage. In the next year, Qin captured eight Chu cities. King Zhao of Qin invited King Huai to negotiate a peace treaty at Wuguan. Ignoring the advice of his ministers Zhao Ju and Qu Yuan, King Huai departed, only to be detained by Qin. King Zhao demanded Chu to cede Wu and Qianzhong as a requirement for his release, but King Huai refused. While King Huai was held captive, the Chu people enthroned Crown Prince Heng as King Qingxiang of Chu.

In 297 BC, Han and Wei allied to attack Qin at Hangu Pass. King Huai attempted to escape during the chaos, but Qin troops blocked the roads to Chu. He fled via country roads north into Zhao territory, however Zhao refused his entry. He then tried to flee to Wei but was captured by Qin pursuers. In the next year, King Huai died of illness in captivity. Qin returned his body to Chu, where “the Chu people all mourned him as if grieving for kin”.

== Culture ==
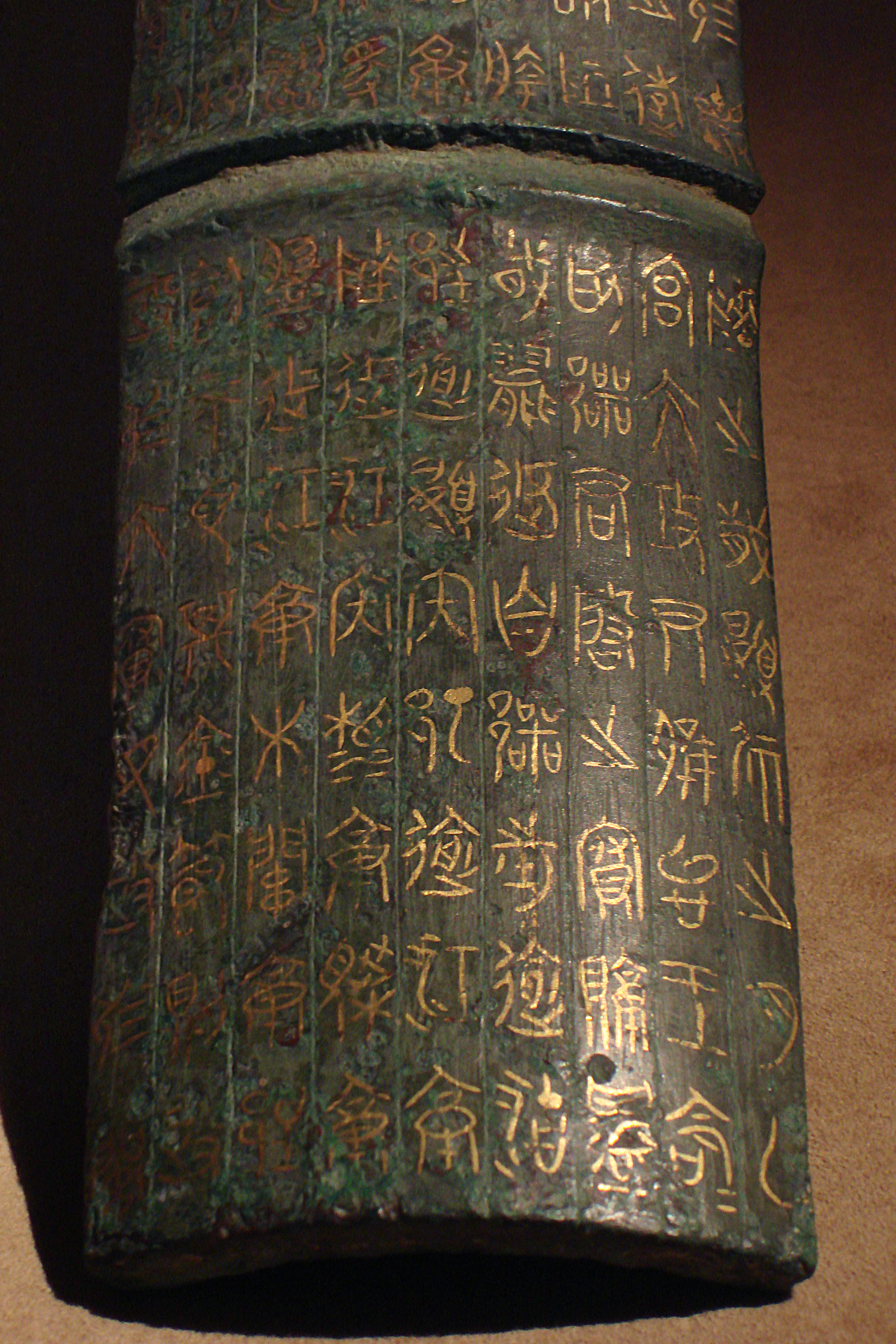
Detail of shou jie (shipping transit pass) issued to Prince Qi. Gold inscriptions on bronze in the shape of bamboo, issued by King Huai of Chu to the subkingdom of E, in 323 BCE.

King Huai's historical fame is especially due to the poetry of Qu Yuan, and other early Classical Chinese poetry, as preserved in the Chu ci: particularly and seminally the poem "Li Sao" (sometimes translated as "Encountering Sorrow") is thought to reflect the political and personal relationships between Qu Yuan or the poet writing in his persona and King Huai. The main themes of "Li Sao" and the poems of the Sao genre include Qu Yuan's falling victim to intrigues in the court of Chu, his resulting exile, his desire to nevertheless remain pure and untainted by the corruption that was rife in the court, and his lamentations at the gradual decline of the once-powerful state of Chu. At the very end the poet, resigned, states his resolve to die, by drowning in the river.

== In fiction and popular culture ==
- Portrayed by Peng Bo in The Qin Empire II: Alliance (2012).
- Portrayed by Cao Zheng in The Legend of Mi Yue (2015).

== See also ==
- Chu Ci
- "Nine Regrets"
- Qin's wars of unification
- Qu Yuan

== Notes ==
King Huai of Chu House of Mi Died: 296 BCE
Regnal titles
Preceded by King Wei of Chu	King of Chu; 328–299 BCE	Succeeded by King Qingxiang of Chu
