= Wang Mu =

Wang Mu may refer to:

- Queen Mother of the West, Chinese deity
- Hyejong of Goryeo (912–945), king of Goryeo
