= Beijing Garden Expo Park =

Park in Beijing, China

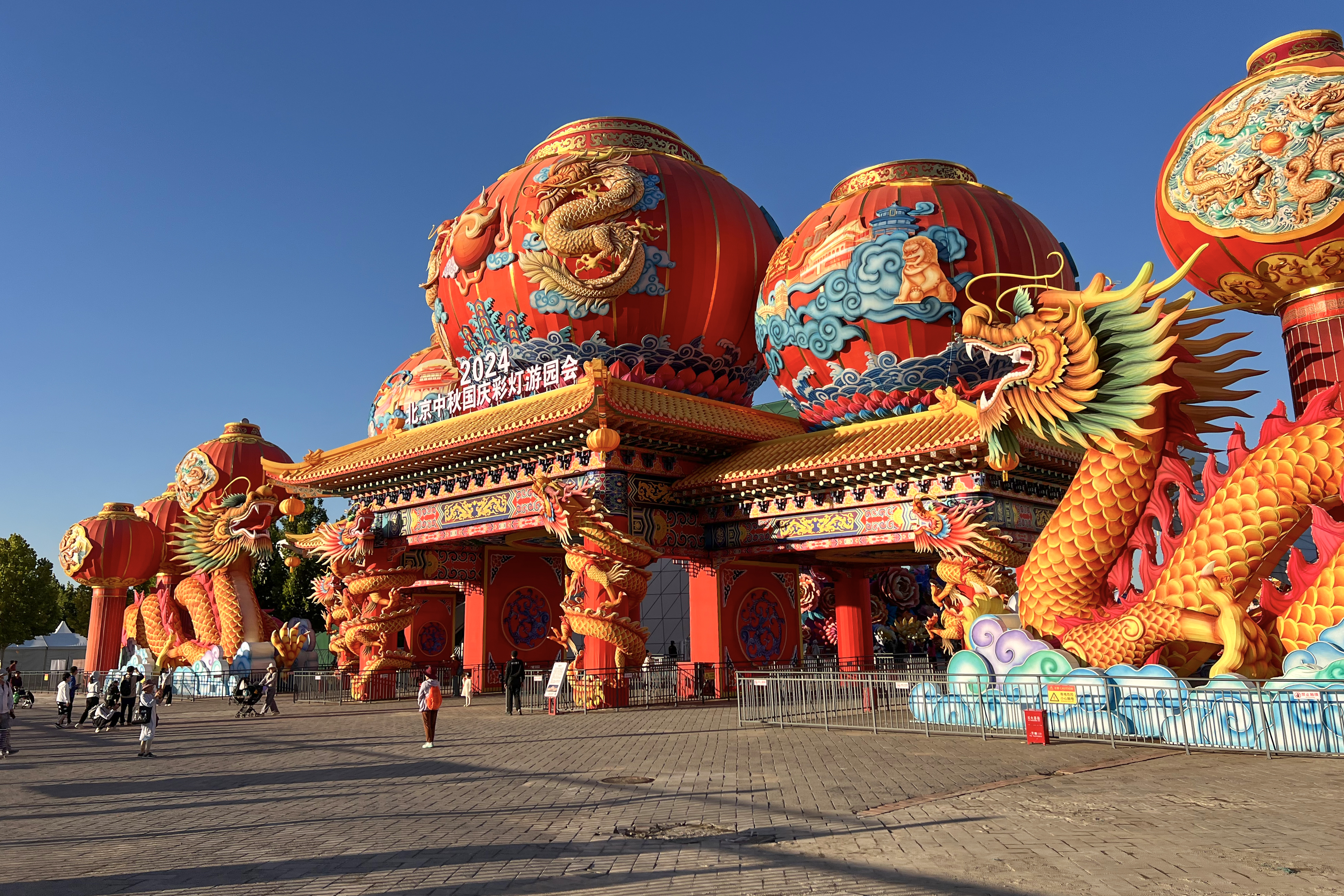
- Beijing Garden Expo Park during the Lantern Festival
- Interactive map of Beijing Garden Expo Park
- Type: Urban park, Forest park
- Location: Beijing, China
- Coordinates: 39.876504°N 116.17758°E
- Area: 267 hectares (660 acres)
- Created: 2013
- Status: Open all year

Beijing Garden Expo Park (北京园博园) (formerly known as Yingshan Forest Park) is located in Fengtai District, Beijing, near the Yongding River and Marco Polo Bridge. It was the site of the 2013 Garden Expo. After the expo, the park was reconstructed and open to public as an urban and forest park. The park is located on the east–west axis of urban Beijing. It has five sub-parks that hold different landscapes. It is also home to an important area of wetlands in Beijing.

== Transport ==
- Garden Expo Park station, on Line 14 of Beijing Subway
