= Queen Daowu =

Queen Ji, personal name unknown, formally Queen Wu or Queen Daowu, of the Wei lineage of the Ji clan of Wei (悼武后 姬姓 魏氏), a princess of Wei by birth (4th century BC), was the queen consort of King Wu of Qin, who reigned from 310 to 307 BC.
