= King Wei of Chu =

King Wei of Chu 楚威王

King of Chu
- Reign: 339–329 BC
- Predecessor: King Xuan
- Successor: King Huai
- Died: 329 BC
- Issue: King Huai
Names
- Ancestral name: Mǐ (羋); Lineage name: Xióng (熊); Given name: Shāng (商)
Posthumous name
- King Wei (威王)
- House: Mi
- Dynasty: Chu
- Father: King Xuan

King Wei of Chu, personal name Xiong Shang, was a monarch of the Chu state, reigning from 339 BC to 329 BC. During his reign, the Chu state reached its peak in territorial size, encompassing the middle to lower stretches of the Yangtze and the basin of the Huai River.

== Name ==
The precise nature of the Chu language is uncertain but it was probably non-Sinitic. This figure's personal name was calqued or translated into Old Chinese using the character now written 商, pronounced Shāng in Standard Mandarin and with the proposed ancient pronunciation of *S-taŋ. He belonged to the Chu royal house, the Xiong (熊, *Gʷəm, "Bear") branch of the Mi (羋) family, now conjectured to transcribe a Kam–Tai word for "bear".

He was known posthumously as the Awesome King of Chu (楚威王, Chǔ Wēiwáng or Chǔ Wēi Wáng, *S.r̥aʔ ʔujɢʷaŋ), often mistreated as a personal name in English.

== Life ==
Shang was the son of Xiong Liangfu, known posthumously as the Xuan King of Chu. Upon his father's death in 340 or 339 BC, Shang succeeded him as king of Chu.

During his reign, Chu and Qi defeated and partitioned the state of Yue to their southeast in 334 or 333 BC, giving Chu control over Suzhou, the Yangtze River Delta, and Wu's canal network.

Shang died in 329 BC and was succeeded by his son Huai, known posthumously as the Huai King.

== In fiction and popular culture ==
- Portrayed by Winston Chao in The Legend of Mi Yue (2015)

King Wei of Chu House of Mi Died: 329 BC
Regnal titles
Preceded by King Xuan of Chu	King of Chu; 339–329 BC	Succeeded by King Huai of Chu
