= King Wu of Qin =

Ruler of Qin, China from 310 to 307 BC

King Wu of Qin 秦武王
- King of Qin
- Reign: 310–307 BC
- Predecessor: King Huiwen
- Successor: King Zhaoxiang
- Born: 329 BC
- Died: 307 BC (aged 21–22)
- Spouse: Queen Daowu
Full name
- Family name: Ying (嬴); Given name: Dang (蕩)
Posthumous name
- King Wu (武王) or King Daowu (悼武王) or King Wulie (武烈王) or King Yuanwu (元武王)
- House: Ying
- Dynasty: Qin
- Father: King Huiwen of Qin
- Mother: Queen Huiwen

King Wu of Qin (Chinese: 秦武王; 329–307 BC), personal name Ying Dang, was a king of the state of Qin during the Eastern Zhou dynasty, reigning from 310 to 307 BC.

Despite his short time as ruler, King Wu played a part in Qin's wars of unification, mainly through his efforts against the state of Han. He also invaded some of the other major powers of the Warring States period, notably the state of Wei. In the fourth year of King Wu's reign, his minister Gan Mao (甘茂), suggested an attack on the Han fortress of Yiyang to open up a path to invade the eastern powers. The campaign succeeded and Qin subsequently gained control of the key roads to the Eastern Zhou capital of Luoyang.

While visiting Luoyang, King Wu, a keen wrestler, decided to try powerlifting a heavy bronze cauldron in the Eastern Zhou palace as a show of his own physical strength, urged on by a strongman he favoured named Meng Yue (孟說). By lifting the cauldron, he also wanted to prove that he had received the mandate of heaven to rule China. Though he successfully lifted the cauldron, the king broke his shin bones while trying to carry it. At night, blood came out of his eyes, and he died very soon afterwards. He had ascended the throne at the age of 18–19, and died aged 21–22, having only ruled for about three years.

After King Wu's death, Gan Mao left Qin to serve Wei. Since King Wu died young without issue, it threw Qin into a succession crisis, with multiple brother-princes contending for the throne. Eventually, King Wu's younger half-brother Prince Ji, who was held as a political hostage in the state of Yan at the time, returned to Qin with the support of his uncle Wei Ran (魏冉) and King Wuling of Zhao and ascended to the throne.

== Family ==
Queens:

- Queen Daowu, of the Wei lineage of the Ji clan of Wei (悼武后 姬姓 魏氏), a princess of Wei by birth

== In fiction and popular culture ==
- Portrayed by Ba Tu in The Legend of Mi Yue (2015)
- Portrayed by He Ziming in The Qin Empire II: Alliance (2012)

King Wu of Qin House of Ying Died: 307 BC
Regnal titles
Preceded by King Huiwen	King of Qin; 310–307 BC	Succeeded by King Zhaoxiang
