= Zheng Xiu =

Queen consort of King Huai

Zheng Xiu (4th-century BC), was the queen consort of King Huai of Chu, who reigned in 328-299 BC.

She was involved in state affairs and has traditionally been blamed for the captivity of her spouse and ensuing political instability.
