= Jing River =

River in Gansu and Shaanxi, China

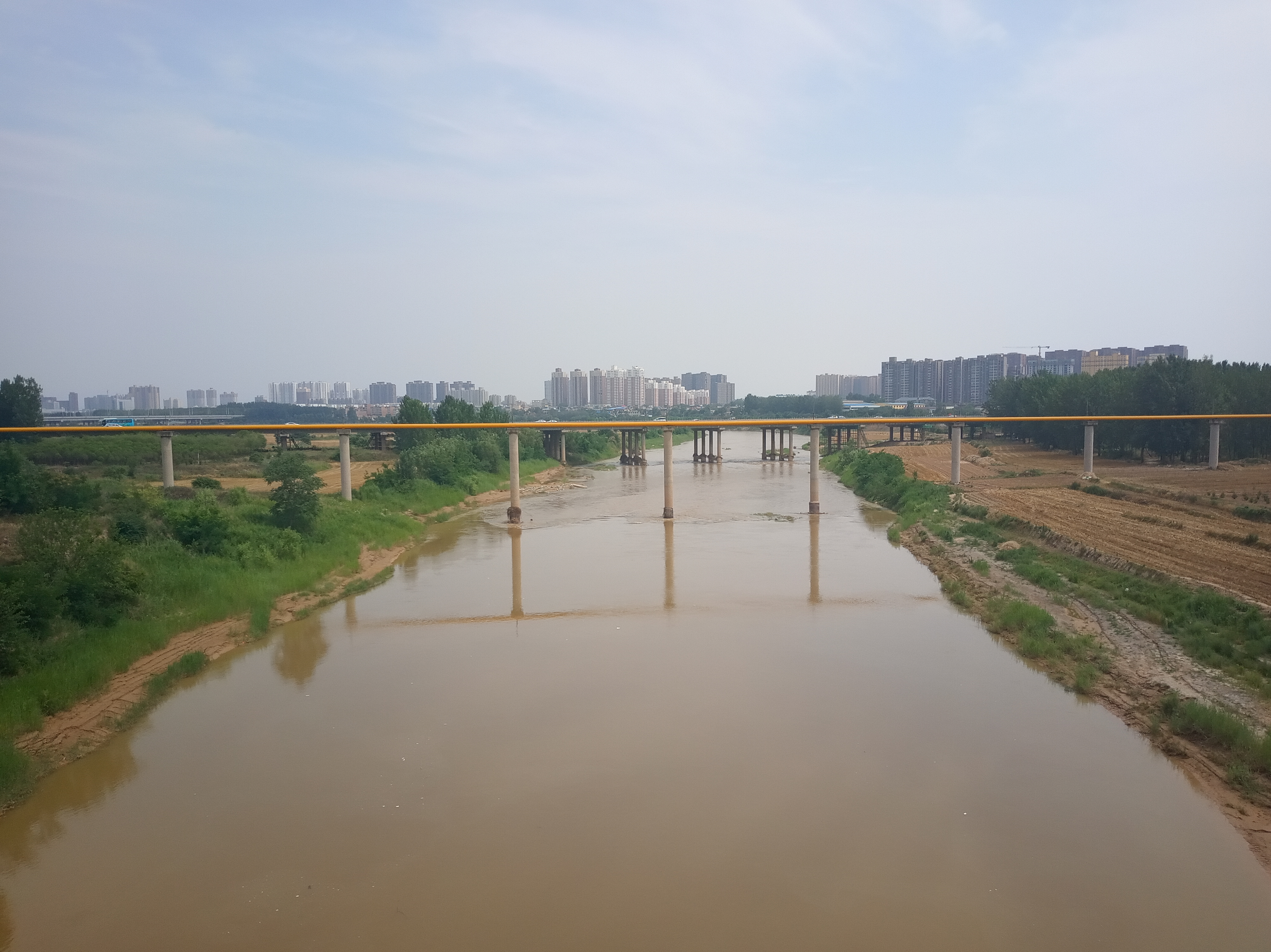
- Jing River in Jingyang County, close to where it flows into the Wei River

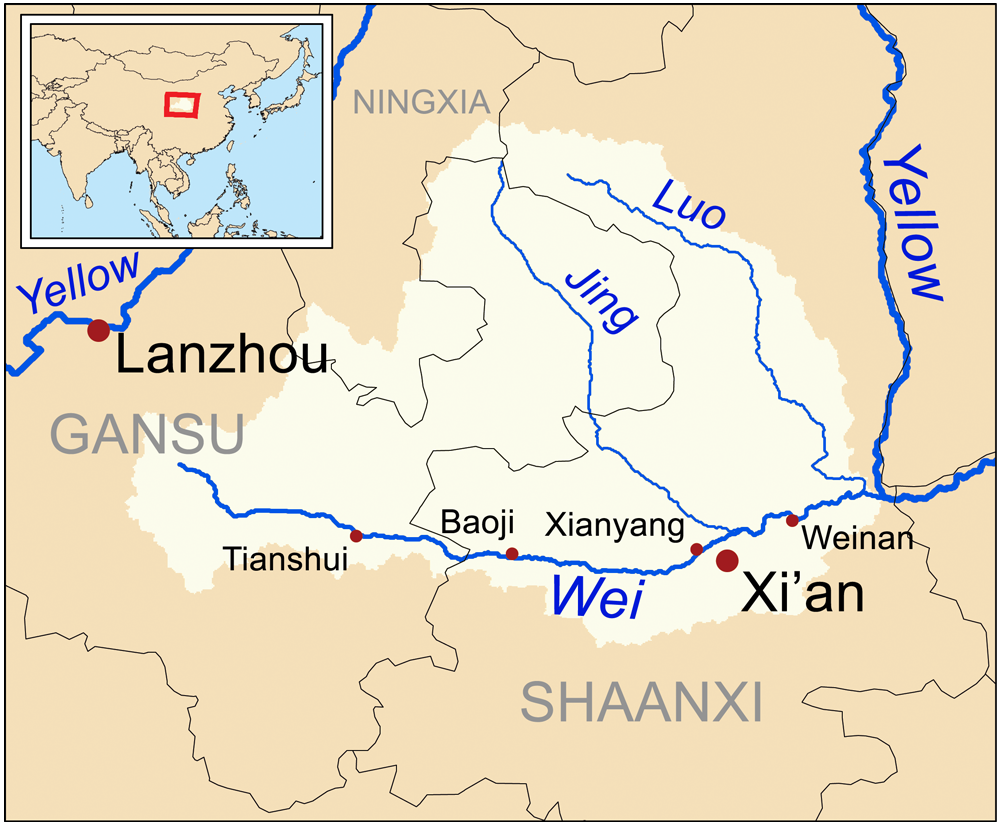

Physical characteristics
- Mouth: 34°28′10″N 109°04′02″E
- Length: 455.1 km (282.8 mi)
- Basin size: 45,421 km^{2} (17,537 sq mi)

Basin features
- Population: 9.48 million

The Jing River (simplified Chinese: 泾河; traditional Chinese: 涇河) or Jing He (Pinyin: Jīng Hé), also called Jing Shui (simplified Chinese: 泾水; traditional Chinese: 涇水), is a tributary of the Wei River (Chinese: 渭河), which in turn is the largest tributary of the Yellow River.

The Jing River flows for 455.1 kilometres (282.8 mi), with a basin area of 45,421 square kilometres (17,537 mi^{2}). The river's flow varies greatly throughout the year, and soil erosion causes serious problems in its basin. Summer floods cause the Jing to be laden with sediment; in the dry season, the river flows with relatively clear water.

The river flows through important farming areas, and its basin is inhabited by 9.5 million people.

Water in the Jing River comes from Mount Liupan in Ningxia Hui Autonomous Region and flows through Gansu and Shaanxi, where it joins the Wei River in Gaoling District of Xi'an. Other than its upper reaches, the river flows through loess landscape throughout its length.

According to Chinese mythology a Dragon King ruled over the river. The Jing River basin is one of birthplaces of ancient Chinese civilization such as the Zhou dynasty.

== Tributaries ==
Major tributaries of the Jing include the Malian, Pu, and Hong.

== See also ==
- List of rivers in China
