= 260s BC =

Decade

This article concerns the period 269 BC – 260 BC.

== Events ==
=== 269 BC ===
==== By place ====
====== Sicily ======
- The Mamertines, a body of Campanian mercenaries who have been employed by Agathocles, the former tyrant of Syracuse, capture the stronghold of Messana (Messina in north-eastern Sicily), from which they harass the Syracusans. The Syracusan military leader, Hieron, defeats them in a pitched battle at the Longanus River near Mylae, but Carthaginian forces intervene to prevent him from capturing Messana. His grateful countrymen then choose Hieron as their king and tyrant, to be known as Hieron II.

=== 268 BC ===
==== By place ====
====== Roman Republic ======
- The Roman denarius coin is minted for the first time.
- The Romans found a colony at Malventum which they, for superstitious reasons, call Beneventum (since male means bad and bene means good in Latin).
- The Romans found a colony at Ariminum.

====== Greece ======
- Chremonides, an Athenian statesman and general, issues the Decree of Chremonides, creating an alliance between Sparta, Athens, and Ptolemy II of Egypt. The origins of this alliance lay in the continuing desire of many Greek states, notably Athens and Sparta, for a restoration of their former independence, along with the desire of Ptolemy II to create troubles for his rival Antigonus II, King of Macedonia. Ptolemy II's ambitions in the Aegean Sea are threatened by Antigonus Gonatas' fleet, so he carefully builds up a coalition of the rest of the Greeks against Macedonians. He especially cultivates Athens by supplying the city with grain.

====== India ======
- May 16 – Ashoka becomes emperor of the Maurya Empire.

=== 267 BC ===
==== By place ====
====== Greece ======
- Macedonia's King Antigonus II Gonatas has to deal with a rebellion by an Athenian-led coalition of Spartans (led by King Areus I of Sparta), Athenians (led by Chremonides), Arcadians and Achaeans that tries to expel the Macedonian forces located in southern Greece. The rebellion has the support of Ptolemy II of Egypt.

=== 266 BC ===
==== By place ====
====== Roman Republic ======
- January 23 – Marcus Atilius Regulus and Lucius Julius Libo celebrate triumphs over the Salentini.
- Calabria and Messapia are annexed by the Roman Republic.

====== Asia Minor ======
- Ariobarzanes becomes the second king of Pontus, succeeding his father Mithridates I Ctistes.

====== India ======
- The Mauryan emperor Ashoka converts to Buddhism.

=== 265 BC ===
==== By place ====
====== Greece ======
- Although the Egyptian fleet blockades the Saronic Gulf, the Macedonian King Antigonus II defeats the Spartans and kills the king of Sparta, Areus I near Corinth, after which he besieges Athens.
- Acrotatus II succeeds his father Areus I as king of Sparta.

====== Italy ======
- Hiero II threatens to renew his attack on the Mamertines. They appeal to Carthage and receive the support of a Carthaginian garrison. The Mamertines also appeal to the Romans who are also willing to help.
- The Battle of Messana (265-264 BCE) takes place as the first military clash between the Roman Republic and Carthage.
- The Etruscan city of Volsinii is brought under Roman control. During a siege, the consul Quintus Fabius Maximus Gurges is killed.

====== China ======
- The State of Zhao stations general Li Mu in Yanmen Commandery, where he proceeds to win multiple victories over the Xiongnu.

==== By topic ====
====== Arts & sciences ======
- The Archimedes screw for raising water is devised by the Greek mathematician Archimedes, who is studying at Alexandria.

=== 264 BC ===
==== By place ====
====== Greece ======
- Abantidas, the son of Paseas, becomes tyrant of the Greek city-state of Sicyon after murdering Cleinias. He either banishes or puts to death Cleinias' friends and relations. Cleinias' young son, Aratus, narrowly escapes death.

====== Roman Republic ======
- Start of war between the Romans and the Carthaginians-First Punic War
- The tyrant of Syracuse, Hiero II, once more attacks the Mamertines. They ally themselves with a nearby Carthaginian fleet and hold off the Syracusans. However, when the Carthaginians do not leave, the Mamertines appeal to Rome for an alliance, hoping for more reliable protection. Although initially reluctant to assist, lest it encourage other mercenary groups to mutiny, Rome is unwilling to see Carthaginian power spread further over Sicily and encroach on Italy. Rome therefore enters into an alliance with the Mamertines. By this action, the First Punic War begins and will embroil Rome in a conflict with Carthage that will continue for 23 years.
- The Roman consul Appius Claudius Caudex and his two legions are deployed to Sicily, the first time a Roman army has gone into action outside the Italian peninsula.
- Appius Claudius Caudex leads his forces to Messina, and as the Mamertines have convinced the Carthaginians to withdraw, he meets with only minimal resistance. The Mamertines hand the city over to Appius Claudius, but the Carthaginians return to set up a blockade. The Syracusans, meanwhile, are also stationed outside the city.
- Appius Claudius leads his troops outside the city of Messina to defeat the Syracusans in battle forcing Hiero to retreat back to Syracuse. The next day Claudius defeats the Carthaginians.
- The temple to Vertumnus is built on the Aventine Hill in Rome.
- Three pairs of gladiators face off in the first recorded gladiatorial combat, held at the funeral games in honour of aristocrat Junius Brutus Pera in the Forum Boarium.

====== China ======
- General Bai Qi of the State of Qin attacks the State of Han and captures the city of Jing, defeating its large garrison. He then captures various other towns and cities.
- The Confucian philosopher Xunzi visits the State of Qin. He writes of his and others' admiration for the government officials of Qin, whom he says are serious and sincere, free from the tendency to form cliques. The Qin officials are disciplined by a meritocracy of rather harsh methods imposed by the Legalist philosophy.

=== 263 BC ===
==== By place ====
====== Roman Republic ======
- The Romans under the consul Manius Valerius Messalla secure the alliance of Hiero II of Syracuse. The treaty with Rome restricts Hiero's kingdom to southeast Sicily and the eastern coast of Sicily as far as Tauromenium. From this date until his death, Hiero remains loyal to the Romans.
- The Romans capture Catania in Sicily under Messalla. A sundial is part of the booty, which is placed in the Comitium in Rome and will be significant in Roman timekeeping.

====== Greece ======
- Alexander II of Epirus attacks and conquers the greater part of Macedonia. However, he is then driven out of both Macedonia and Epirus by Demetrius II, the son of King Antigonus II Gonatas of Macedonia.
- The Athenians and Spartans, worn down by several years of war and the devastation of their lands, make peace with Antigonus II of Macedonia who thus retains his hold on southern Greece.
- Cleanthes succeeds Zeno of Citium in his Stoic School in Athens.

====== Asia Minor ======
- Eumenes I succeeds his uncle Philetaerus on the throne of Pergamum. As Philetaerus is a eunuch, he adopts his nephew Eumenes (the son of Philetaerus' brother also named Eumenes) as his successor.

====== China ======
- General Bai Qi of the State of Qin captures the Han province of Nan, thereby cutting off Shangdang Commandery from the rest of the Han state. This commandery subsequently surrenders itself to the State of Zhao rather than transfer to Qin control, which will set up the climactic Battle of Changping in 260 BC.

=== 262 BC ===
==== By place ====
====== Greece ======
- After Athens surrenders in the Chremonidean War following a long siege by Macedonian forces, Antigonus II Gonatas re-garrisons Athens and forbids the city from making war. Otherwise, he leaves Athens alone as the seat of philosophy and learning in Greece.

====== Roman Republic ======
- Rome besieges the city of Agrigentum which is held by Carthage under the command of Hannibal Gisco. Rome's siege involves both consular armies – a total of four Roman legions – and takes several months to resolve. The garrison of Agrigentum manages to call for reinforcements and a Carthaginian relief force commanded by Hanno comes to the rescue and destroys the Roman supply base at Erbessus. Nevertheless, after a few skirmishes, the battle of Agrigentum is fought and won by Rome, and the city falls. Gisco manages to escape to Carthage in the late stages of the battle.
- After the loss of Agrigentum, the Carthaginians retire to organise their fleet. In the meantime, the Romans sack Agrigentum and enslave its Greek inhabitants. The Romans are now determined to drive the Carthaginians out of Sicily.

====== Seleucid Empire ======
- Seleucid king Antiochus I's eldest son Seleucus, who has ruled in the east of the kingdom as viceroy for a number of years, is put to death by his father on the charge of rebellion.
- Antiochus I tries to break the growing power of Pergamum by force of arms. Eumenes I, the new ruler of Pergamum, liberates his city from the overlordship of the Seleucids by defeating the army of Antiochus I near Sardis (the capital of Lydia), and thereby establishing an independent city-state.
- Antiochus I dies and is succeeded by his second son Antiochus II Theos.

=== 261 BC ===
==== By place ====
====== Roman Republic ======
- The Romans, determined to win control of Sicily from Carthage, build a fleet based on the model of a captured Carthaginian quinquereme.

====== Seleucid Empire ======
- The new Seleucid king Antiochus II reaches an agreement with the king of Macedonia, Antigonus II Gonatas, to work together in trying to push Ptolemy II's fleet and armies out of the Aegean Sea. With Macedonia's support, Antiochus II launches an attack on Ptolemaic outposts in Asia Minor.

====== India ======
- Mauryan Emperor Ashoka wages a war against the independent kingdom of Kalinga, culminating in the Battle of the Dhauli Hills. In the aftermath, Kalinga is annexed into the Mauryan Empire, but the brutality of the war is believed to have led to Ashoka's conversion to Buddhism, as described in his many Edicts of Ashoka.

====== China ======
- The armies of the State of Qin and State of Zhao contest control of the area around Changping. After suffering defeats to general Wang He of Qin and the superior Qin army, general Lian Po of Zhao refuses to give battle, resulting in a stalemate.

=== 260 BC ===
==== By place ====
====== Sicily ======
- The Roman advance continues westward from Agrigentum with their forces relieving the besieged cities of Segesta and Macella. These cities have sided with the Roman cause, and have come under Carthaginian attack for doing so.
- Hannibal Gisco returns to fight in Sicily as the admiral in charge of the Carthaginian fleet in the Strait of Messina. With the Romans about to launch their first ever navy, Carthage is determined that this innovation be thwarted. Gisco defeats part of the Roman fleet and captures the Roman consul Gnaeus Cornelius Scipio Asina in an encounter near Lipari; the consul's nickname Asina (which means donkey) is earned in this encounter. However, this Carthaginian victory is of limited practical value as the bulk of the Roman fleet continues to manoeuvre in the surrounding waters.
- Confident in Carthage's superiority at sea, Hannibal Gisco deploys his ships for the Battle of Mylae in the traditional long line arrangement. Although inexperienced in sea battles, the Romans, led by consul Gaius Duilius Nepos, heavily defeat the Carthaginian fleet, mainly due to the innovative use of land tactics in naval warfare (including the use of the grappling irons and the corvus boarding bridge).
- Having lost the confidence of his peers, Hannibal Gisco is subsequently executed for incompetence shortly afterwards, together with other defeated Punic generals.
- In the north of Sicily, the Romans, with their northern sea flank secured by their naval victory in the Battle of Mylae, advance toward Thermae. They are defeated there by the Carthaginians under Hamilcar.

====== Egypt ======
- Callimachus of Cyrene, learned poet and grammarian, becomes chief librarian at the Library of Alexandria.

====== China ======
- Battle of Changping between the state of Qin and state of Zhao:

- Frustrated with the stalemate and encouraged by Qin spies, King Xiaocheng of Zhao replaces general Lian Po with the less cautious Zhao Kuo. Hearing of this, King Zhaoxiang of Qin secretly sends the famous general Bai Qi to take control of the Qin army.
- The Qin army under Bai Qi destroys the army of Zhao, establishing Qin's military superiority over all other Chinese states during the Warring States period. The battle takes place near modern-day Gaoping in Shanxi and hundreds of thousands of soldiers from Zhao are executed after the battle.

== Births ==
269 BC

- Attalus I Soter, ruler of Pergamon, from 241 to 197 BC. He will be the first of the Attalid dynasty to assume the title of king (d. 197 BC).

268 BC

- Fu Sheng (Master Fu), Chinese Confusian scholar (d. 178 BC)
- Li Yiji, Chinese politician and adviser (d. 204 BC)

267 BC

- Berenice II, queen and co-regent of Egypt (or 266 BC)

266 BC

- Berenice II, queen and co-regent of Egypt (or 267 BC)

265 BC

- Agis IV, king of Sparta (approximate date)
- Ziaelas, king of Bithynia (approximate date)

263 BC

- Antigonus III Doson, king of Macedonia from 229 to 221 BC (d. 221 BC)

262 BC

- Apollonius of Perga (Pergaeus), Greek astronomer and mathematician specialising in geometry and noted for his writings on conic sections (d. c. 190 BC)

260 BC

- Zheng, who will later become king of the State of Qin, and then later the First Emperor of China (d. 210 BC)

== Deaths ==
267 BC

- Devanampiya Tissa, ruler of Anuradhapura (Sri Lanka)

266 BC

- Huiwen of Zhao, Chinese king of Zhao (b. 310 BC)
- Mithridates I Ctistes, founder of the kingdom of Pontus

265 BC

- Alexinus, Greek philosopher of Elis
- Areus I, king of Sparta (killed in battle)
- Quintus Fabius Maximus Gurges, Roman consul
- Xiang of Qi, Chinese king of Qi (Warring States Period)
- Xuan, Chinese queen dowager of Chu (b. 338 BC)

263 BC

- Philetaerus, founder (reigned from 282 BC) of the Attalid kingdom of Pergamum, in northwest Asia Minor (b. c. 343 BC)
- Qingxiang of Chu, Chinese king of Chu (Warring States Period)

262 BC

- Antiochus I Soter, king of the Seleucid Kingdom from 281 BC (b. c. 323 BC)
- Acrotatus II, Agiad king of Sparta
- Philemon, Athenian poet and playwright of the New Comedy (b. c. 362 BC)
- Zeno of Citium, Hellenistic Stoic philosopher from Citium, Cyprus (b. 333 BC)

261 BC

- Antiochus I Soter, Greek king of the Hellenistic Seleucid Empire (or 262 BC)

260 BC

- Hannibal Gisco, Carthaginian military commander in charge of both land armies and naval fleets (b. c. 300 BC)
- Orontes III, king of Armenia and Sophene (modern-day Turkey)
- Timocharis of Alexandria, Greek astronomer and philosopher
- Zhao Kuo, Chinese general of the State of Zhao
