= Battle of Messana =

Battle between Rome and Carthage

- Part of the First Punic War
- Route taken by Punic army in order to reach Messana
Date	264 BC
Location	Messana (modern Messina) 38.1800°N 15.5614°E
Result	Roman victory

Belligerents
Roman Republic	Carthage; Syracuse

Commanders and leaders
Appius Claudius Caudex; Manius Valerius Maximus; Manius Otacilius Crassus	Hanno; Hiero II

Strength
9,000 soldiers	12,000 Syracusan and Carthaginian cavalry, hoplites and mercenaries

Casualties and losses
1,340 casualties	6,000 casualties

The Battle of Messana in 264 BC was the first military clash between the Roman Republic and Carthage. It marked the start of the First Punic War. In that period, and after the recent successes in southern Italy, Sicily became of increasing strategic importance to Rome.

== Background ==
The Greek historian Polybius states in Book One of The Histories: "Even after long consideration, the (Roman) Senate did not approve the proposal to send help to Messana; they took the view that any advantage which would result from relieving the place would be counterbalanced by the inconsistency of such an action. However, the people who had suffered grievously from the wars that had just ended and were in dire need of rehabilitation of every kind, were inclined to listen to the consuls. These men, besides stressing the national advantages Rome could secure if she intervened, also dwelt on the great gains which would clearly accrue to every individual citizen from the spoils of war, and so a resolution for sending help was carried. When his decree had been passed by the people, one of the consuls, Appius Claudius, was appointed to command an expedition, and was given orders to cross to Messana."

After this, the Mamertines forced the Punic garrison out of Messana and invited the Roman force into the city. The Carthaginians crucified the garrison commander, Hanno (not the son of Hannibal), on his return to Carthage for what was regarded as his cowardice and lack of judgement in leaving Messana.

== Battle ==
At the head of a force of several thousand men, Appius Claudius set out with orders to occupy Messana. Despite the Carthaginian naval advantage, the Roman crossing of the Strait of Messina was ineffectively opposed. As the Carthaginian garrison had already been expelled by the Mamertines, the Romans could quickly enter the city and move in against their enemies. Meeting the besiegers in battle, the Romans quickly defeated the Syracusans, then moved against the Carthaginians. The light infantry skirmished but soon fell back. The Roman and Carthaginian infantry engaged in the centre, while the cavalry fought on the flanks. However, the Romans gained the upper hand, and the Carthaginians retreated. After this victory, the Romans marched south and in turn besieged Syracuse, but they had neither a strong enough force nor the secure supply lines to prosecute a successful siege, and soon withdrew. Both the Romans and Carthaginians then began assembling more troops and naval vessels as the First Punic War enveloped Sicily.

== See also ==
- Mamertines
- Syracuse, Sicily
