= 269 BC =

269 BC in various calendars
- Gregorian calendar: 269 BC; CCLXIX BC
- Ab urbe condita: 485
- Ancient Egypt era: XXXIII dynasty, 55
- Pharaoh: Ptolemy II Philadelphus, 15
- Ancient Greek Olympiad (summer): 127th Olympiad, year 4
- Assyrian calendar: 4482
- Balinese saka calendar: N/A
- Bengali calendar: −862 – −861
- Berber calendar: 682
- Buddhist calendar: 276
- Burmese calendar: −906
- Byzantine calendar: 5240–5241
- Chinese calendar: 辛卯年 (Metal Rabbit); 2429 or 2222 — to — 壬辰年 (Water Dragon); 2430 or 2223
- Coptic calendar: −552 – −551
- Discordian calendar: 898
- Ethiopian calendar: −276 – −275
- Hebrew calendar: 3492–3493
- Hindu calendars
- Vikram Samvat: −212 – −211
- Shaka Samvat: N/A
- Kali Yuga: 2832–2833
- Holocene calendar: 9732
- Iranian calendar: 890 BP – 889 BP
- Islamic calendar: 917 BH – 916 BH
- Javanese calendar: N/A
- Julian calendar: N/A
- Korean calendar: 2065
- Minguo calendar: 2180 before ROC 民前2180年
- Nanakshahi calendar: −1736
- Seleucid era: 43/44 AG
- Thai solar calendar: 274–275
- Tibetan calendar: ལྕགས་མོ་ཡོས་ལོ་ (female Iron-Hare) −142 or −523 or −1295 — to — ཆུ་ཕོ་འབྲུག་ལོ་ (male Water-Dragon) −141 or −522 or −1294

Year 269 BC was a year of the pre-Julian Roman calendar. At the time it was known as the Year of the Consulship of Gallus and Pictor (or, less frequently, year 485 Ab urbe condita). The denomination 269 BC for this year has been used since the early medieval period, when the Anno Domini calendar era became the prevalent method in Europe for naming years.

== Events ==
=== By place ===
==== Sicily ====
- The Mamertines, a body of Campanian mercenaries who have been employed by Agathocles, the former tyrant of Syracuse, capture the stronghold of Messana (Messina in north-eastern Sicily), from which they harass the Syracusans. The Syracusan military leader, Hieron, defeats them in a pitched battle at the Longanus River near Mylae, but Carthaginian forces intervene to prevent him from capturing Messana. His grateful countrymen then choose Hieron as their king and tyrant, to be known as Hieron II.

== Births ==
- Attalus I Soter, ruler of Pergamon, from 241 to 197 BC. He will be the first of the Attalid dynasty to assume the title of king (d. 197 BC).
