= Grammichele =

- Comune
- Comune di Grammichele
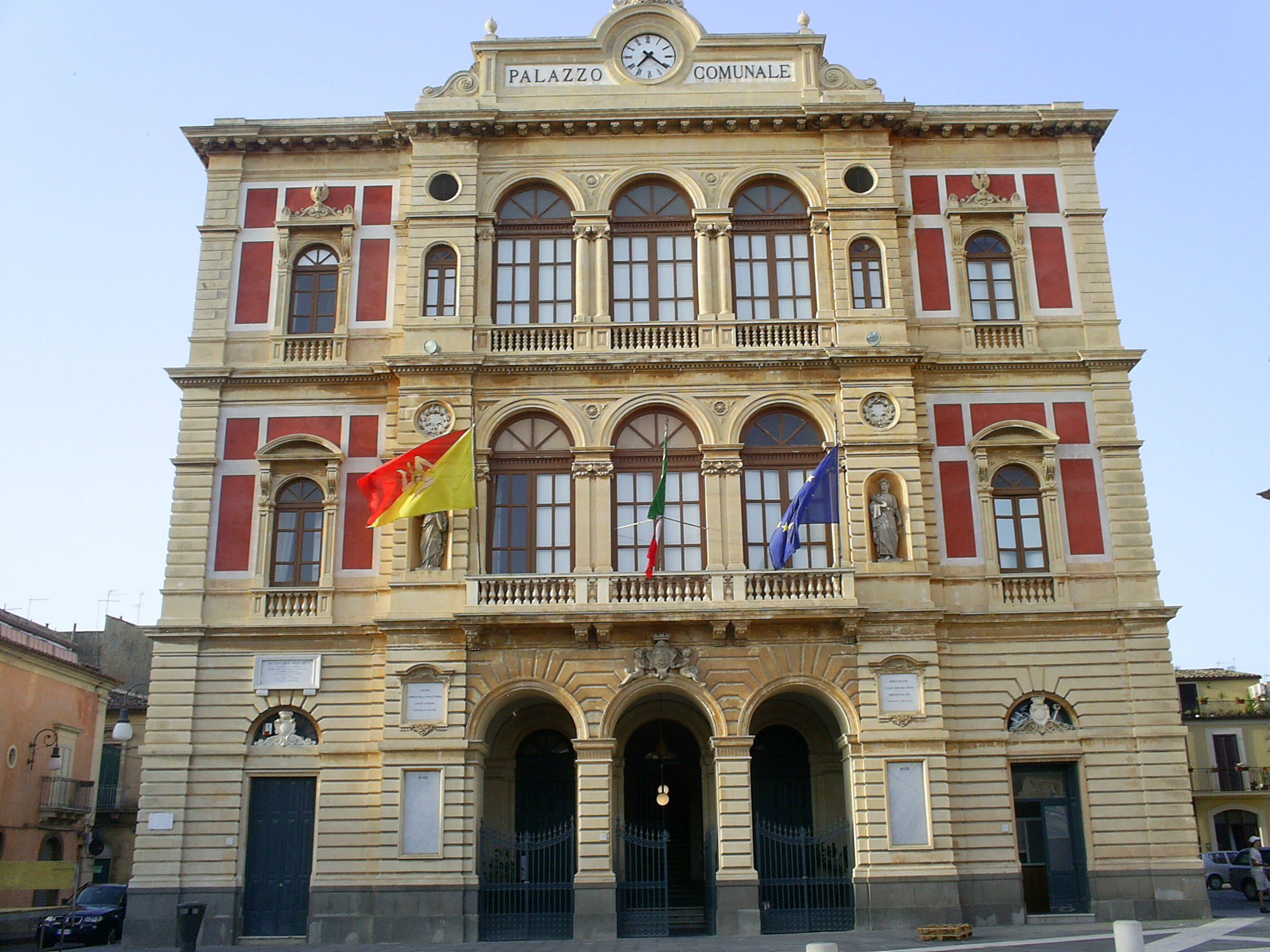

- Coat of arms

- Location within Italy Location within Sicily
- Coordinates: 37°12′53″N 14°38′11″E
- Country: Italy
- Region: Sicily
- Metropolitan city: Catania (CT)

Government
  - Mayor: Giuseppe Maria Purpora

Area
  - Total: 31.02 km^{2} (11.98 sq mi)
- Elevation: 520 m (1,710 ft)

Population (2025)
  - Total: 12,292
  - Density: 396.3/km^{2} (1,026/sq mi)
- Demonym: Grammichelesi
- Time zone: UTC+1 (CET)
  - Summer (DST): UTC+2 (CEST)
- Postal code: 95042
- Dialing code: 0933
- Patron saint: St. Michael Archangel
- Saint day: 8 May
- Website: www.comune.grammichele.ct.it/hh/index.php

Grammichele (Sicilian: Grammicheli; Ancient Greek: Echetle, lit. 'plowshare'; Latin: Echetla, later Ochula; Medieval Latin: Occhiolà) is a town and comune in the Metropolitan City of Catania in Sicily, southern Italy. It is located at the feet of the Hyblaean Mountains, some 13 kilometres (8 mi) from Caltagirone. It has a population of 12,292 as of 2025.

== History ==
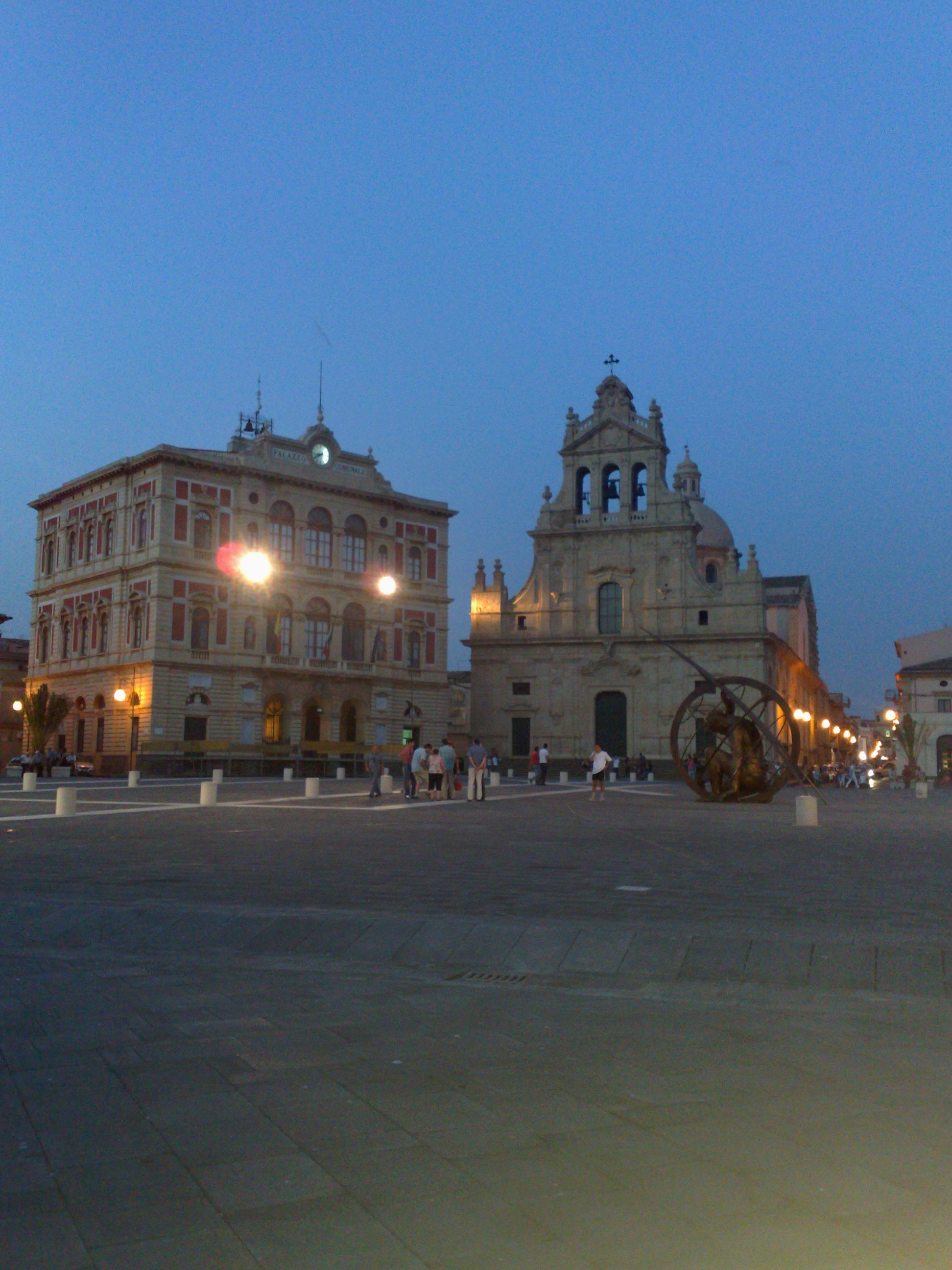
Piazza Carafa in the center of the town, Palazzo Communale and San Michele Arcangelo

The town was built in 1693, after the old town of Occhiolà, located to the north of the modern Grammichele, was destroyed by an earthquake. Occhiolà, on account of the similarity of name, is generally identified with Echetla, a frontier city between Syracusan and Carthaginian territory in the time of Hiero II, which appears to have been originally a Sicel city in which Greek civilization prevailed from the 5th century onwards.

The devastation of the old town was so severe that the feudal landlord of the town, Carlo Maria Carafa Branciforte, Prince of Butari, commissioned construction of a new town, with plans aided by Michele da Ferla. Supposedly the Prince himself sketched out the initial hexagonal layout. In the center of the hexagon is the Piazza Carlo Maria Carafa, faced by the Chiesa Madre (Mother Church), San Michele Arcangelo, and the Palazzo Communale (City Hall). The town of Avola, destroyed by the same earthquake, was also relocated and rebuilt along a hexagonal layout.

On 15 July 1943, the 1st Canadian Infantry Division fought its first battle in the Allied invasion of Sicily against elements of the German Panzer Division "Hermann Göring". The Hastings and Prince Edward Regiment, Saskatoon Light Infantry (Machine Gun) and the Three Rivers Regiment (tank) all took part in the fighting, which concluded at midday with the town in Canadian hands.

== Demographics ==
As of 2025, Grammichele has a population of 12,292, of whom 49.0% are male and 51.0% are female, comparable to the nationwide average of 49.0% and 51.0% respectively. Minors make up 16.7% of the population, and seniors make up 25.0%, compared to the Italian average of 14.9% and 24.7% respectively.

Historical population

Year	Pop.	±%
1861	10,392	—
1871	10,319	−0.7%
1881	11,872	+15.0%
1901	15,017	+26.5%
1911	20,316	+35.3%
1921	27,003	+32.9%
1931	13,393	−50.4%
1936	14,014	+4.6%

Year	Pop.	±%
1951	14,210	+1.4%
1961	14,486	+1.9%
1971	12,286	−15.2%
1981	13,668	+11.2%
1991	13,609	−0.4%
2001	13,395	−1.6%
2011	13,064	−2.5%
2021	12,566	−3.8%

Source: ISTAT

=== Immigration ===
As of 2024, the foreign-born population is 1,207, equal to 9.8% of the population. The 5 largest foreign nationalities are the Swiss (291), Romanians (223), Albanians (222), Germans (128) and Senegalese (37).

== Main sights ==
To the east of Grammichele a cave shrine of Demeter, with fine votive terracottas, was discovered. Other sights include the Mother Church; San Michele Arcangelo, dedicated to St. Michael; and the Church of Calvary.

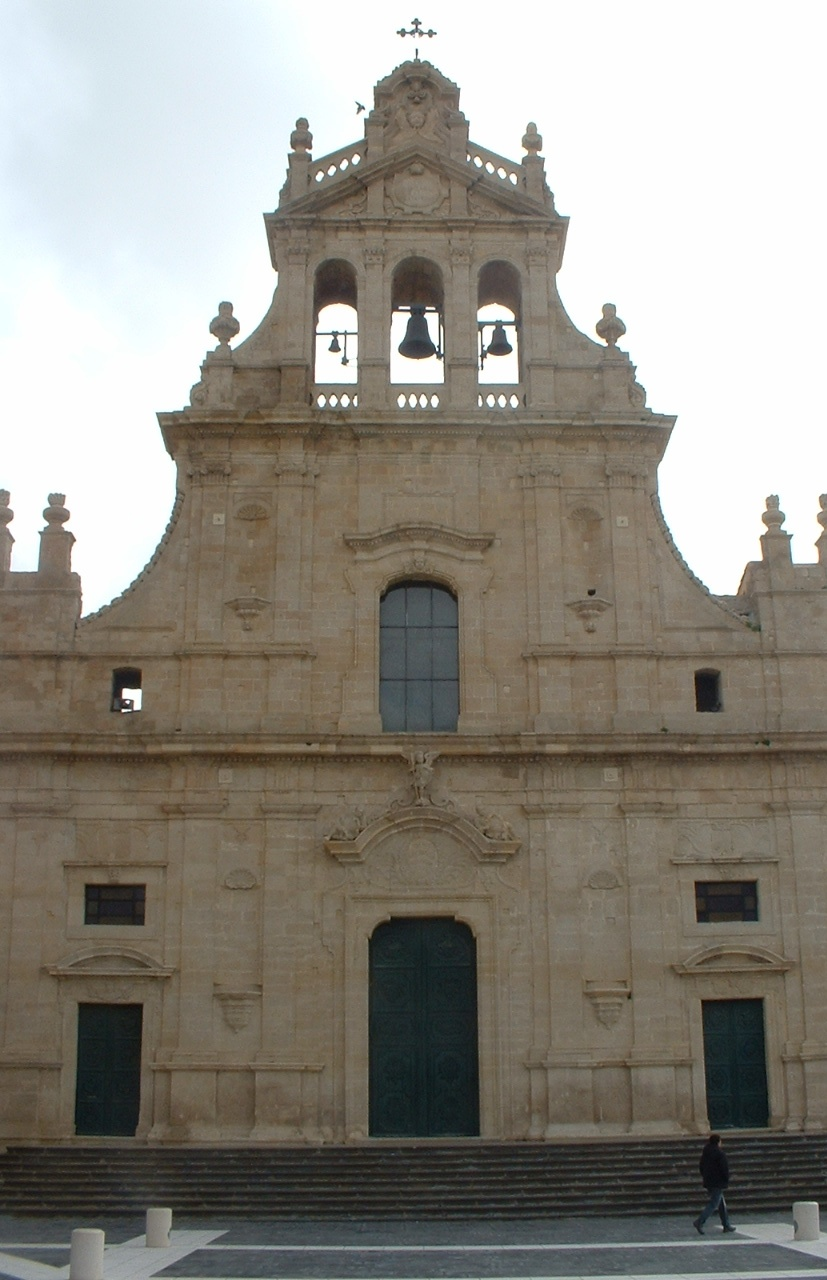
Saint Michael's church

== Notable people ==
- Francesco Gargano (1899–1975), an Italian fencer who won a gold medal in the team sabre event at the 1920 Summer Olympics.
- Agrippino Manteo (1884–1947), a Catanese-American puppeteer who immigrated first to Mendoza, Argentina, and then to New York City, where he performed Sicilian puppet theater plays on a daily basis from the early 1920s until he closed his theater in 1939. <Cavallo, Jo Ann. The Sicilian Puppet Theater of Agrippino Manteo (1884-1947): The Paladins of France in America. Anthem Press, 2023. >
