= 263 BC =

263 BC in various calendars
Gregorian calendar	263 BC; CCLXIII BC
Ab urbe condita	491
Ancient Egypt era	XXXIII dynasty, 61
Pharaoh	Ptolemy II Philadelphus, 21
Ancient Greek Olympiad (summer)	129th Olympiad, year 2
Assyrian calendar	4488
Balinese saka calendar	N/A
Bengali calendar	−856 – −855
Berber calendar	688
Buddhist calendar	282
Burmese calendar	−900
Byzantine calendar	5246–5247
Chinese calendar	丁酉年 (Fire Rooster); 2435 or 2228 — to — 戊戌年 (Earth Dog); 2436 or 2229
Coptic calendar	−546 – −545
Discordian calendar	904
Ethiopian calendar	−270 – −269
Hebrew calendar	3498–3499
- Hindu calendars
Vikram Samvat	−206 – −205
Shaka Samvat	N/A
Kali Yuga	2838–2839
Holocene calendar	9738
Iranian calendar	884 BP – 883 BP
Islamic calendar	911 BH – 910 BH
Javanese calendar	N/A
Julian calendar	N/A
Korean calendar	2071
Minguo calendar	2174 before ROC 民前2174年
Nanakshahi calendar	−1730
Seleucid era	49/50 AG
Thai solar calendar	280–281
Tibetan calendar	མེ་མོ་བྱ་ལོ་ (female Fire-Bird) −136 or −517 or −1289 — to — ས་ཕོ་ཁྱི་ལོ་ (male Earth-Dog) −135 or −516 or −1288

Year 263 BC was a year of the pre-Julian Roman calendar. At the time it was known as the Year of the Consulship of Mesella and Crassus (or, less frequently, year 491 Ab urbe condita). The denomination 263 BC for this year has been used since the early medieval period, when the Anno Domini calendar era became the prevalent method in Europe for naming years.

== Events ==
=== By place ===
==== Roman Republic ====
- The Romans under the consul Manius Valerius Messalla secure the alliance of Hiero II of Syracuse. The treaty with Rome restricts Hiero's kingdom to southeast Sicily and the eastern coast of Sicily as far as Tauromenium. From this date until his death, Hiero remains loyal to the Romans.
- The Romans capture Catania in Sicily under Messalla. A sundial is part of the booty, which is placed in the Comitium in Rome and will be significant in Roman timekeeping.

==== Greece ====
- Alexander II of Epirus attacks and conquers the greater part of Macedonia. However, he is then driven out of both Macedonia and Epirus by Demetrius II, the son of King Antigonus II Gonatas of Macedonia.
- The Athenians and Spartans, worn down by several years of war and the devastation of their lands, make peace with Antigonus II of Macedonia who thus retains his hold on southern Greece.
- Cleanthes succeeds Zeno of Citium in his Stoic School in Athens.

==== Asia Minor ====
- Eumenes I succeeds his uncle Philetaerus on the throne of Pergamum. As Philetaerus is a eunuch, he adopts his nephew Eumenes (the son of Philetaerus' brother also named Eumenes) as his successor.

==== China ====
- General Bai Qi of the State of Qin captures the Han province of Nan, thereby cutting off Shangdang Commandery from the rest of the Han state. This commandery subsequently surrenders itself to the State of Zhao rather than transfer to Qin control, which will set up the climactic Battle of Changping in 260 BC.

== Births ==
- Antigonus III Doson, king of Macedonia from 229 to 221 BC (d. 221 BC)

== Deaths ==
- Philetaerus, founder (reigned from 282 BC) of the Attalid kingdom of Pergamum, in northwest Asia Minor (b. c. 343 BC)
- Qingxiang of Chu, Chinese king of Chu (Warring States Period)
