= Marcus Fulvius Flaccus =

Marcus Fulvius Flaccus was the name of several Romans, including:

- Marcus Fulvius Flaccus (consul 264 BC)
- Marcus Fulvius Flaccus (consul 125 BC)

== See also ==
- Fulvius or Fulvia gens, for other members of the gens
- Flaccus, on the cognomen
