= Lucius Postumius Megellus =

Lucius Postumius Megellus may refer to:

- Lucius Postumius Megellus (consul 305 BC), a consul in 305 BC, 294 BC, and 291 BC
- Lucius Postumius Megellus (consul 262 BC), consul in 262 BC, commanded at the Battle of Agrigentum
