= Battle of Agrigentum =

262 BC naval battle between Carthage and Rome

- Part of the First Punic War
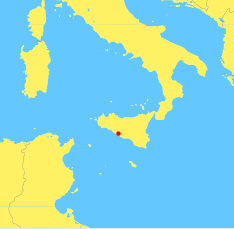
- Map of central Mediterranean Sea, showing location of Agrigentum (modern Agrigento)
Date	262 BC
Location	Agrigentum 37.3167°N 13.5833°E
Result	Roman victory
Territorial changes	Agrigentum captured by Rome

Belligerents
Roman Republic	Carthage

Commanders and leaders
Lucius Postumius Megellus; Quintus Mamilius Vitulus	Hanno; Hannibal Gisco

Strength
40,000–100,000 soldiers and laborers	31,500–56,000 men: 30,000–50,000 infantry; 1,500–6,000 cavalry; 30–60 war elephants; Agrigentum garrison

Casualties and losses
15,000–30,540 dead: 15,000–30,000 infantry; 540 cavalry	7,200: 3,000 infantry killed; 200 cavalry killed; 4,000 men captured; 8 elephants killed; 33 elephants wounded; 25,000 enslaved

The Battle of Agrigentum (Sicily, 262 BC) was the first pitched battle of the First Punic War and the first large-scale military confrontation between Carthage and the Roman Republic. The battle was fought after a long siege which started in 262 BC and resulted both in a Roman victory and the beginning of Roman control of Sicily.

== City ==
Agrigentum is a city on the island of Sicily, two and a half miles (4.0 kilometres) from the southern coast. It is on a plateau, surrounded by steep slopes on all sides except the west. The city was protected by the Hypsas River (Drago) to the west and the Akragas River to the east. The natural barriers meant the only way to attack the city was from the west, making the city easily defensible. The city commanded a main route along the southern coast and also routes leading northwards and eastwards to other cities. The major status of Agrigentum meant that it was a target for invading forces, and in 262 BC the Romans attacked the city to prevent the Carthaginians from holding it and using it as a staging ground for an attack on Rome.

== Prelude to the Siege of Agrigentum ==
In 288 BC, the Mamertines, Italian mercenaries that were hired to attack the Carthaginians, went to the city of Messana to protect it but instead massacred its men, took the land, and forced the women to become their wives. They then used the city as a base of operations for raiding neighboring cities. Hiero II, then leader of Syracuse, campaigned against the Mamertines. At some time between 268 and 265, Hiero II decisively defeated the Mamertines at the Longanus River, which caused the Mamertines to appeal to Carthage and Rome, the other major powers in the region besides Syracuse, for military aid. A Carthaginian commander in Sicily responded and sent a small force to garrison Messana’s citadel. Hiero II did not want openly to attack the Carthaginians and invite a war, so he retreated back to Syracuse.

Carthage had already been trying to control Sicily for centuries, and their main opposition had been the Greek colonies spread around the island. Syracuse, the wealthiest and most powerful of the Greek colonies in Sicily, had always been Carthage's main opposition. Taking control of Messana allowed Carthage to decrease Syracuse's power, and since Carthage already controlled North Africa, parts of Spain, Sardinia, and some small islands in the Mediterranean, control of Messana could lead to the conquest of Sicily. Additionally, Messana was an excellent staging area if the Carthaginians wanted to invade Italy and attack Rome.

While the Romans had been steadily expanding their territory for over a century, their army had never fought a battle outside of the Italian Peninsula. Carthage's control of an invasion route into Italy threatened Rome's newly conquered territory in southern Italy as well as Rome itself. In 264 BC, the Roman Senate voted to send an expedition to Sicily under the command of Appius Claudius Caudex, one of the consuls for that year. Whether the Centuriate Assembly of Rome formally declared war is disputed. Adrian Goldsworthy has maintained that it was highly unlikely, and that, although the Romans knew war with Syracuse was almost a certainty, they believed their military would deter or swiftly defeat any opposition in Sicily.

The Romans intended to send two legions to Sicily in 262 BC, and were probably willing to negotiate peace with Carthage. Since 264 BC, when they had declared war on Carthage, there had not been much serious fighting between the two except for a small battle in the straits of Messana. Eventually, in 264 BC, the Romans took Messana and defeated the Syracusan and Carthaginian armies around the town. In 263 BC, the Syracusans, who had initially opposed the Roman takeover of Messana, made peace with them and began supplying their troops. Following the defection of Syracuse, several small Carthaginian dependencies switched to the Romans. The Carthaginians made conciliatory gestures at the start of the war, but by 262 BC, they started to increase their forces in Sicily. Once the Carthaginians started increasing their forces on the island, the Romans sent consuls there. The consuls were the generals of the Roman army, and with them came several legions. The Carthaginians hired Ligurian, Celtic, and Spanish mercenaries to encourage their enemies in Sicily to attack the Romans on the half of the island which the Romans controlled. After the loss of Messana and the arrival of numerous Carthaginian reinforcements, Agrigentum became the main base of operations for the Carthaginian military on the island.

The Carthaginians began sending forces to Sardinia using sea power, but most of their army was in Sicily. It seemed that they planned to use the island as a base for attacks on Italy. The Roman consuls, Lucius Postumius Megellus and Quintus Mamilius Vitulus focused their forces on Agrigentum. The consuls commanded a combined force of 40,000 men. Hannibal Gisco, the commander of Agrigentum and the son of Gisgo, gathered many of the people who lived in the area surrounding the city behind the city walls, swelling the population of the city to about 50,000; his garrison was relatively small. Hannibal refused to fight outside the city walls, which the Romans might have seen as a sign of weakness. The Romans then set up their camp about a mile from the city and harvested the crops from the area.

== Siege ==
Hannibal finally attacked the Romans while they were harvesting the crops in the fields. The Romans, outnumbered and unarmed, fled the area. The picket guarding their camp was the Romans' only fortification, and although they lost many men, they were able to defeat another Carthaginian contingent that was attempting to penetrate the camp. This first skirmish made Hannibal realise that he could not afford to lose any more men. He became increasingly reluctant to attack again, and the Romans realised they had underestimated their enemy.

The Roman consuls realised that they had to cut off Agrigentum from the outside world and blockade the city to cause starvation in order to force its inhabitants to surrender. The Romans began digging a system of ditches and small forts surrounding the city to prevent the inhabitants from preparing for the siege. The consuls divided their forces, with one force near the Temple of Asklepios to the south of the city and the other force stationed to the west of the city. There was a stalemate for five months until November 262 BC when supplies began to run out in Agrigentum. Hannibal became increasingly concerned over the limited resources, so he sent urgent messages to Carthage appealing for help. Carthage sent a relief force from Africa commanded by Hanno, whom historians believe to have been the son of Hannibal. There are varying accounts as to the details of Hanno’s army. Polybius, the Greek historian, stated that there were about 50 elephants, Numidian cavalry, and mercenaries. Diodoros, another historian, wrote there were 50,000 infantry, 6,000 cavalry, and 60 elephants. Yet another historian, Orosius refers to 30,000 infantry, 1,500 cavalry, and 30 elephants.

Hanno first advanced and concentrated his troops at Heraclea Minoa, about 25 miles (40 kilometres) west of Agrigentum. Hanno managed to capture the Roman supply base at Herbesos, causing shortages in supplies in the Roman camp, which led to disease and privation. This seizure of the Roman supplies also cut off the Roman lines of communication. Hanno then marched on, telling his Numidian cavalry to attack the Roman cavalry and then feign retreat. The Romans pursued the Numidians as they retreated and were brought to the main Carthaginian column. The Romans suffered many losses. Hanno then took a position on Toros (Torus), a hill about a mile from the Romans camp, where further skirmishes took place for two months, causing the siege to last from six to seven months.

With Hanno camped outside their own camp, the Roman supply lines from Syracuse were no longer available. With their own army at risk of starvation, the consuls chose to offer battle. This time it was Hanno's turn to refuse, probably with the intention of defeating the Romans by hunger. Meanwhile, the situation inside Agrigentum after more than six months of siege was close to desperate. Hannibal, communicating with the outside by smoke signals, sent urgent pleas for relief, and Hanno was forced to accept a pitched battle. While there are several accounts giving details of the actual fighting, they are—as is common with ancient records—inconsistent and difficult to reconcile.

== Battle ==
The Greek historian Polybius says that for two months, the two enemies were stationed close together outside the city without any direct conflict. Hannibal, still in the city, was sending a constant flow of messages and fire-signals stressing the city’s food shortages and desertion of the enemy which caused Hanno to fight. The Romans, who were also close to starvation, accepted the fight. After a long struggle, the Romans killed most of the Carthaginians; the Carthaginians lost 3,000 infantry and 200 cavalry killed, as well as 4,000 prisoners and eight elephants killed and 33 disabled. Throughout the whole siege, the Romans lost 30,000 infantry and 540 cavalry or more plausibly, one-third of their 40,000–50,000 troops. The high Roman losses and the escape of the Carthaginian army meant that no triumph was awarded for either consul.

Byzantine writer Zonaras wrote that Hanno deployed his army to battle but the Romans declined to fight because of the previous defeat of their cavalry. As food shortages became more severe, the consuls finally decided to fight, but Hanno was deterred by their confidence. Hanno originally wanted to co-ordinate his attack with Hannibal’s, but the Romans became aware of the plan. The Romans then ambushed the Carthaginian rear, so when Hanno attacked them, he was taken from both front and rear. The Romans also defeated an attack by the Carthaginian garrison.

A more likely version of the battle is that Hanno deployed the Carthaginian infantry in two lines, with the elephants and reinforcements in the second and the cavalry probably placed in the wings. The Romans battle plan is unknown but they typically organized in their triplex acies formation. All the sources agree that the fighting was long and that it was the Romans who managed to break the Carthaginian front. This provoked panic in the rear and the reserves fled the battlefield. It is also possible that the elephants also panicked and in their flight disorganized the Carthaginian formation. The Romans routed the enemy and were victorious. Their cavalry managed to attack the Carthaginian camp and capture several elephants. But this was not a complete success. Most of the enemy army fled and Hannibal Gisco, together with the garrison of Agrigentum, also managed to break the Roman line and escape for security.

No matter which of the three versions is correct, the Romans defeated the Carthaginians and forced Hanno to retreat. The night after the battle, Hannibal managed to escape Agrigentum with his mercenaries by filling the Roman trenches with straw. The next morning, the Romans pursued Hannibal and his garrison, and attacked the rear-guard, but eventually turned back to take control of Agrigentum. While seizing the city without opposition, they plundered the city and sold 25,000 inhabitants into slavery.

== Aftermath ==
Following this battle (the first among four pitched land battles fought in the First Punic War), the Romans occupied Agrigentum and sold the whole population into slavery. Though acts of brutality like this were commonplace, it proved counterproductive. It hardened the attitude of many other towns which might otherwise have proven friendly to Rome. The taking of Agrigentum was a significant victory for the Romans, although they came close to disaster on multiple occasions. Because Hannibal and his garrison managed to escape relatively unharmed, there was no Roman triumph for the two consuls, and it detracted from the success of the battle.

After 261 BC, Rome controlled most of Sicily and secured the grain harvest for its own use. This victory in the first large-scale campaign fought outside Italy gave the Romans extra confidence to pursue overseas interests.

== Bibliography ==
- Erdkamp, Paul (2015) [2011]. "Manpower and Food Supply in the First and Second Punic Wars". In Hoyos, Dexter (ed.). A Companion to the Punic Wars. Chichester, West Sussex: John Wiley. pp. 58–76. ISBN 978-1-119-02550-4.
- Goldsworthy, Adrian (2006). The Fall of Carthage: The Punic Wars 265–146 BC. London: Phoenix. ISBN 978-0-304-36642-2.
- Kern, Paul Bentley (1999). Ancient Siege Warfare. Bloomington and Indianapolis: Indiana University Press. ISBN 978-0285635241.
- Lazenby, John Francis (1996). The First Punic War: A Military History. Stanford, California: Stanford University Press. ISBN 0-8047-2673-6. OCLC 34371250.
- Warmington, Brian (1993) [1960]. Carthage. New York: Barnes & Noble, Inc. ISBN 978-1-56619-210-1.
