= Manius Otacilius Crassus =

Roman general and statesman, consul in 263 and 246 BCE

Manius Otacilius Crassus was a Roman statesman and general of Samnite origins who served during the middle era of the Roman Republic. He was one of the two consuls of 263 BCE, serving with Manius Valerius Maximus Corvinus Messalla. During their consulship they fought in the First Punic War on Sicily. Their first campaign was against Syracuse; Hieron of Syracuse negotiated terms (paying an indemnity, supporting Rome's war effort against Carthage, but remaining independent). They then marched against the Carthaginians; receiving the surrender of several Greek communities who were previously aligned with Carthage. He was consul for the second time in 246 BCE, serving with Marcus Fabius Licinus.

== See also ==
- Otacilia gens
- First Punic War
- Hieron of Syracuse

Political offices
Preceded by Appius Claudius Caudex; Marcus Fulvius Flaccus	Consul of the Roman Republic with Manius Valerius Maximus Messalla; 263 BC	Succeeded by Lucius Postumius Megellus; Quintus Mamilius Vitulus
Preceded by Lucius Caecilius Metellus; Numerus Fabius Buteo	Consul of the Roman Republic with Marcus Fabius Licinus; 246 BC	Succeeded by Marcus Fabius Buteo; Gaius Atilius Bulbus
