= Flaccus =

Roman cognomen

Flaccus was a cognomen of the ancient Roman plebeian family Fulvius, considered one of the most illustrious gentes of the city. Cicero and Pliny the Elder state that the family was originally from Tusculum, and that members still lived there in the 1st century.

As usual for cognomina, "Flaccus" was likely originally a nickname, probably of Marcus Fulvius Flaccus, the founder of the family. The etymology of "Flaccus" is unknown, but it is similar to other adjectives describing deformities of the body, like brocc(h)us (buck-toothed), lippus (blear-eyed), etc. It has been variously interpreted as meaning "big ears", "flop ears", "lop-eared", "floppy", or "fatty".

Flaccus was also a cognomen for a branch of the patrician Valerii and others.

== Fulvii ==
- Marcus Fulvius Flaccus, consul 264 BC
- Quintus Fulvius M.f. Flaccus, consul 237 BC, 224 BC, 212 BC, 209 BC
- Gnaeus Fulvius Flaccus, brother of Q. Fulvius, convicted of cowardice against Hannibal in 212 BC and exiled to Tarquinii
- Q. Fulvius Cn.f. Flaccus, suffect consul 180 BC
- Quintus Fulvius Q.f. Flaccus, consul 179 BC
- Servius Fulvius Flaccus, consul 135 BC
- Gaius Fulvius Flaccus, consul 134 BC
- Marcus Fulvius Flaccus, consul 125 BC, ally of the Gracchi

== Valerii ==
- Lucius Valerius M.f. Flaccus, consul 261 BC
- Publius Valerius L.f. Flaccus, consul 227 BC
- Lucius Valerius Flaccus, consul with Cato 195 BC
- Lucius Valerius Flaccus, consul 152 BC
- Lucius Valerius Flaccus, consul 131 BC
- Lucius Valerius Flaccus, consul 100 BC
- Lucius Valerius Flaccus, suffect consul 86 BC
- Gaius Valerius Flaccus, consul 93 BC
- Lucius Valerius Flaccus, urban praetor 63 BC
- Gaius Valerius Flaccus (1st century), poet

== Others ==
- Flaccus, original tibicen for the works of Terence (fl. 166–160 BC)
- Quintus Horatius Flaccus (Horace)
- Gaius Norbanus Flaccus (consul 38 BC), consul 38 BC
- Gaius Norbanus Flaccus (consul 24 BC), consul 24 BC
- Gaius Norbanus Flaccus (consul 15 AD), consul 15 AD
- Marcus Verrius Flaccus, freedman scholar
- Lucius Pomponius Flaccus, consul AD 17
- Aulus Avilius Flaccus, prefect of Egypt AD 32, written about by Philo
- Aulus Persius Flaccus (34-62), poet
- Marcus Hordeonius Flaccus, commander of the Rhine legions during the Batavian rebellion, killed AD 70
- C. Bellicius Flaccus Torquatus Tebanianus, ordinary consul 124
- C. Bellicius Flaccus Torquatus, ordinary consul 143, and son of the consul of 124.
- Quintus Volusius Flaccus Cornelianus, consul 174
- Alcuin, nicknamed "Flaccus"

== Sources ==
- Parker, Holt N. (2000). "Flaccus". The Classical Quarterly. 50 (2): 455–462. doi:10.1093/cq/50.2.455. ISSN 0009-8388.
