= Valerius Flaccus =

Valerius Flaccus is the name of:

- Valerius Flaccus (poet) (died 1st century), Latin poet at the time of Vespasian
- a number of Roman political figures, including:
  - Lucius Valerius Flaccus (consul 261 BC)
  - Lucius Valerius Flaccus (consul 195 BC)
  - Lucius Valerius Flaccus (princeps senatus 86 BC), consul 100 BC
  - Gaius Valerius Flaccus (consul), a cousin of the preceding man
  - Lucius Valerius Flaccus (suffect consul 86 BC), brother of the consul in 93 BC
  - Lucius Valerius Flaccus (praetor 63 BC), son of Lucius Valerius Flaccus (suffect consul 86 BC)

== See also ==
- Lucius Valerius Flaccus (disambiguation)
