= Otacilia gens =

Ancient Roman family

The gens Otacilia, originally Octacilia, was a plebeian family at ancient Rome. The gens first rose to prominence during the First Punic War, but afterwards lapsed into obscurity. The first of the family to obtain the consulship was Manius Otacilius Crassus, in 263 BC.

== Origin ==
The nomen Otacilius may be derived from the praenomen Octavius. Octacilius is the correct orthography, but Otacilius is the form most common in later sources. The earliest known member of the family was a native of Maleventum, an ancient city of Campania, which according to Pliny was inhabited by the Hirpini.

== Praenomina ==
The early Otacilii favored the praenomina Manius, Titus, and Gaius. The earliest known Otacilius bore the praenomen Numerius, which passed through his daughter to the Fabii. In later times, Gnaeus and Lucius are found.

== Branches and cognomina ==
The only family-names of the Otacilii are Crassus and Naso. Crassus was a common surname, meaning "dull, thick," or "solid." It could refer to appearance, demeanor, or intellect. Naso is thought to refer to a prominent nose.

== Members ==
This list includes abbreviated praenomina. For an explanation of this practice, see filiation.

- Numerius Otacilius Maleventanus, a wealthy native of Maleventum in the first half of the 5th century BC.
- Otacilia N. f., married Quintus Fabius Vibulanus.
- Gnaeus Otacilius Naso, recommended by Cicero to the notice and favor of Manius Acilius Caninus in 46 BC.
- Lucius Otacilius Pilitus, a freedman, who opened a school at Rome, where he taught rhetoric, in 81 BC. Amongst his pupils was Gnaeus Pompeius, and Otacilius wrote a history of his pupil, and of his father, Pompeius Strabo.
- Marcus Otacilius Catulus, consul suffectus in AD 88.
- (Otacilius) Severus or Severianus, the father-in-law or brother-in-law of Marcus Julius Philippus, emperor from AD 244 to 249, by whom Severus was appointed Governor of Mesopotamia (Roman province) and Moesia.
- Marcia Otacilia Severa, wife of Philip the Arab, and Roman empress from AD 244 to 249.

=== Otacilii Crassi ===
- Manius Otacilius Crassus, grandfather of the consuls of 263 and 261 BC.
- Gaius Otacilius M'. f. Crassus, father of the consuls of 263 and 261 BC.
- Manius Otacilius C. f. M'. n. Crassus, consul in 263 BC, during the First Punic War. He crossed into Sicily with a large army, and concluded a peace with Syracuse. He was consul a second time in 246.
- Titus Otacilius C. f. M'. n. Crassus, consul in 261 BC, continued the war against the Carthaginians in Sicily.
- Titus Otacilius (T. f. C. n.) Crassus, praetor in 217 and 214 BC.
- Otacilia, condemned in a judgment of the jurist Gaius Aquillius Gallus, who was praetor in 67 BC. She may have been the wife of Marcus Juventius Laterensis; the phrase ab Otacilia Laterensi[s] occurs in Valerius Maximus.
- Otacilius Crassus, an officer in the army of Gnaeus Pompeius, he had the command of Lissus in Macedonia. He massacred two hundred and twenty of Caesar's soldiers, who had surrendered to him on the promise that they should be uninjured. Shortly afterward, he abandoned Lissus, and joined the main body of Pompeius' army.

== See also ==
- List of Roman gentes

== Bibliography ==
- Polybius, Historiae (The Histories).
- Marcus Tullius Cicero, Epistulae ad Familiares.
- Gaius Julius Caesar, Commentarii de Bello Civili (Commentaries on the Civil War).
- Valerius Maximus, Factorum ac Dictorum Memorabilium (Memorable Facts and Sayings).
- Gaius Plinius Secundus (Pliny the Elder), Naturalis Historia (Natural History).
- Gaius Suetonius Tranquillus, De Claris Rhetoribus (On the Eminent Orators).
- Aulus Gellius, Noctes Atticae (Attic Nights).
- Sextus Pompeius Festus, Epitome de M. Verrio Flacco de Verborum Significatu (Epitome of Marcus Verrius Flaccus: On the Meaning of Words).
- Eutropius, Breviarium Historiae Romanae (Abridgement of the History of Rome).
- Paulus Orosius, Historiarum Adversum Paganos (History Against the Pagans).
- Joannes Zonaras, Epitome Historiarum (Epitome of History).
- Gerardus Vossius, De Historicis Latinis (The Latin Historians), Jan Maire, Brittenburg (1627).
- Dictionary of Greek and Roman Biography and Mythology, William Smith, ed., Little, Brown and Company, Boston (1849).
- George Davis Chase, "The Origin of Roman Praenomina", in Harvard Studies in Classical Philology, vol. VIII (1897).
- D.P. Simpson, Cassell's Latin and English Dictionary, Macmillan Publishing Company, New York (1963).
- Michael Grant, The Roman Emperors, Scribner's (1985).
