= Hanno (Messana garrison commander) =

3rd century BC Carthaginian general

Hanno (Punic: 𐤇𐤍𐤀, ḤNʾ) was a Carthaginian general, prominent in the events leading to the start of the First Punic War (264 to 241 BC).

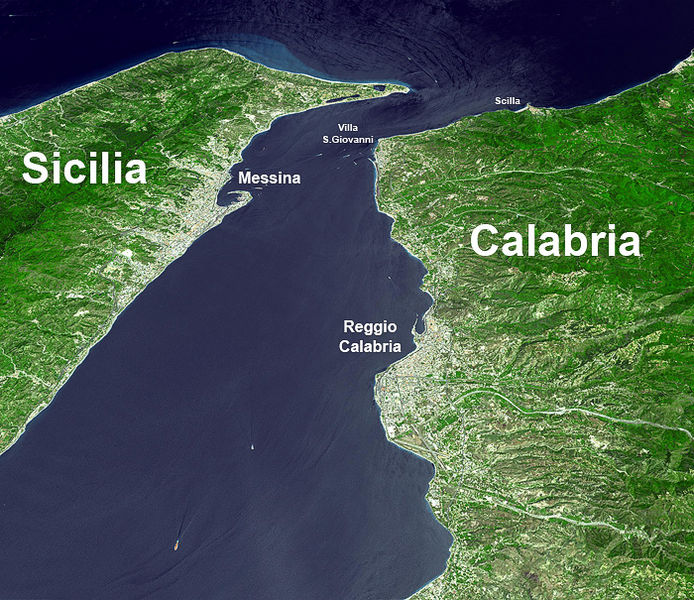
Satellite photo of the Strait of Messina.

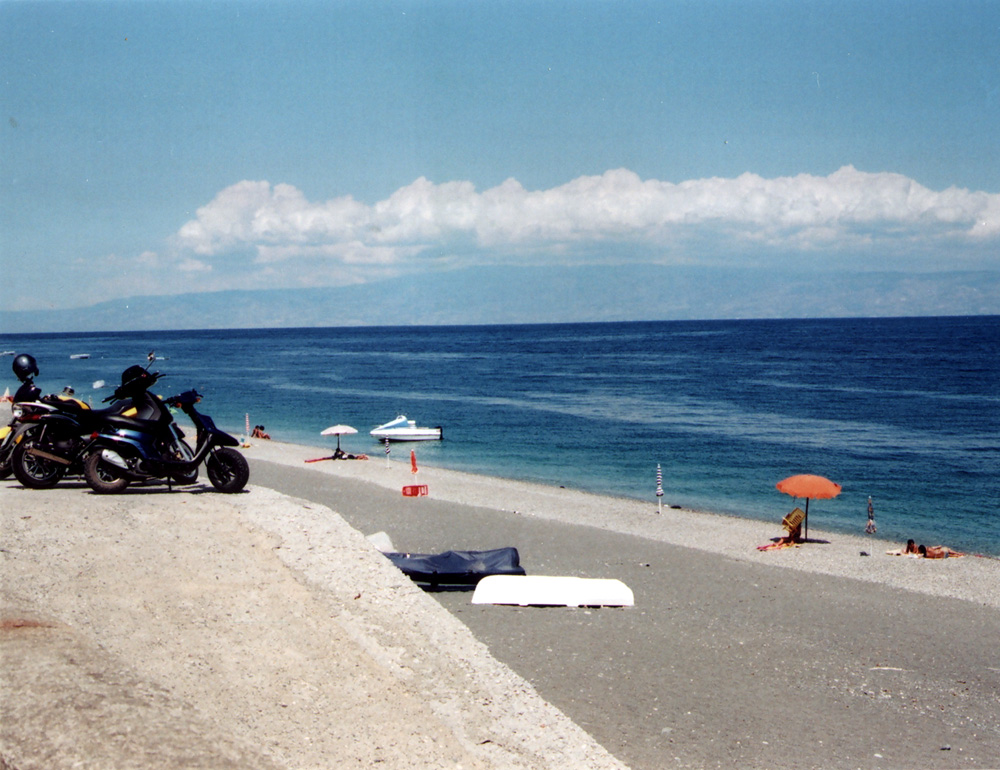
The Strait of Messina, the Italian mainland in the distance.

== Appeal for assistance from the Mamertines ==
In 265 BCE, the Mamertines who were occupying Messana were being threatened by Hiero II of Syracuse. Consequently, they sent appeals for assistance to Rome and Carthage. The Carthaginians were first to respond, dispatching a small force commanded by Hanno to occupy the citadel of Messana and patrol the strait of Messina. The Roman consul Appius Claudius Caudex, desiring personal glory, persuaded the Roman People with promises of profit to vote in favour of intervening in Messana. Gaius Claudius, a military tribune, was sent in advance by the consul Appius Claudius Caudex with a few ships to Rhegium, a city allied to the Romans on the opposite side of the strait, on the Italian mainland.

== Expulsion from Messana ==
Gaius Claudius commenced negotiations with Hanno, but negotiations must have broken down and Gaius unsuccessfully tried to force passage across the strait, in the process losing some triremes to the skillful Carthaginian sailors. Hanno, understanding the gravity of the situation and not wanting to be blamed for starting a war with the Romans, as a gesture returned the captured vessels to the Romans and urged them to opt for peace. Gaius Claudius, it would seem, ignored the gesture and tried again to cross the strait to Messana; this time successfully. The Mamertines urged Hanno to descend from the citadel and parley with the Romans. Hanno reluctantly agreed, but the talks failed again. The Romans seized Hanno and imprisoned him. Hanno was thus compelled to withdraw the Carthaginian garrison from Messana. These events triggered the beginning of the First Punic War.

== Death ==
The Carthaginians subsequently crucified Hanno for what was regarded as cowardice and lack of judgement in leaving the citadel of Messana.

== See also ==
- Other Hannos in Carthaginian history
