= 262 BC =

262 BC in various calendars
- Gregorian calendar: 262 BC; CCLXII BC
- Ab urbe condita: 492
- Ancient Egypt era: XXXIII dynasty, 62
- Pharaoh: Ptolemy II Philadelphus, 22
- Ancient Greek Olympiad (summer): 129th Olympiad, year 3
- Assyrian calendar: 4489
- Balinese saka calendar: N/A
- Bengali calendar: −855 – −854
- Berber calendar: 689
- Buddhist calendar: 283
- Burmese calendar: −899
- Byzantine calendar: 5247–5248
- Chinese calendar: 戊戌年 (Earth Dog); 2436 or 2229 — to — 己亥年 (Earth Pig); 2437 or 2230
- Coptic calendar: −545 – −544
- Discordian calendar: 905
- Ethiopian calendar: −269 – −268
- Hebrew calendar: 3499–3500
- Hindu calendars
- Vikram Samvat: −205 – −204
- Shaka Samvat: N/A
- Kali Yuga: 2839–2840
- Holocene calendar: 9739
- Iranian calendar: 883 BP – 882 BP
- Islamic calendar: 910 BH – 909 BH
- Javanese calendar: N/A
- Julian calendar: N/A
- Korean calendar: 2072
- Minguo calendar: 2173 before ROC 民前2173年
- Nanakshahi calendar: −1729
- Seleucid era: 50/51 AG
- Thai solar calendar: 281–282
- Tibetan calendar: ས་ཕོ་ཁྱི་ལོ་ (male Earth-Dog) −135 or −516 or −1288 — to — ས་མོ་ཕག་ལོ་ (female Earth-Boar) −134 or −515 or −1287

Year 262 BC was a year of the pre-Julian Roman calendar. At the time it was known as the Year of the Consulship of Valerius and Otacilius (or, less frequently, year 492 Ab urbe condita). The denomination 262 BC for this year has been used since the early medieval period, when the Anno Domini calendar era became the prevalent method in Europe for naming years.

== Events ==
=== By place ===
==== Greece ====
- After Athens surrenders in the Chremonidean War following a long siege by Macedonian forces, Antigonus II Gonatas re-garrisons Athens and forbids the city from making war. Otherwise, he leaves Athens alone as the seat of philosophy and learning in Greece.

==== Roman Republic ====
- Rome besieges the city of Agrigentum which is held by Carthage under the command of Hannibal Gisco. Rome's siege involves both consular armies – a total of four Roman legions – and takes several months to resolve. The garrison of Agrigentum manages to call for reinforcements and a Carthaginian relief force commanded by Hanno comes to the rescue and destroys the Roman supply base at Erbessus. Nevertheless, after a few skirmishes, the battle of Agrigentum is fought and won by Rome, and the city falls. Gisco manages to escape to Carthage in the late stages of the battle.
- After the loss of Agrigentum, the Carthaginians retire to organise their fleet. In the meantime, the Romans sack Agrigentum and enslave its Greek inhabitants. The Romans are now determined to drive the Carthaginians out of Sicily.

==== Seleucid Empire ====
- Seleucid king Antiochus I's eldest son Seleucus, who has ruled in the east of the kingdom as viceroy for a number of years, is put to death by his father on the charge of rebellion.
- Antiochus I tries to break the growing power of Pergamum by force of arms. Eumenes I, the new ruler of Pergamum, liberates his city from the overlordship of the Seleucids by defeating the army of Antiochus I near Sardis (the capital of Lydia), and thereby establishing an independent city-state.
- Antiochus I dies and is succeeded by his second son Antiochus II Theos.

==== China ====
- Following the surrender of the Shangdang Commandery, formerly of Han, to the State of Zhao, fighting between Zhao and the State of Qin begins in the area of Changping.

== Births ==
- Apollonius of Perga (Pergaeus), Greek astronomer and mathematician specialising in geometry and noted for his writings on conic sections (d. c. 190 BC)

== Deaths ==
- Antiochus I Soter, king of the Seleucid Kingdom from 281 BC (b. c. 323 BC)
- Acrotatus II, Agiad king of Sparta
- Philemon, Athenian poet and playwright of the New Comedy (b. c. 362 BC)
- Zeno of Citium, Hellenistic Stoic philosopher from Citium, Cyprus (b. 333 BC)
