= Titus Otacilius Crassus =

Roman politician and general, consul in 261 BCE

Titus Otacilius Crassus was a Roman statesman and general during the middle era of the Roman Republic. He was one of the two consuls of 261 BCE, serving with Lucius Valerius Flaccus. During his consulship, he and his consular colleague Flaccus fought against the Carthaginians on Sicily as part of the ongoing First Punic War. Before sailing to Sicily they strengthened the coastal defences of Italy against attacks by Hannibal Gisco, a Carthaginian admiral sent to raid the Tyrrhenian coast. The consuls besieged Mytistraton, but were eventually driven off by Hamilcar, the new commander of Carthage's Sicilian army, who defeated them at Thermae near Palermo. They returned to Italy were they started building Rome's first warfleet, created after Carthaginian example. In 260, the fleet was ready and would be used by Gnaeus Cornelius Scipio Asina, one of the two consuls of that year.

== Modern Sources ==
- Thomas Robert Shannon Broughton: The Magistrates of the Roman Republic. Vol. 1, New York 1951, p. 204.
- Adrian Goldsworthy: The Fall of Carthage, 2000.

Political offices
Preceded by Lucius Postumius Megellus, and Quintus Mamilius Vitulus	Consul of the Roman Republic; 261 BC; With: Lucius Valerius Flaccus	Succeeded by Gnaeus Cornelius Scipio Asina, and Gaius Duilius
