= Philistis =

Wife of Hieron II

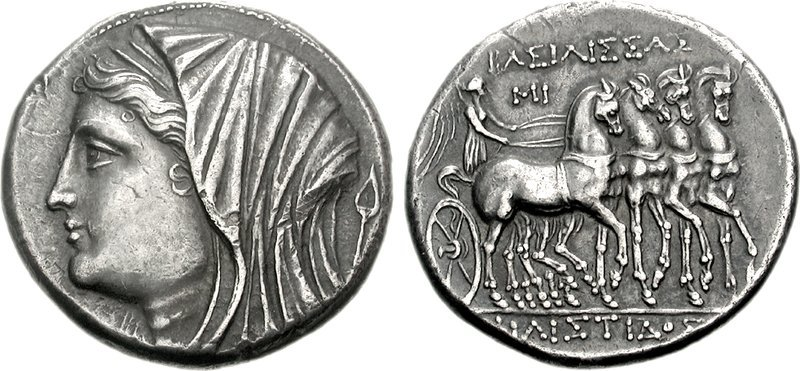
Syracusan coin with portrait of Philistis (left)

Philistis, the wife of Hieron II, was a queen of ancient Syracuse, Magna Graecia, known from her coins, which are numerous, and of fine workmanship, and from the occurrence of her name (bearing the title of queen, as it does also on her coins) in some Greek inscriptions on the stands of the theater of Tauromenium (Taormina). The circumstance that it is here associated with that of Nereis, the wife of Gelon II, as well as the style and fabric of the coins, which closely resemble those of Hieron II and his son, leads to the conclusion that these were struck during the long reign of Hieron II. The most probable conjecture is that Philistis was the wife of Hieron himself.
