= 261 BC =

261 BC in various calendars
| Gregorian calendar | 261 BC; CCLXI BC |
| Ab urbe condita | 493 |
| Ancient Egypt era | XXXIII dynasty, 63 |
| Pharaoh | Ptolemy II Philadelphus, 23 |
| Ancient Greek Olympiad (summer) | 129th Olympiad, year 4 |
| Assyrian calendar | 4490 |
| Balinese saka calendar | N/A |
| Bengali calendar | −854 – −853 |
| Berber calendar | 690 |
| Buddhist calendar | 284 |
| Burmese calendar | −898 |
| Byzantine calendar | 5248–5249 |
| Chinese calendar | 己亥年 (Earth Pig); 2437 or 2230 — to — 庚子年 (Metal Rat); 2438 or 2231 |
| Coptic calendar | −544 – −543 |
| Discordian calendar | 906 |
| Ethiopian calendar | −268 – −267 |
| Hebrew calendar | 3500–3501 |
- Hindu calendars
| Vikram Samvat | −204 – −203 |
| Shaka Samvat | N/A |
| Kali Yuga | 2840–2841 |
| Holocene calendar | 9740 |
| Iranian calendar | 882 BP – 881 BP |
| Islamic calendar | 909 BH – 908 BH |
| Javanese calendar | N/A |
| Julian calendar | N/A |
| Korean calendar | 2073 |
| Minguo calendar | 2172 before ROC 民前2172年 |
| Nanakshahi calendar | −1728 |
| Seleucid era | 51/52 AG |
| Thai solar calendar | 282–283 |
| Tibetan calendar | 阴土猪年 (female Earth-Pig) −134 or −515 or −1287 — to — 阳金鼠年 (male Iron-Rat) −133 or −514 or −1286 |

Year 261 BC was a year of the pre-Julian Roman calendar. At the time it was known as the Year of the Consulship of Flaccus and Crassus (or, less frequently, year 493 Ab urbe condita). The denomination 261 BC for this year has been used since the early medieval period, when the Anno Domini calendar era became the prevalent method in Europe for naming years.

== Events ==
=== By place ===
==== Roman Republic ====
- The Romans, determined to win control of Sicily from Carthage, build a fleet based on the model of a captured Carthaginian quinquereme.

==== Seleucid Empire ====
- The new Seleucid king Antiochus II reaches an agreement with the king of Macedonia, Antigonus II Gonatas, to work together in trying to push Ptolemy II's fleet and armies out of the Aegean Sea. With Macedonia's support, Antiochus II launches an attack on Ptolemaic outposts in Asia Minor.

==== India ====
- Mauryan Emperor Ashoka wages a war against the independent kingdom of Kalinga, culminating in the Battle of the Dhauli Hills. In the aftermath, Kalinga is annexed into the Mauryan Empire, but the brutality of the war is believed to have led to Ashoka's conversion to Buddhism, as described in his many Edicts of Ashoka.

==== China ====
- The armies of the State of Qin and State of Zhao contest control of the area around Changping. After suffering defeats to general Wang He of Qin and the superior Qin army, general Lian Po of Zhao refuses to give battle, resulting in a stalemate.

== Deaths ==
- Antiochus I Soter, Greek king of the Hellenistic Seleucid Empire (or 262 BC)
