= San Michele Arcangelo, Grammichele =

Church building in Italy

Coordinates: 37.2°N 14.5°E

San Michele Arcangelo is a Baroque architecture, Roman Catholic church, also known as the Chiesa Madre of the town of Grammichele in the region of Sicily, Italy.

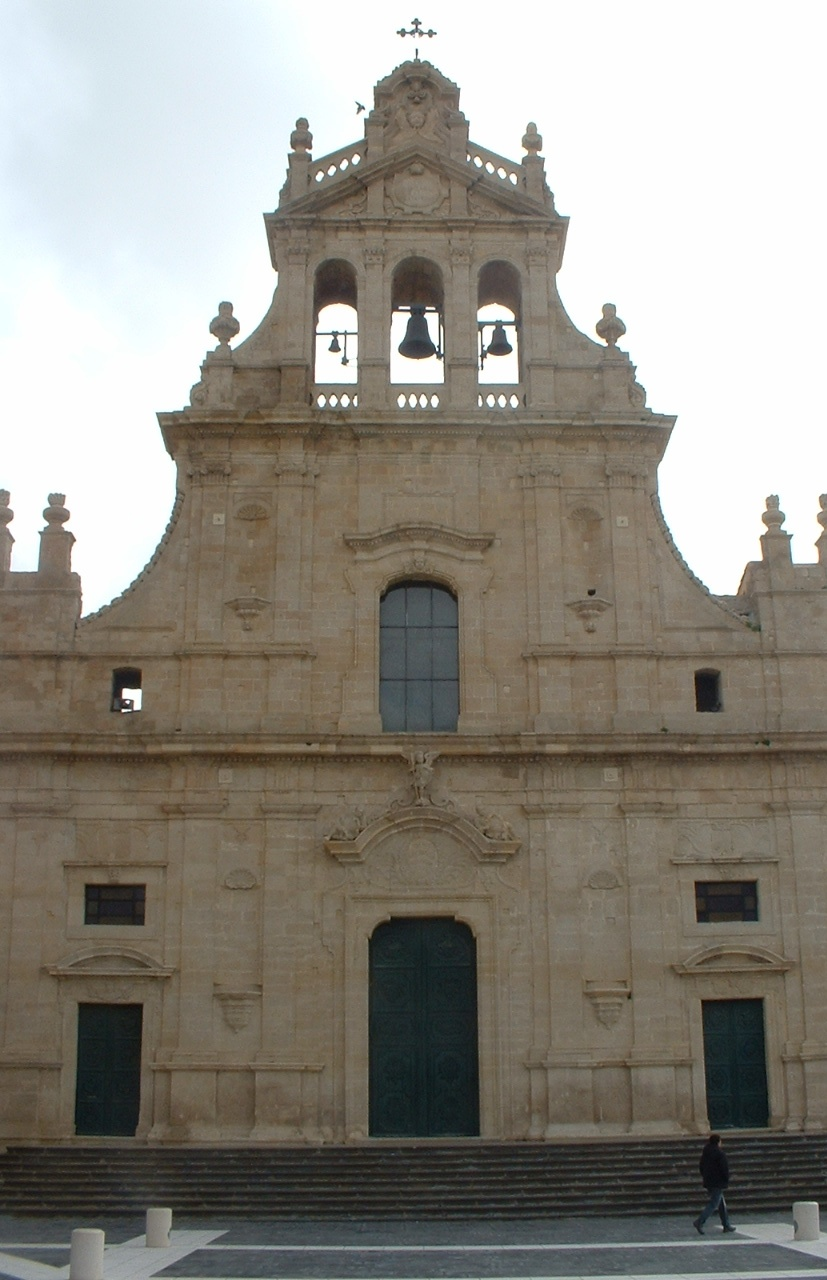
Saint Michael's church

== History and description ==
The entire town of Grammichele was relocated and rebuilt after the 1693 Sicily earthquake. This church was erected starting around 1724 and not completed until 1757, under the patronage of the comune and the heirs of Carlo Maria Carafa Branciforte, Prince of Butera. The architect Carlo Sada completed the superior portion of the facade and added the clock. The church is dedicated to St Michael Archangel, who along with St Catherine of Alexandria, is the patron of the town. St Michael is putatively the protector against earth quake. The interior has three naves, a transept, and a tall dome at the crossing. The interior is decorated with late-Baroque stuccoes and statues of the 12 apostles.

Among the altarpieces are the Dispute of St Catherine of Alexandria by an unknown author; and a St Michael with a standard of the Virgin.
