= Quintus Mamilius Vitulus =

Third Century BCE Roman statesman and general, consul in 262 BCE

Quintus Mamilius Vitulus was a Roman politician of the third century BC. He was brother of Lucius Mamilius Vitulus, consul in 265 BC.

According to tradition, his family, plebeian, was a native of the princely family of Tusculum.

In 262 BC, during the third year of the First Punic War, he was elected consul. With his colleague Lucius Postumius Megellus, he besieged the Sicilian city of Agrigentum and won a victory over a Carthaginian mercenary army which had come to relieve the city.

Political offices
Preceded by Manius Valerius Maximus Messalla; Manius Otacilius Crassus	Roman consul 262 BC with Lucius Postumius Megellus	Succeeded by Lucius Valerius Flaccus; Titus Otacilius Crassus
