= Lucius Valerius Flaccus =

Lucius Valerius Flaccus may refer to:

- Lucius Valerius Flaccus (consul 261 BC)
- Lucius Valerius Flaccus (consul 195 BC)
- Lucius Valerius Flaccus (consul 131 BC), Flamen Martialis
- Lucius Valerius Flaccus (consul 100 BC)
- Lucius Valerius Flaccus (consul 86 BC)
- Lucius Valerius Flaccus (praetor 63 BC), son of Lucius Valerius Flaccus (consul 86 BC)

== See also ==
- Valerius Flaccus (disambiguation)
