= 266 BC =

266 BC in various calendars
- Gregorian calendar: 266 BC; CCLXVI BC
- Ab urbe condita: 488
- Ancient Egypt era: XXXIII dynasty, 58
- Pharaoh: Ptolemy II Philadelphus, 18
- Ancient Greek Olympiad (summer): 128th Olympiad, year 3
- Assyrian calendar: 4485
- Balinese saka calendar: N/A
- Bengali calendar: −859 – −858
- Berber calendar: 685
- Buddhist calendar: 279
- Burmese calendar: −903
- Byzantine calendar: 5243–5244
- Chinese calendar: 甲午年 (Wood Horse); 2432 or 2225 — to — 乙未年 (Wood Goat); 2433 or 2226
- Coptic calendar: −549 – −548
- Discordian calendar: 901
- Ethiopian calendar: −273 – −272
- Hebrew calendar: 3495–3496
- Hindu calendars
- Vikram Samvat: −209 – −208
- Shaka Samvat: N/A
- Kali Yuga: 2835–2836
- Holocene calendar: 9735
- Iranian calendar: 887 BP – 886 BP
- Islamic calendar: 914 BH – 913 BH
- Javanese calendar: N/A
- Julian calendar: N/A
- Korean calendar: 2068
- Minguo calendar: 2177 before ROC 民前2177年
- Nanakshahi calendar: −1733
- Seleucid era: 46/47 AG
- Thai solar calendar: 277–278
- Tibetan calendar: ཤིང་ཕོ་རྟ་ལོ་ (male Wood-Horse) −139 or −520 or −1292 — to — ཤིང་མོ་ལུག་ལོ་ (female Wood-Sheep) −138 or −519 or −1291

Year 266 BC was a year of the pre-Julian Roman calendar. At the time it was known as the Year of the Consulship of Pera and Pictor (or, less frequently, year 488 Ab urbe condita). The denomination 266 BC for this year has been used since the early medieval period, when the Anno Domini calendar era became the prevalent method in Europe for naming years.

== Events ==
=== By place ===
==== Roman Republic ====
- January 23 – Marcus Atilius Regulus and Lucius Julius Libo celebrate triumphs over the Salentini.
- Calabria and Messapia are annexed by the Roman Republic.
- Caparronia, an ancient Roman Vestal virgin died by hanging after being convicted of unchastity.

==== Asia Minor ====
- Ariobarzanes becomes the second king of Pontus, succeeding his father Mithridates I Ctistes.

==== India ====
- The Mauryan emperor Ashoka converts to Buddhism.

== Births ==
- Berenice II, queen and co-regent of Egypt (or 267 BC)

== Deaths ==
- Huiwen of Zhao, Chinese king of Zhao (b. 310 BC)
- Mithridates I Ctistes, founder of the kingdom of Pontus
