= Lucius Postumius Megellus (consul 262 BC) =

Roman general and statesman, consul of 262 BCE

Lucius Postumius Megellus (c. 300 BC – 253 BC) was a politician and general during the middle years of the Roman Republic. He was elected consul in 262 BC, and fought during the early years of the First Punic War.

== Career ==
A member of the patrician Postumia clan, Megellus was the son of Lucius Postumius Megellus, who had been consul three times between 305 BC and 291 BC. The younger Megellus was elected Roman consul in his turn in 262 BC, during the third year of the First Punic War, alongside Quintus Mamilius Vitulus. After taking office at the beginning of May 262 BC, both consuls were dispatched within a few weeks of taking office to Sicily in response to a Carthaginian military build-up, which saw Carthage turn the town of Agrigentum into their principal base on the southern coast of Sicily. After possibly campaigning in western Sicily for a brief time they then spent the remainder of their consulate besieging and finally capturing the town of Agrigentum.

There is one anecdote of this lengthy campaign, ascribed by Frontinus to Megellus, where the consul noted a strategic weakness in the regular Carthaginian sorties, and was able to get around the attacking Carthaginian forces to attack them from the rear and completely rout the tired and hungry Carthaginians when they attempted to retreat to the town. Although the capture of the town was an important victory for Rome, neither consul was awarded a Triumph for their successful actions.

In 253 BC, Megellus had the unusual distinction of being elected both to the office of praetor and censor in the same year. (Note: Broughton identifies the Praetor of 253 BC with the consul of 262 BC. However, according to Francis X. Ryan, Rank and Participation in the Republican Senate (1998), pg. 163, there is some doubt about this, and he argues that the praetor in 253 was not the consul of 262.) During his time in occupying these offices, Megellus died.

== Sources ==
- Broughton, T. Robert S., The Magistrates of the Roman Republic, Vol I (1951)
- Lazenby, John Francis, The First Punic War: A Military History (1996)
- Smith, William, Dictionary of Greek and Roman Biography and Mythology, Vol II (1867).

== Footnotes ==
Political offices
Preceded by Manius Valerius Maximus Corvinus Messalla, and Manius Otacilius Crassus	Consul of the Roman Republic with Quintus Mamilius Vitulus; 262 BC	Succeeded by Lucius Valerius Flaccus, and Titus Otacilius Crassus
