= Caparronia =

Vestal virgin

Caparronia (d. 266 BCE) was an ancient Roman Vestal virgin who was convicted of unchastity and later died by hanging. According to the 4th-century Christian theologian Orosius, she was put to death alongside her seducer ("corruptor") and her slaves, who were supposedly accomplices ("consciique"). Alternatively, another 4th-century Christian theologian, this one being St. Jerome, describes an unnamed Vestal Virgin, perhaps Caparronia, who hanged herself following her conviction.

== Legacy ==
The Caparronia crater on the asteroid Vesta is named after the Roman Vestal virgin.
