= Lucius Valerius Flaccus (consul 261 BC) =

Roman politician and general

Lucius Valerius Flaccus was a Roman statesman and general during the middle era of the Roman Republic. He was one of the two consuls of 261 BCE, serving with Titus Otacilius Crassus. Together they fought in the ongoing First Punic War; they campaigned in Sicily. Before sailing to Sicily they strengthened the coastal defences of Italy against attacks by Hannibal Gisco, a Carthaginian admiral sent to raid the Tyrrhenian coast. The consuls besieged Mytistraton, but were eventually driven off by Hamilcar, the new commander of Carthage's Sicilian army, who inflicted a defeat on them at Thermae near Palermo. They returned to Italy were they started building a fleet. This fleet was the first Roman fleet of war ships ever and created after Carthaginian example. In 260, this fleet was ready.

He was possibly the ancestor of all later consuls by that name, since he marks the first appearance of a Lucius Valerius Flaccus on the list of consuls.

Political offices
Preceded by Lucius Postumius Megellus; Quintus Mamilius Vitulus	Consul of the Roman Republic; 261 BC; With: Titus Otacilius Crassus	Succeeded by Gnaeus Cornelius Scipio Asina; Gaius Duilius
