= Echetla =

Echetla (Ancient Greek: Ἐχέτλα) was a town in ancient Sicily located between Carthaginian and Syracusan territory during the First Punic War. In 263 BC The Roman consul Appius Claudius Caudex laid siege to Echetla but was forced to withdraw to Messana after suffering many losses.
