= 190 BC =

190 BC in various calendars
- Gregorian calendar: 190 BC; CXC BC
- Ab urbe condita: 564
- Ancient Egypt era: XXXIII dynasty, 134
- Pharaoh: Ptolemy V Epiphanes, 14
- Ancient Greek Olympiad (summer): 147th Olympiad, year 3
- Assyrian calendar: 4561
- Balinese saka calendar: N/A
- Bengali calendar: −783 – −782
- Berber calendar: 761
- Buddhist calendar: 355
- Burmese calendar: −827
- Byzantine calendar: 5319–5320
- Chinese calendar: 庚戌年 (Metal Dog); 2508 or 2301 — to — 辛亥年 (Metal Pig); 2509 or 2302
- Coptic calendar: −473 – −472
- Discordian calendar: 977
- Ethiopian calendar: −197 – −196
- Hebrew calendar: 3571–3572
- Hindu calendars
- Vikram Samvat: −133 – −132
- Shaka Samvat: N/A
- Kali Yuga: 2911–2912
- Holocene calendar: 9811
- Iranian calendar: 811 BP – 810 BP
- Islamic calendar: 836 BH – 835 BH
- Javanese calendar: N/A
- Julian calendar: N/A
- Korean calendar: 2144
- Minguo calendar: 2101 before ROC 民前2101年
- Nanakshahi calendar: −1657
- Seleucid era: 122/123 AG
- Thai solar calendar: 353–354
- Tibetan calendar: ལྕགས་ཕོ་ཁྱི་ལོ་ (male Iron-Dog) −63 or −444 or −1216 — to — ལྕགས་མོ་ཕག་ལོ་ (female Iron-Boar) −62 or −443 or −1215

Year 190 BC was a year of the pre-Julian Roman calendar. At the time it was known as the Year of the Consulship of Asiaticus and Laelius (or, less frequently, year 564 Ab urbe condita). The denomination 190 BC for this year has been used since the early medieval period, when the Anno Domini calendar era became the prevalent method in Europe for naming years.

== Events ==
=== By place ===
==== Greece ====
- The Battle of the Eurymedon is fought between a Seleucid fleet and ships from Rhodes and Pergamum, who are allied with the Roman Republic. The Seleucids are led by the famous Carthaginian general Hannibal. The Rhodians and their allies are victorious and Hannibal's fleet is forced to flee.
- Subsequently, the naval Battle of Myonessus is fought between a Seleucid fleet and a Roman fleet with the help of Rhodian ships. The Romans and their allies are victorious.
- As Philip V of Macedon has aided Rome against her enemies on the Greek peninsula, his tribute to Rome is remitted and his son, Demetrius, is restored to him after being held hostage in Rome for a number of years.

==== Seleucid Empire ====
- Meeting no further resistance from the Seleucids and their allies, the Roman army under general Scipio Africanus and his brother Lucius, along with King Eumenes II of Pergamum and other allies, cross the Hellespont into Anatolia.
- With the increasingly real threat to his Empire from the Romans, Antiochus III is eager to negotiate on the basis of Rome's previous demands, but the Romans insist that he first give up the region west of the Taurus Mountains. When Antiochus refuses, the Battle of Magnesia is fought near Magnesia ad Sipylum, on the plains of Lydia in Anatolia, between the Romans, led by the consul Lucius Cornelius Scipio and his brother, Scipio Africanus, with their ally Eumenes II of Pergamum, and the army of Antiochus III the Great of the Seleucid Empire. The resulting decisive Roman victory ends the conflict with the Seleucids for the control of Greece.
- Following Antiochus III's defeat by the Romans, two of Antiochus III's Armenian satraps, Artaxias and Zariadres, declare themselves independent of the Seleucids. With Roman consent, they establish themselves as kings of the Kingdom of Armenia and the district of Sophene (Armenia Minor), respectively. Artaxias builds his capital, Artaxata, on the Araxes River (now the Aras River) near Lake Sevan.
- For assisting the Romans in defeating Antiochus III, Eumenes II of Pergamum is rewarded with a great increase in territory. He is given control over the Thracian Chersonese (the modern Gallipoli peninsula) and over most of the former Seleucid possessions in Anatolia.

==== Roman Republic ====
- One of the main highways in Roman Italy, the Via Appia, is extended to Benevento and Venosa.

=== By topic ===
==== Art ====
- The statue Nike (Victory) of Samothrace is created (possible date). It is discovered in 1863 and is now kept at Musée du Louvre in Paris.

== Births ==
- Cornelia, second daughter of Scipio Africanus. She will be considered by Roman society to be the perfect example of a virtuous Roman woman (d. 100 BC)
- Hipparchus, Greek astronomer, geographer, and mathematician (d. c. 120 BC)
- Judah Maccabeus (who then became a leader of the Maccabees) (d. c. 160 BC)

== Deaths ==
- Apollonius of Perga, Greek mathematician, geometer and astronomer of the Alexandrian school, known by his contemporaries as "The Great Geometer", whose treatise "Conics" is one of the greatest scientific works from the ancient world (b. c. 262 BC)
