= 267 BC =

267 BC in various calendars
- Gregorian calendar: 267 BC; CCLXVII BC
- Ab urbe condita: 487
- Ancient Egypt era: XXXIII dynasty, 57
- Pharaoh: Ptolemy II Philadelphus, 17
- Ancient Greek Olympiad (summer): 128th Olympiad, year 2
- Assyrian calendar: 4484
- Balinese saka calendar: N/A
- Bengali calendar: −860 – −859
- Berber calendar: 684
- Buddhist calendar: 278
- Burmese calendar: −904
- Byzantine calendar: 5242–5243
- Chinese calendar: 癸巳年 (Water Snake); 2431 or 2224 — to — 甲午年 (Wood Horse); 2432 or 2225
- Coptic calendar: −550 – −549
- Discordian calendar: 900
- Ethiopian calendar: −274 – −273
- Hebrew calendar: 3494–3495
- Hindu calendars
- Vikram Samvat: −210 – −209
- Shaka Samvat: N/A
- Kali Yuga: 2834–2835
- Holocene calendar: 9734
- Iranian calendar: 888 BP – 887 BP
- Islamic calendar: 915 BH – 914 BH
- Javanese calendar: N/A
- Julian calendar: N/A
- Korean calendar: 2067
- Minguo calendar: 2178 before ROC 民前2178年
- Nanakshahi calendar: −1734
- Seleucid era: 45/46 AG
- Thai solar calendar: 276–277
- Tibetan calendar: ཆུ་མོ་སྦྲུལ་ལོ་ (female Water-Snake) −140 or −521 or −1293 — to — ཤིང་ཕོ་རྟ་ལོ་ (male Wood-Horse) −139 or −520 or −1292

Year 267 BC was a year of the pre-Julian Roman calendar. At the time it was known as the Year of the Consulship of Regulus and Libo (or, less frequently, year 487 Ab urbe condita). The denomination 267 BC for this year has been used since the early medieval period, when the Anno Domini calendar era became the prevalent method in Europe for naming years.

== Events ==
=== By place ===
==== Greece ====
- Macedonia's King Antigonus II Gonatas has to deal with a rebellion by an Athenian-led coalition of Spartans (led by King Areus I of Sparta), Athenians (led by Chremonides), Arcadians and Achaeans that tries to expel the Macedonian forces located in southern Greece. The rebellion has the support of Ptolemy II of Egypt.

== Births ==
- Berenice II, queen and co-regent of Egypt (or 266 BC)

== Deaths ==
- Devanampiya Tissa, ruler of Anuradhapura (Sri Lanka)
