= Hierocles =

Hierocles may refer to:

- Hierocles (Stoic), 2nd century, Stoic philosopher
- Hierocles (charioteer), 2nd–3rd century, presumed lover and court official of the emperor Elagabalus
- Sossianus Hierocles, 3rd–4th century, proconsul of Bithynia and Alexandria during the reign of Diocletian
- Hierocles, possibly 4th century, co-editor of Philogelos
- Hierocles of Alexandria, 5th century, Greek Neoplatonist writer
- Hierocles (author of Synecdemus), 6th century, Byzantine geographer, author of the Synecdemus
- Hierocles, a character in the play Peace by Aristophanes
- Hierocles of Hyllarima, ancient Greek athlete and philosopher
