= Manius Valerius Maximus Messalla =

Roman politician and general, consul in 263 BCE, censor in 252 BCE

Manius Valerius Maximus Messalla was consul in 263 BC with Manius Otacilius Crassus as his consular collegae. Messalla served as censor in 252 BC.

== Biography ==
Manius Valerius Maximus was the son of Marcus Valerius Maximus Corvinus, consul in 289 BC, and grandson of Marcus Valerius Corvus. With his colleague, Manius Otacilius Crassus, he gained a brilliant victory over the Carthaginians and Syracusans: more than sixty of the Sicilian towns acknowledged the supremacy of Rome, and the consuls concluded a peace treaty with Hieron of Syracuse, which lasted the remainder of his [Hieron] long life. This acknowledgment proved equally advantageous to both Syracuse and Rome. He was awarded the triumph De Paeneis et Rege Siculorum Hierone.

His relief of Messana obtained him the cognomen Messalla, which remained in the family for nearly 800 years. To commemorate his Sicilian victory, he arranged for it to be pictorially represented (painted) on the wall of the Curia Hostilia, the first example of an historical fresco at Rome(it still hung there two centuries later). He is also said to have brought the first sundial from Catana to Rome, where it was set up on a column in the forum.

Messalla was censor in 252 BC, when he degraded 400 equites to aerarians for neglect of duty in.

Political offices
Preceded by Appius Claudius Caudex; Marcus Fulvius Flaccus	Roman consul with Manius Otacilius Crassus; 263 BC	Succeeded by Lucius Postumius Megellus; Quintus Mamilius Vitulus
