= 264 BC =

264 BC in various calendars
- Gregorian calendar: 264 BC; CCLXIV BC
- Ab urbe condita: 490
- Ancient Egypt era: XXXIII dynasty, 60
- Pharaoh: Ptolemy II Philadelphus, 20
- Ancient Greek Olympiad (summer): 129th Olympiad (victor)¹
- Assyrian calendar: 4487
- Balinese saka calendar: N/A
- Bengali calendar: −857 – −856
- Berber calendar: 687
- Buddhist calendar: 281
- Burmese calendar: −901
- Byzantine calendar: 5245–5246
- Chinese calendar: 丙申年 (Fire Monkey); 2434 or 2227 — to — 丁酉年 (Fire Rooster); 2435 or 2228
- Coptic calendar: −547 – −546
- Discordian calendar: 903
- Ethiopian calendar: −271 – −270
- Hebrew calendar: 3497–3498
- Hindu calendars
- Vikram Samvat: −207 – −206
- Shaka Samvat: N/A
- Kali Yuga: 2837–2838
- Holocene calendar: 9737
- Iranian calendar: 885 BP – 884 BP
- Islamic calendar: 912 BH – 911 BH
- Javanese calendar: N/A
- Julian calendar: N/A
- Korean calendar: 2070
- Minguo calendar: 2175 before ROC 民前2175年
- Nanakshahi calendar: −1731
- Seleucid era: 48/49 AG
- Thai solar calendar: 279–280
- Tibetan calendar: མེ་ཕོ་སྤྲེ་ལོ་ (male Fire-Monkey) −137 or −518 or −1290 — to — མེ་མོ་བྱ་ལོ་ (female Fire-Bird) −136 or −517 or −1289

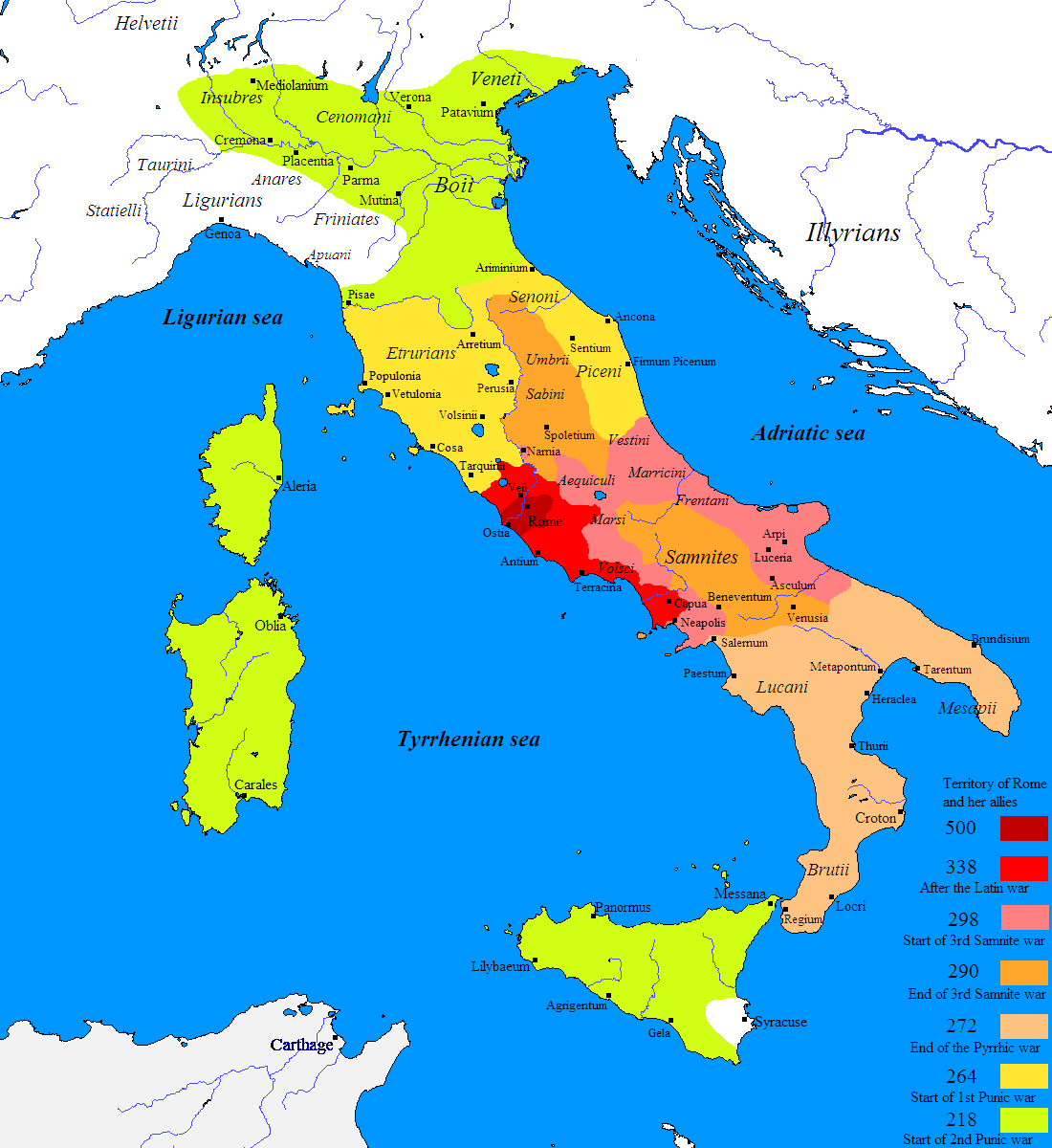
Roman expansion in Italy from 500 BC to 218 BC through the Latin War (light red), Samnite Wars (pink/orange), Pyrrhic War (beige), and First and Second Punic War (yellow and green). The Roman Republic in 264 BC is marked with all colours except light green and white.

Year 264 BC was a year of the pre-Julian Roman calendar. At the time it was known as the Year of the Consulship of Caudex and Flaccus (or, less frequently, year 490 Ab urbe condita). The denomination 264 BC for this year has been used since the early medieval period, when the Anno Domini calendar era became the prevalent method in Europe for naming years.

== Events ==
=== By place ===
==== Greece ====
- Abantidas, the son of Paseas, becomes tyrant of the Greek city-state of Sicyon after murdering Cleinias. He either banishes or puts to death Cleinias' friends and relations. Cleinias' young son, Aratus, narrowly escapes death.

==== Roman Republic ====
- Start of war between the Romans and the Carthaginians-First Punic War
- The tyrant of Syracuse, Hiero II, once more attacks the Mamertines. They ally themselves with a nearby Carthaginian fleet and hold off the Syracusans. However, when the Carthaginians do not leave, the Mamertines appeal to Rome for an alliance, hoping for more reliable protection. Although initially reluctant to assist, lest it encourage other mercenary groups to mutiny, Rome is unwilling to see Carthaginian power spread further over Sicily and encroach on Italy. Rome therefore enters into an alliance with the Mamertines. By this action, the First Punic War begins and will embroil Rome in a conflict with Carthage that will continue for 23 years.
- The Roman consul Appius Claudius Caudex and his two legions are deployed to Sicily, the first time a Roman army has gone into action outside the Italian peninsula.
- Appius Claudius Caudex leads his forces to Messina, and as the Mamertines have convinced the Carthaginians to withdraw, he meets with only minimal resistance. The Mamertines hand the city over to Appius Claudius, but the Carthaginians return to set up a blockade. The Syracusans, meanwhile, are also stationed outside the city.
- Appius Claudius leads his troops outside the city of Messina to defeat the Syracusans in battle forcing Hiero to retreat to Syracuse. The next day Claudius defeats the Carthaginians.
- The temple to Vertumnus is built on the Aventine Hill in Rome.
- Three pairs of gladiators face off in the first recorded gladiatorial combat, held at the funeral games in honour of aristocrat Junius Brutus Pera in the Forum Boarium.

==== China ====
- General Bai Qi of the State of Qin attacks the State of Han and captures the city of Jing, defeating its large garrison. He then captures various other towns and cities.
- The Confucian philosopher Xunzi visits the State of Qin. He writes of his and others' admiration for the government officials of Qin, who he says are serious and sincere, free from the tendency to form cliques. The Qin officials are disciplined by a meritocracy of rather harsh methods imposed by the Legalist philosophy.
