= 197 BC =

197 BC in various calendars
- Gregorian calendar: 197 BC; CXCVII BC
- Ab urbe condita: 557
- Ancient Egypt era: XXXIII dynasty, 127
- Pharaoh: Ptolemy V Epiphanes, 7
- Ancient Greek Olympiad (summer): 145th Olympiad, year 4
- Assyrian calendar: 4554
- Balinese saka calendar: N/A
- Bengali calendar: −790 – −789
- Berber calendar: 754
- Buddhist calendar: 348
- Burmese calendar: −834
- Byzantine calendar: 5312–5313
- Chinese calendar: 癸卯年 (Water Rabbit); 2501 or 2294 — to — 甲辰年 (Wood Dragon); 2502 or 2295
- Coptic calendar: −480 – −479
- Discordian calendar: 970
- Ethiopian calendar: −204 – −203
- Hebrew calendar: 3564–3565
- Hindu calendars
- Vikram Samvat: −140 – −139
- Shaka Samvat: N/A
- Kali Yuga: 2904–2905
- Holocene calendar: 9804
- Iranian calendar: 818 BP – 817 BP
- Islamic calendar: 843 BH – 842 BH
- Javanese calendar: N/A
- Julian calendar: N/A
- Korean calendar: 2137
- Minguo calendar: 2108 before ROC 民前2108年
- Nanakshahi calendar: −1664
- Seleucid era: 115/116 AG
- Thai solar calendar: 346–347
- Tibetan calendar: ཆུ་མོ་ཡོས་ལོ་ (female Water-Hare) −70 or −451 or −1223 — to — ཤིང་ཕོ་འབྲུག་ལོ་ (male Wood-Dragon) −69 or −450 or −1222

Year 197 BC was a year of the pre-Julian Roman calendar. At the time it was known as the Year of the Consulship of Cethegus and Rufus (or, less frequently, year 557 Ab urbe condita). The denomination 197 BC for this year has been used since the early medieval period, when the Anno Domini calendar era became the prevalent method in Europe for naming years.

== Events ==
=== By place ===
==== Asia Minor ====
- Eumenes II becomes King of Pergamum following the death of his father Attalus I Soter.
- Antiochus III occupies parts of the kingdom of Pergamum and a number of Greek cities in Anatolia.

==== Egypt ====
- The Egyptian King, Ptolemy V, fights rebels in the Nile Delta, exhibiting great cruelty toward those of their leaders who capitulate.

==== Greece ====
- The Spartan ruler, Nabis, acquires the important city of Argos from Philip V of Macedon, as the price of his alliance with the Macedonians. Nabis then defects to the Romans in the expectation of being able to hold on to his conquest.
- The Battle of Cynoscephalae in Thessaly gives a Roman army under proconsul Titus Quinctius Flamininus a decisive victory over Philip V of Macedon. In the Treaty of Tempe, the terms of the peace proposed by the Roman general and adopted by the Roman Senate specify that Philip V can retain his throne and control of Macedonia, but he has to abandon all the Greek cities he has conquered. Philip also has to provide to the Romans 1,000 talents as indemnity, surrender most of his fleet and provide hostages, including his younger son, Demetrius, who is to be held in Rome. The Aetolians propose that Philip V be ejected from his throne but Flamininus opposes this.
- The volcanic island of Hiera emerges from under the sea near Thera.

==== Hispania ====
- Hispania is divided into Hispania Ulterior and Hispania Citerior.
- The Iberian revolt breaks out in Citerior and Ulterior against Roman domination.

==== China ====
- Chen Xi begins a rebellion against the Han dynasty in the Dai region of the northern frontier.

== Deaths ==
- Attalus I Soter, ruler of Pergamum from 241 BC, who has taken on the title of king after about 230 BC. Through his military and diplomatic skills, he has created a powerful kingdom in Anatolia (b. 269 BC)
- Liu Taigong, Chinese emperor of the Han dynasty
