= Marcus Fulvius Flaccus (consul 264 BC) =

Roman consul and general

Marcus Fulvius Flaccus was a consul in 264 BC. In the tradition of Livy, his praenomen is "Quintus".

In his consulship, Fulvius Flaccus concluded the siege of Volsinii (Etruscan: Velzna), which his predecessor Quintus Fabius Maximus Gurges had started, and been killed while conducting; after plundering the city, he ordered it razed and the survivors relocated. The Fasti Triumphales record he celebrated a triumph on 1 November 264 BC. In the 1960s, his donarium was recovered from Sant'Omobono in Rome, and the number of scars on the top of the monument confirm the quantity of statues he brought from Volsinii to Rome. It was the last Etruscan city to be taken by the Romans.

Political offices
Preceded by Quintus Fabius Maximus Gurges; Lucius Mamilius Vitulus	Roman consul 264 BC with Appius Claudius Caudex	Succeeded by Manius Valerius Maximus Messalla; Manius Otacilius Crassus
