= 282 BC =

282 BC in various calendars
Gregorian calendar	282 BC; CCLXXXII BC
Ab urbe condita	472
Ancient Egypt era	XXXIII dynasty, 42
Pharaoh	Ptolemy II Philadelphus, 2
Ancient Greek Olympiad (summer)	124th Olympiad, year 3
Assyrian calendar	4469
Balinese saka calendar	N/A
Bengali calendar	−875 – −874
Berber calendar	669
Buddhist calendar	263
Burmese calendar	−919
Byzantine calendar	5227–5228
Chinese calendar	戊寅年 (Earth Tiger); 2416 or 2209 — to — 己卯年 (Earth Rabbit); 2417 or 2210
Coptic calendar	−565 – −564
Discordian calendar	885
Ethiopian calendar	−289 – −288
Hebrew calendar	3479–3480
- Hindu calendars
Vikram Samvat	−225 – −224
Shaka Samvat	N/A
Kali Yuga	2819–2820
Holocene calendar	9719
Iranian calendar	903 BP – 902 BP
Islamic calendar	931 BH – 930 BH
Javanese calendar	N/A
Julian calendar	N/A
Korean calendar	2052
Minguo calendar	2193 before ROC 民前2193年
Nanakshahi calendar	−1749
Seleucid era	30/31 AG
Thai solar calendar	261–262
Tibetan calendar	ས་ཕོ་སྟག་ལོ་ (male Earth-Tiger) −155 or −536 or −1308 — to — ས་མོ་ཡོས་ལོ་ (female Earth-Hare) −154 or −535 or −1307

Year 282 BC was a year of the pre-Julian Roman calendar. At the time it was known as the Year of the Consulship of Luscinus and Papus (or, less frequently, year 472 Ab urbe condita). The denomination 282 BC for this year has been used since the early medieval period, when the Anno Domini calendar era became the prevalent method in Europe for naming years.

== Events ==
=== By place ===
==== Asia Minor ====
- The city of Pergamum in Asia Minor ends its allegiance to Lysimachus. Its ruler, Philetaerus, transfers his allegiance, as well as the important fortress of Pergamon and his treasury, to Seleucus, who allows him a far larger measure of independence than he had hitherto enjoyed.

==== Roman Republic ====
- The Battle of Populonia is fought between Rome and the Etruscans. The Romans are victorious and, as a result, the Etruscan threat to Rome is sharply diminished.
- The Magna Graecia city of Thurii appeals to Rome for help against the native Italian tribes. Though the Roman Senate hesitates, the plebeian Assembly decides to respond. Thurii is saved, but Tarentum, jealous of Rome's interference, attacks and sinks some Roman ships entering its harbour. Roman envoys, sent to protest, are mistreated.
- Rome declares war on Tarentum. King Pyrrhus of Epirus declares his willingness to come to the aid of Tarentum. Tarentum also looks for support from the Samnites and other Italian tribes in southern Italy.

==== Egypt ====
- Arsinoe, daughter of Lysimachus, king of Thrace, marries Ptolemy II of Egypt as part of the alliance between Thrace and Egypt against Seleucus.

== Deaths ==
- Ptolemy I Soter, Macedonian military general who served under Alexander the Great and became ruler of Egypt (born c.367)
