= Longanus =

River in Italy

The Longanus (also Longanos or Loitanus) was a river in north-eastern Sicily on the Mylaean plain. As recorded by Polybius, it was where the Mamertines were drastically defeated by Hiero II of Syracuse in around 269 BC. The small settlement of Longane was near it. The river was considered so important that it was represented as a God in coins. Some archeologists identify it with the river that rises in the valley of Fondachelli-Fantina town called Patrì or Fantina.

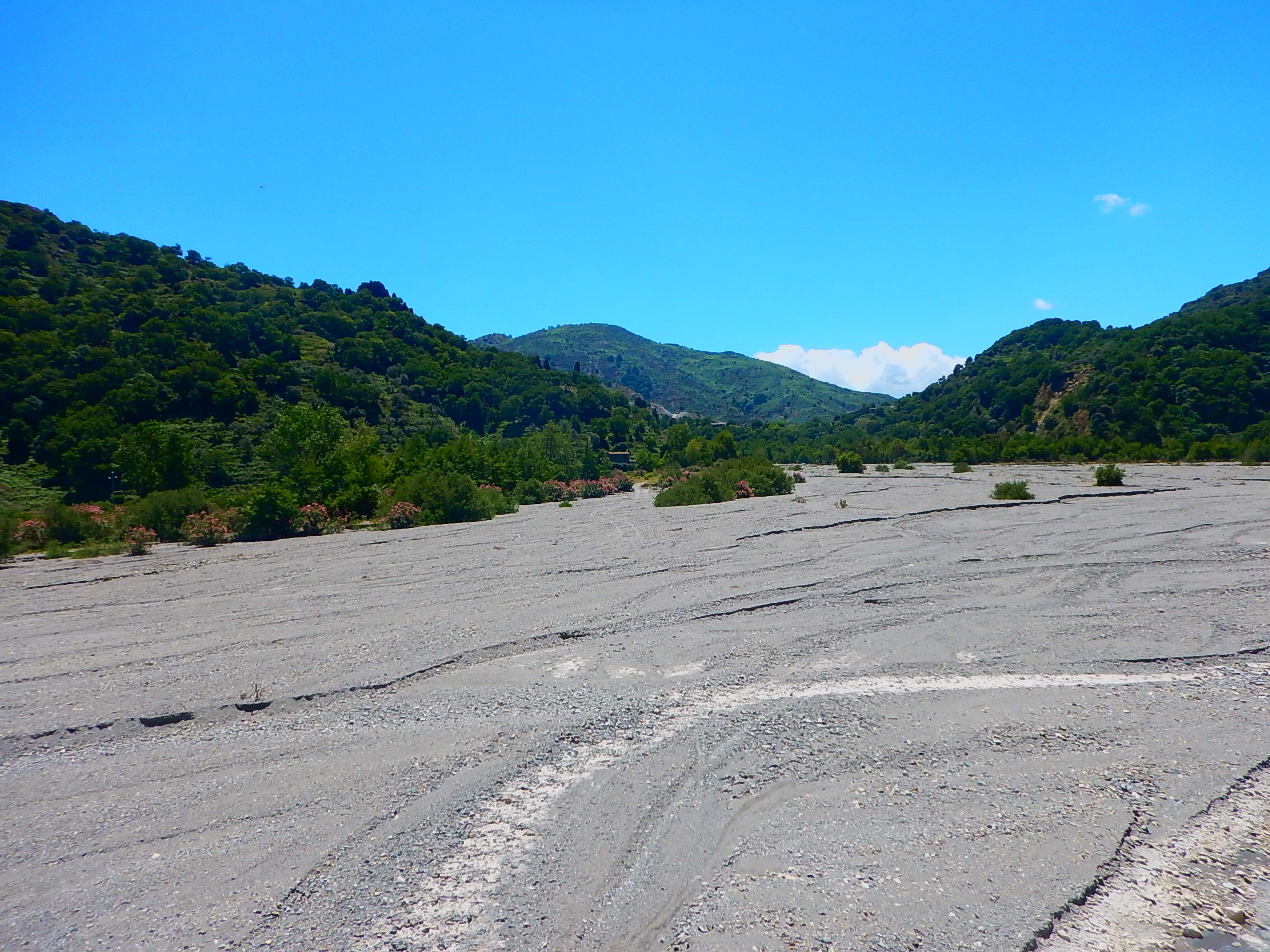
The huge bed of the Patrì river is a reason it is considered the true Longanus River

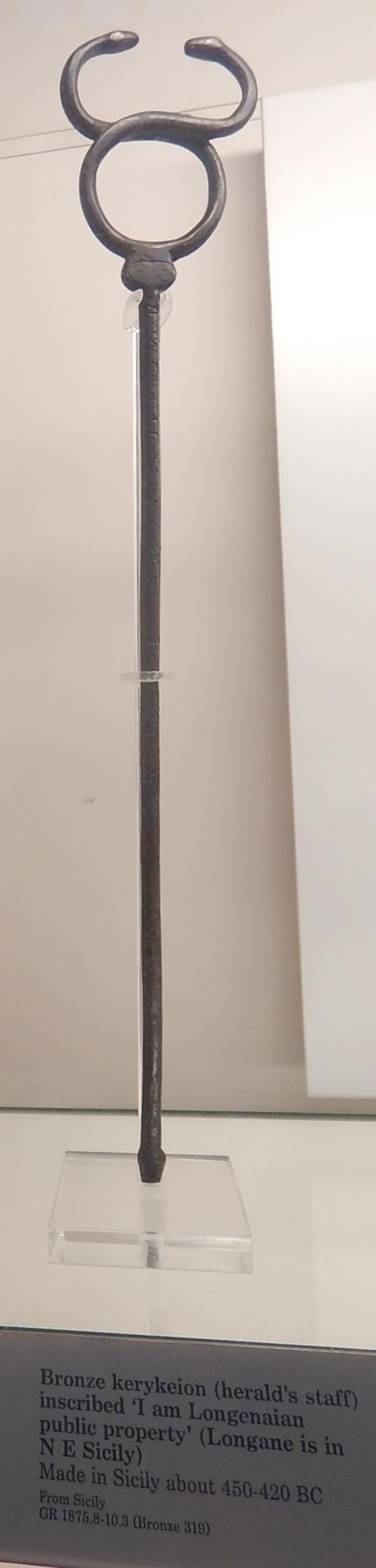
This bronze kerykeion at the British Museum is the only object known that Longanus has given back apart the coin
