= Appius Claudius Caudex =

Roman senator (fl. 264 BC)

- Born: Unknown
- Office: Roman Consul (264)

Appius Claudius Caudex (fl. 264 BC) was a Roman politician. He was the younger brother of Appius Claudius Caecus, and served as consul in 264 BC.

In that year, he drew Rome into conflict with Carthage over possession of Sicily. In 265 BC, Hiero II of Syracuse had attacked Messana (modern Messina) in an attempt to capture it from the Mamertines, mercenaries from Campania who had taken it some years before. The Mamertines allied with a nearby Carthaginian fleet and held off the Syracusans, but when the Carthaginians did not leave, the Mamertines appealed to Rome in 264 BC.

Some senators were opposed to helping them, but Appius Claudius persuaded the citizens to support them. He led a force to Messina and, as the Mamertines had convinced the Carthaginians to withdraw, he met with only a symbolic resistance. The Mamertines handed the city over to Appius Claudius, but the Carthaginians returned and laid siege to Messana. The Syracusans, meanwhile, were also stationed outside the city. Claudius tried to send ambassadors to both the Carthaginians and the Syracusans, but he was ignored. He then led his troops outside the city, defeated the Syracusans in battle, and Hiero retreated back to Syracuse. The next day Claudius also defeated the Carthaginians. Following these victories Appius laid siege to Echetla but after the loss of many troops returned to Messana.

This dispute was one of the immediate causes of the First Punic War.

According to the Roman philosopher Seneca the Younger he was surnamed Caudex because of his boats: "among the ancients a structure formed by joining together several boards was called a caudex".

== Citations ==
Political offices
Preceded by Quintus Fabius Maximus Gurges; Lucius Mamilius Vitulus	Roman consul 264 BC with Marcus Fulvius Flaccus	Succeeded by Manius Valerius Maximus Messalla; Manius Otacilius Crassus
