= Mamertines =

Ancient mercenaries of south Italy

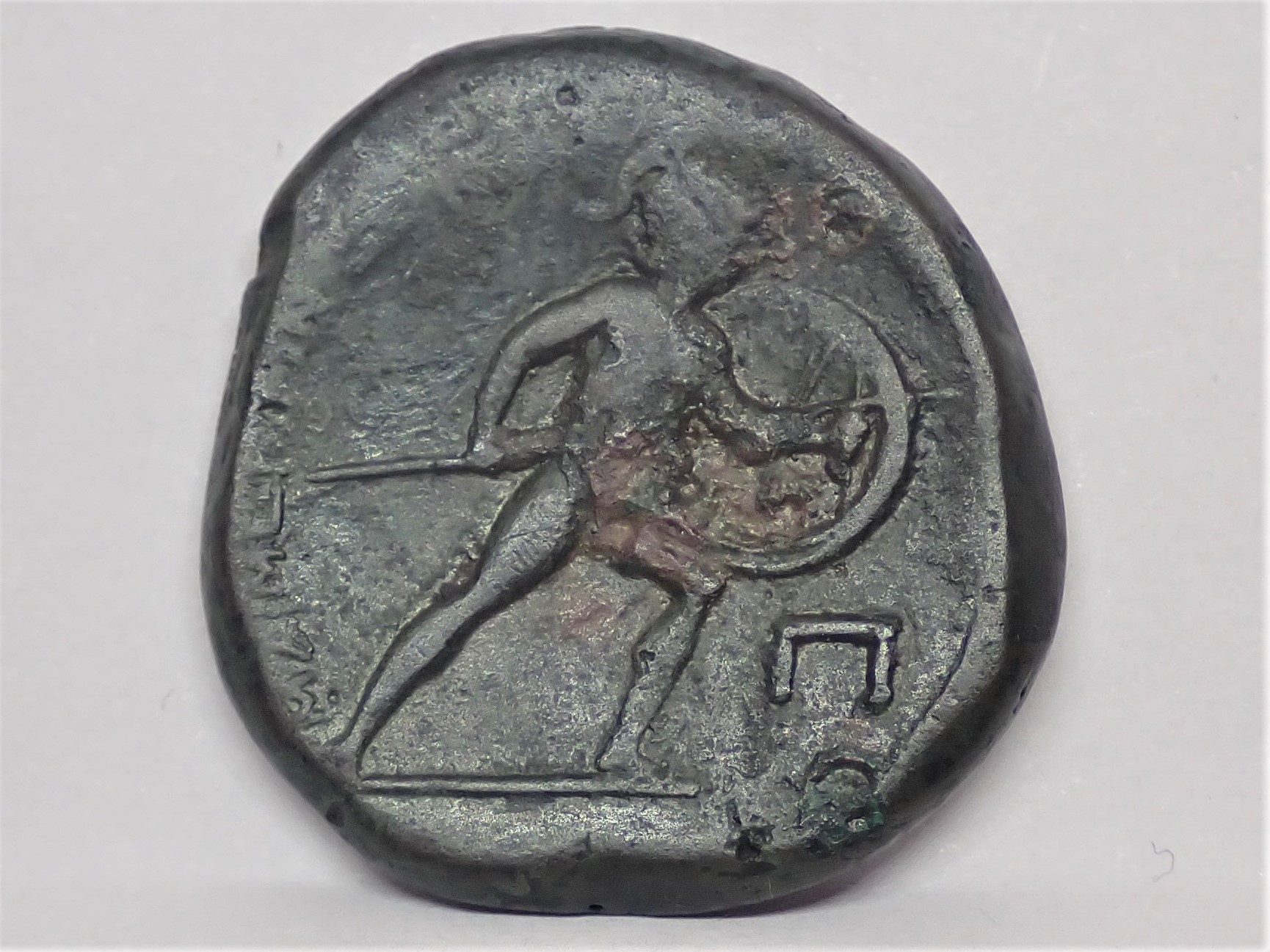
Coin minted under Mamertine rule, depicting a warrior

The Mamertines (Latin: Mamertini, "sons of Mars", Greek: Μαμερτίνοι) were Greek mercenaries of Italic origin who had been hired from their home in Campania by Agathocles (361–289 BC), Tyrant of Syracuse and self-proclaimed King of Sicily. After Syracuse lost the Seventh Sicilian War, the Greek city of Messina was ceded to Carthage in 307 BC. When Agathocles died in 289 BC it left many of his mercenaries idle and unemployed in Sicily. Most of them returned home but some, liking the climate and the prospect of adventure on a foreign island, remained. They played a major role in the lead-up to the First Punic War.

In 280 BC, the Syracusans appealed to King Pyrrhus of Epirus for help against the Mamertines.

== Capture of Messina ==
The then-small band of desperados came across the walled Greek settlement of Messina built on a strategic location on the north-eastern tip of Sicily on the strait between Sicily and Italy. Together with the fort Rhegium on the toe of Italy, it was the crossing point between Italy and Sicily. Being a peaceful people, the inhabitants allowed the travelling mercenaries into their homes. After a time, the mercenaries became restless and plotted to capture the town. One night, the mercenaries betrayed their hosts and killed most of the population, who were unprepared. In this way, they claimed Messina for themselves in 288 BC. The surviving Messinians were thrown out and the property and women divided. After their victory, the mercenaries named themselves the Mamertines after the Oscan war-god Mamers.

== Dominion over northeastern Sicily ==
The Mamertines held the town of Messina for over 20 years. They changed it from a bustling town of farmers and traders to a raiding base. The Mamertines became pirates on land and sea. Taking advantage of the war-weary Sicilians, they looted the nearby settlements and captured trade ships on the strait, carrying their plunder back to their base. They captured prisoners and demanded tribute. During this period, they struck coins featuring their name and images of their gods and goddesses. Their exploits made them rich and powerful. They began travelling further inland, even as far as Gela, and demanding tribute.

== Decline ==
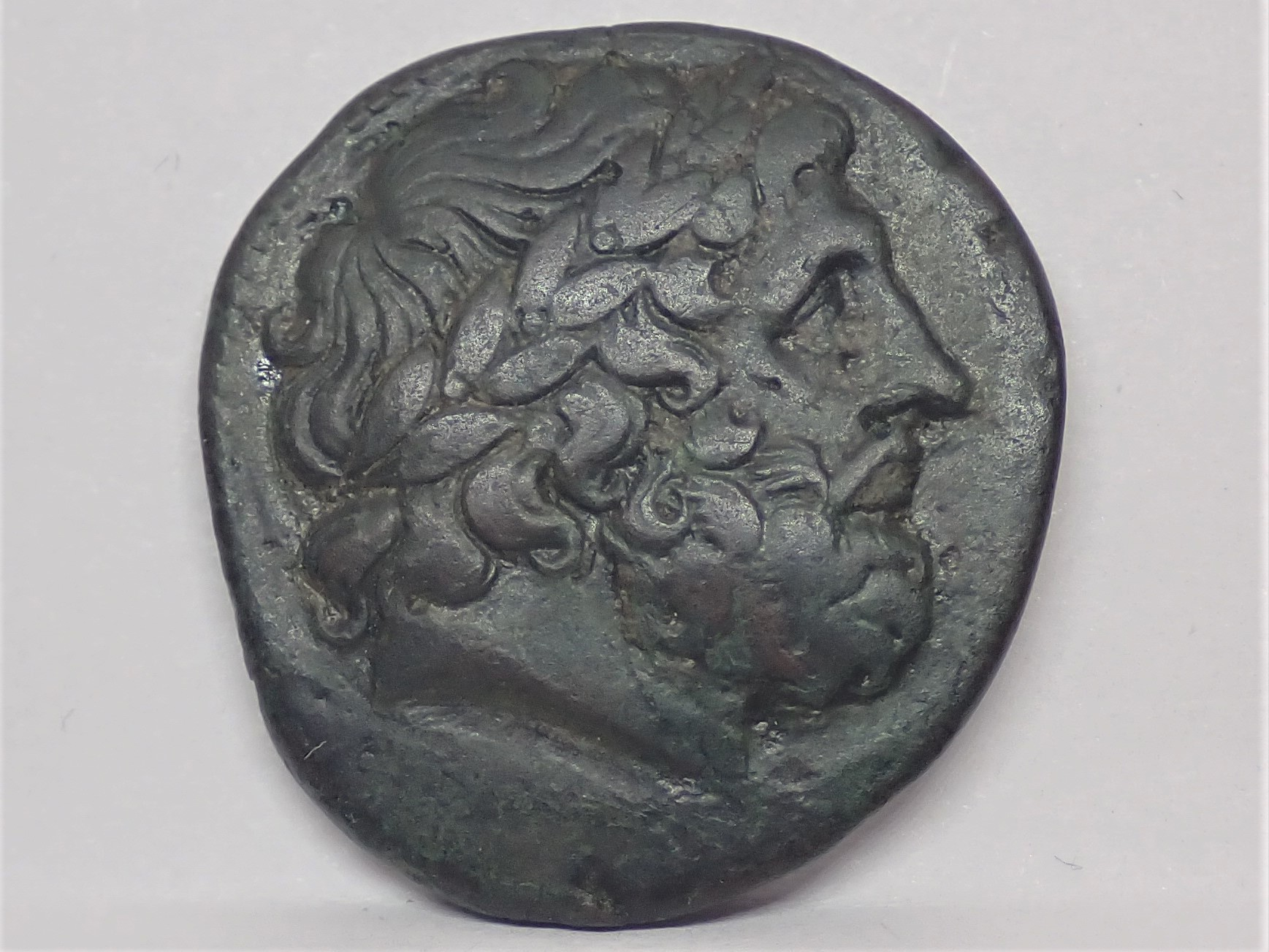
Coin minted under Mamertine rule, depicting Zeus

The Mamertine presence did not go unchallenged forever. In around 270 BC, the Mamertine exploits came to the attention of Syracuse, by word of the refugees from the settlements. Hiero II, tyrant of Syracuse, began to gather an army of citizens with which to rid the land of the destroyers of the peace and rescue his Greek kinsmen. Hiero met with the Mamertines when they were nearing Syracuse. Marching out his troops, he first sent his unruly mercenaries forward and allowed them to be butchered by the Mamertines. The faithless part of his army disposed of, Hiero marched his citizen soldiers back to the city where he drilled them until they were in better fighting condition. Leading his confident army north, he found the Mamertines again at the Longanus River on the plain of Mylae, where he easily defeated them and proclaimed himself king. The Mamertines were not accustomed to large pitched battles and had become reckless after beating Hiero's mercenaries. In the battle, Hiero captured the Mamertine leaders and the remnants fled back to the safety of Messina. Hiero had restricted Mamertine activity and placed them in a dire situation.

When Hiero returned to besiege their base at Messina in 265 BC, the Mamertines called for help from a nearby fleet from Carthage, which occupied the harbour of Messina. Seeing this, the Syracusan forces retired, not wishing to confront Carthaginian forces. Uncomfortable under the Carthaginian "protection," the Mamertines now appealed to Rome to be allowed into the protection of the Roman people. At first, the Romans did not wish to come to the aid of soldiers who had unjustly stolen a city from its rightful possessors. However, unwilling to see Carthaginian power spread further over Sicily and get too close to Italy, Rome responded by entering into an alliance with the Mamertines. In response, Syracuse allied itself with Carthage, imploring their protection. With Rome and Carthage brought into conflict, the Syracusan/Mamertine conflict escalated into the First Punic War.

== Legacy ==
Once the scale of the conflict had escalated beyond them, the Mamertines were lost to the historical record and their fate is lost, swallowed up in the larger events of the Punic wars. After the First Punic War, however, their name was not quite forgotten in the ancient world since "Mamertine wine" from the vineyards of north-eastern tip of Sicily was still known and enjoyed in the 1st century. It was the favourite of Gaius Julius Caesar and it was he who made it popular after serving it at a feast to celebrate his third consulship.

Even centuries after the Mamertine occupation, the inhabitants of Messina were still called Mamertines.

In his novel Salammbô, Gustave Flaubert writes of the Greeks singing the 'old song of the Mamertines': "With my lance and sword I plough and reap; I am master of the house! The disarmed man falls at my feet and calls me Lord and Great King."

== See also ==
- Punic Wars
- Sicilian Wars
