= Hiero II of Syracuse =

King of Syracuse (r. c. 271 – 216)

Hiero II
- Tyrant
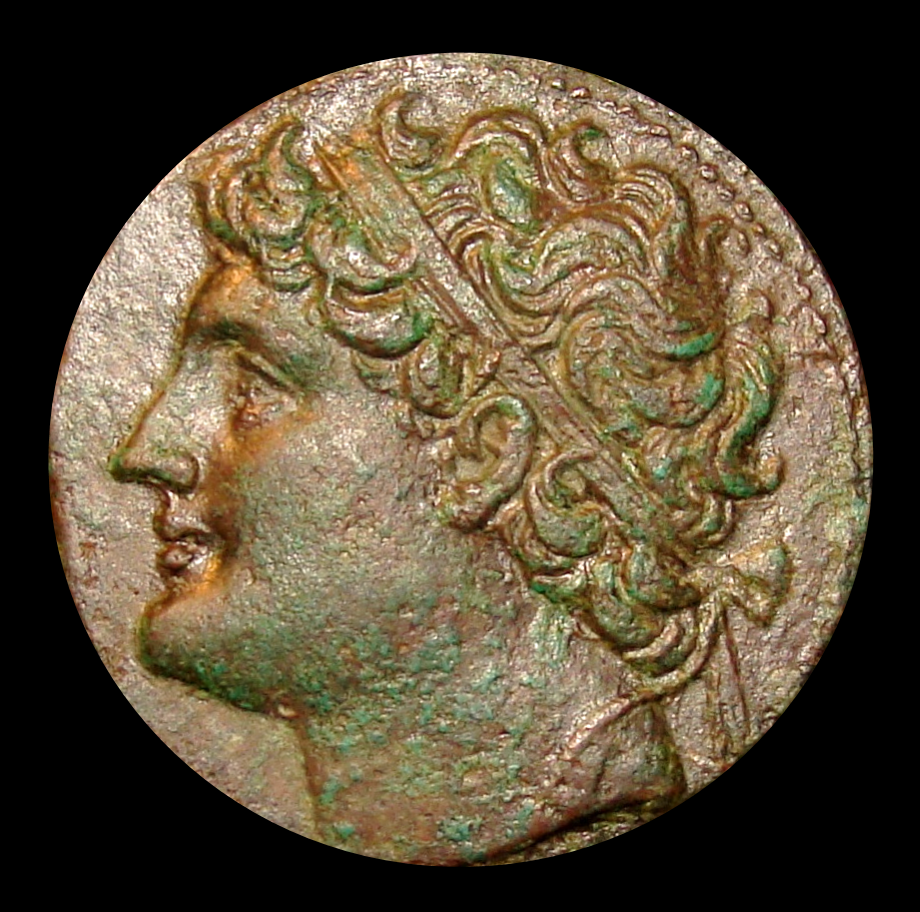
- A coin showing Hiero II

Tyrant of Syracuse
- Reign: 275–215 BC
- Predecessor: Pyrrhus of Epirus
- Successor: Hieronymus
- Co-monarch: Gelo II (241-216 BC)
- Born: c. 308 BC
- Died: 215 BC
- Spouse: Philistis
- Issue: Gelo II; Damarata; Heraclea
- Dynasty: Hieronids
- Father: Hierocles

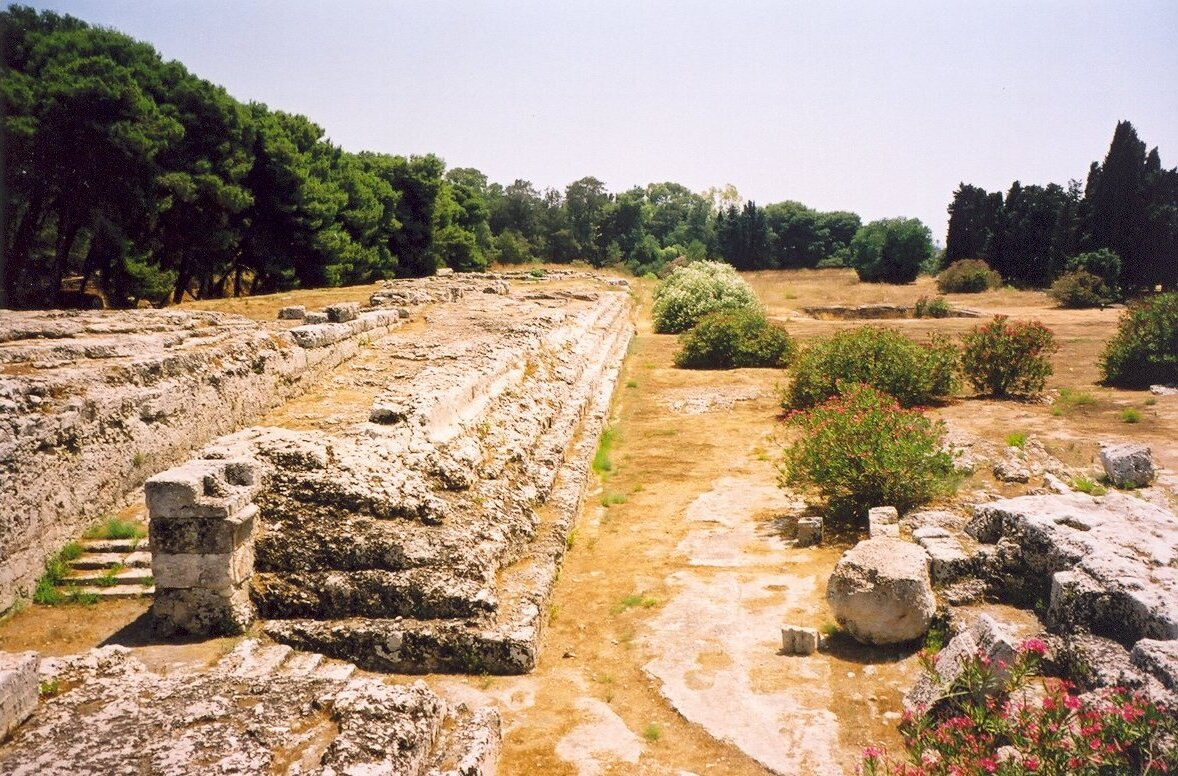
Great altar of Syracuse, built by Hiero II

Hiero II (/ˈhaɪəroʊ/; also Hieron /ˈhaɪərɒn/; Ancient Greek: Ἱέρων; c. 308 BC – 215 BC) was the Greek tyrant of Syracuse, Greek Sicily, from 275 to 215 BC, and the illegitimate son of a Syracusan noble, Hierocles, who claimed descent from Gelon. He was a former general of Pyrrhus of Epirus and an important figure of the First Punic War. He figures in the story of famed thinker Archimedes shouting "Eureka".

== Rise to power ==
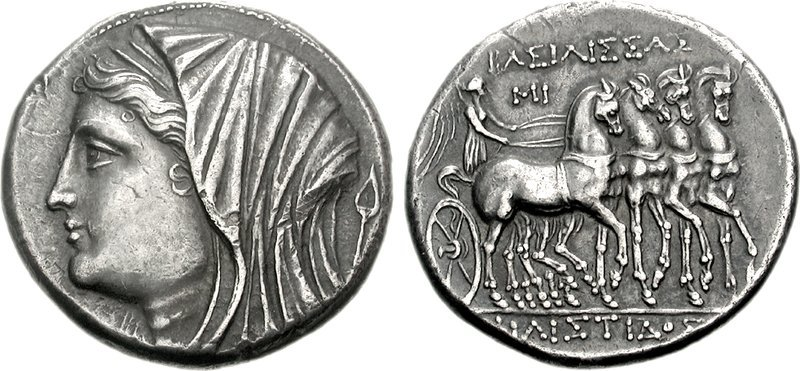
Image of Philistis (left), the wife of Hiero II, from a coin.

When Pyrrhus left Sicily (275 BC) the Syracusan army and citizens appointed Hiero commander-in-chief. He strengthened his position by marrying the daughter of Leptines, one of the leading citizen of Syracuse. Hiero was later able to prove his military worth against the Mamertines, a body of mercenaries from Campania who had been employed by Agathocles, the late tyrant of Syracuse, and seized the stronghold of Messina, which they used as a base of operations to harass the Greeks around them. They were finally defeated in a pitched battle near Mylae along the Longanus river by Hiero, who was only prevented from capturing Messina by Carthaginian interference. Between 275 and 271 he seized total power in the city by allying himself with the demos, but unlike the past kings or tyrants of Syracuse, he ruled within the law, and acknowledged the will of the assemblies of Syracuse.

== First Punic War ==
Fighting the Mamertines prior to the formal start of the First Punic war, he was proclaimed king after a victory in 265 BC. The next year, the Mamertines became desperate and called for Roman aid. Hiero at once joined the Punic leader Hanno, who had recently landed in Sicily; but fighting a battle to an inconclusive outcome with the Romans led by the consul Appius Claudius Caudex, he withdrew to Syracuse.

Pressed by the Roman forces, in 263 he concluded a treaty with Rome, by which he was to rule over the south-east of Sicily and the eastern coast as far as Tauromenium.

== After the Punic War ==
He died shortly after the Battle of Cannae in 216 BC. Until his death he remained loyal to the Romans, and frequently assisted them with men and provisions during the Punic war. He kept up a powerful fleet for defensive purposes, and employed his famous kinsman Archimedes in the construction of those engines that, at a later date, played so important a part during the siege of Syracuse by the Romans.

== Connection to the "eureka" story ==
According to a story told by Vitruvius, Hiero suspected he was being cheated by the goldsmith to whom he had supplied the gold to make a votive crown for a temple. He asked Archimedes to find out if all the gold had been used, as had been agreed. Archimedes, on discovering the principle of displacement needed to measure the density of the crown is said to have shouted "eureka, eureka!" while running naked through Syracuse. Supposedly, it was while noticing the rise in water level when getting in a bath tub that Archimedes realized he could use water-displacement to measure the crown's irregular shape, and in his excitement about the discovery he dashed outside cheering and forgot to dress himself first. Vitruvius concludes this story by stating that Archimedes' method successfully detected the goldsmith's fraud; the smith had indeed taken some of the gold and substituted silver instead.

== Legacy and honors ==
A picture of the prosperity of Syracuse during his rule is given in the sixteenth idyll of Theocritus. During the reign of Hieron II, various forms of architectural decoration were introduced in Sicily, which are summarised as ‘Hieronic architecture’. Contrary to some assumptions in scholarship, however, there is no evidence that these stylistic innovations were the result of a central programme on Hieron's part to legitimise his rule.

In the 16th century treatise The Prince (Chapter 6), Machiavelli cites Hiero as an example of someone who rose to princely power from previously being a private individual, putting him in similar ranks with Moses, Cyrus, Theseus, and Romulus.

== Bibliography ==
- Caven, Brian M. (2012). "Hieron (2) II, tyrant and king of Syracuse, c. 271–216 BCE". In Hornblower, Simon; et al. (eds.). The Oxford classical dictionary (4th ed.). Oxford University Press. doi:10.1093/acrefore/9780199381135.013.3092. ISBN 978-0-19-954556-8. OCLC 959667246.

Preceded by: Controlled by Pyrrhus of Epirus	Tyrant of Syracuse; 275 BC – 215 BC	Succeeded by: Hieronymus
