= Zhanguo zonghengjia shu =

Set of ancient Chinese silk manuscripts

Zhanguo zonghengjia shu (simplified Chinese: 战国纵横家书; traditional Chinese: 戰國縱橫家書; pinyin: Zhànguó zònghéngjiā shū; Wade–Giles: Chan-kuo tsung-heng-chia shu), translatable as Documents of the Warring States strategists of alliances, or Documents of the Warring States school of vertical and lateral [alliances], etc., is a collection of silk manuscripts (bóshū 帛書) discovered in 1973 in the Mawangdui tombs near Changsha, Hunan Province, China. The text is closely related to the transmitted work Zhanguo ce (Strategies of the Warring States) and constitutes an important source for the study of political thought and diplomatic practices during the Warring States period.

== Discovery ==
The Zhanguo zonghengjia shu was unearthed in 1973 during archaeological excavations of the Mawangdui Han tombs (马王堆汉墓). The manuscript was written on silk and forms part of the wider corpus of Mawangdui silk texts. Its title may also be translated as “Book of the School of Diplomacy of the Warring States period.” Of the 27 stories discovered there, 16 are not transmitted in the Liu Xiang version of the Zhanguo ce, but 11 stories were found to be similar to the contents in Zhanguo ce and the Records of the Grand Historian (Shiji) by the Han historian Sima Qian.

== Content ==
The text records the activities, letters, and persuasive speeches of the Zonghengjia (纵横家/縱橫家, one of the "nine mainstream schools of the ten schools of thought"; Chinese: 九流十家), a group of political strategists known for their expertise in diplomatic persuasion and alliance-building. These strategists specialized in the techniques of hezong-lianheng (simplified Chinese: 合纵连横; traditional Chinese: 合縱連橫; pinyin: hézòng-liánhéng), i.e. vertical and horizontal alliances in the Warring States period. The Mawangdui manuscript preserves sixteen chapters associated with vertical alliance diplomacy. The material focuses on rhetorical strategies, political negotiation, and interstate relations during the Warring States period.

== Relationship to Zhanguo ce ==
The received text of Zhanguo ce primarily records the activities of the "vertical " and " horizontal " alliances (zonghengjia) and their methods of diplomatic persuasion. The Zhanguo zonghengjia shu discovered at Mawangdui is similar in content to the transmitted Zhanguo ce but differs in wording, structure, and selection of material. These differences give the silk manuscript significant value as a historical source and provide insight into the textual transmission of Warring States political literature. The Bibliographical treatise (Yiwenzhi) of the Book of Han (Hanshu) is indicating that only a portion of this tradition has survived.

== Historical significance ==
As a manuscript predating the received versions of Zhanguo ce, the Zhanguo zonghengjia shu is an important primary source for understanding Warring States diplomacy, rhetoric, and political strategy. Its preservation of letters and speeches attributed to Su Qin contributes to the study of early Chinese political persuasion and interstate relations.

== Publication ==
The Mawangdui silk manuscript was first published by the Cultural Relics Publishing House (Wenwu) under the title Zhanguo zonghengjia shu (战国纵横家书). This edition was used, for example, of the Hanyu da zidian (HYDZD). In Taiwan an edition was published in 1977 under the title Boshu Zhanguo ce 帛書戰國策 (Silk manuscript of the Strategies of the Warring States).

A new edition announced by the publisher Zhonghua in 2025 offers, in addition to a complete translation into modern Chinese (by Zhang Jing 张景) with commentary, a comparative analysis of the texts alongside relevant passages from the Strategies of the Warring States, the Records of the Grand Historian, the Han Feizi , and other works.

== See also ==
- School of Diplomacy (Zenghengjia)
- Strategies of the Warring States (Zhanguo ce)
- Strategy-of-the-Warring-States-Period School (in German)

== Bibliography ==
- Zhanguo zonghengjia shu 战国纵横家书. Wenwu chubanshe, Peking 1976
- Boshu Zhanguo ce 帛書戰國策. 河洛圖書出版社 1977 (Taiwan)
- Zhang Jing 张景 / Zhang Songhui 张松辉 (译注): Zhanguo zonghengjia shu 战国纵横家书. 中华书局 2025. 中华经典名著全本全注全译丛书, ISBN 978-7-101-17179-2 (book.douban.com)
- Tsien, Tsuen-hsuin (1993). "Chan Kuo Ts'e 戰國策". In Loewe, Michael (ed.). Early Chinese Texts: A Bibliographical Guide (PDF). Berkeley: Society for the Study of Early China; Institute of East Asian Studies, University of California Berkeley. pp. 1–11. ISBN 1-55729-043-1. (section: Newly discovered manuscripts of Chan kuo documents)
- Zhongguo zhexue da cidian 中国哲学大辞典. Zhang Dainian 张岱年 (ed.). Shanghai 上海: Shanghai cishu chubanshe 上海辞书出版社 2010.
- Hanyu da zidian 汉语大字典 [Dictionary of Chinese Characters]. 1993 (one-volume edition)
