= School of Naturalists =

Classical Chinese school of thought

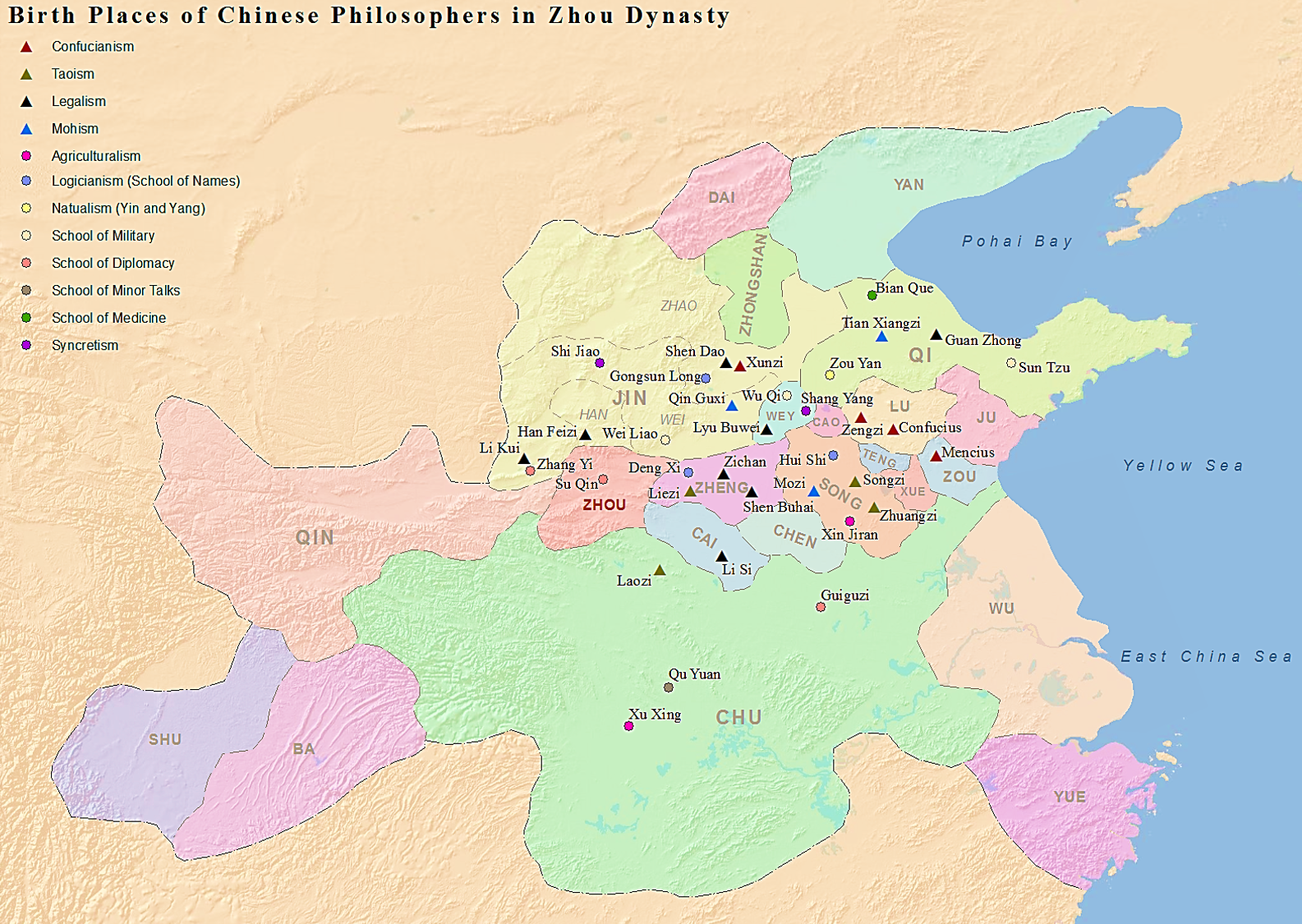
The birthplaces of notable Chinese philosophers from the Hundred Schools of Thought during the Zhou dynasty. Philosophers of Naturalist are marked by circles in yellow.

The School of Naturalists or the School of Yin-Yang (simplified Chinese: 阴阳家; traditional Chinese: 陰陽家; pinyin: Yīnyángjiā; Wade–Giles: Yin-yang-chia; lit. 'School of Yin-Yang') was a Warring States-era philosophy that synthesized the concepts of yin-yang and the Five Elements. It was one of the Nine Schools of Thought.

== History ==
The School of Naturalists did not have any one ethos and came from separate schools.

K.C. Hsiao believed that they were an off-shoot of Confucianism, but the discovery of the Mawangdui Silk Texts includes various Daoistic texts.

== Overview ==
Chinese philosopher Zou Yan (鄒衍; 305 – 240 BCE) is considered the founder of the school, and is best known as the representative thinker of the Yin and Yang School (or School of Naturalists) during the Hundred Schools of Thought era in Chinese philosophy. Zou Yan was a noted scholar of the Jixia Academy in the state of Qi. Joseph Needham, a British biochemist and sinologist, describes Zou as "The real founder of all Chinese scientific thought." His teachings combined and systematized two current theories during the Warring States period: Yin-Yang and the Five Elements/Phases (metal, wood, water, fire, and earth).

His theory attempted to explain the universe in terms of basic forces in nature: the complementary agents of yin (dark, cold, female, negative) and yang (light, hot, male, positive) and the Five Elements or Five Phases (metal, wood, water, fire, and earth).

In its early days, this theory was most strongly associated with the states of Yan and Qi. In later periods, these epistemological theories came to hold significance in both philosophy and popular belief. This school was absorbed into the alchemic and magical dimensions of Taoism as well as into the Chinese medical framework. The earliest surviving recordings of this are in the Ma Wang Dui texts and Huang Di Nei Jing.

During the Han dynasty, the concepts of the school were integrated into Confucian ideology, with Zhang Cang (253–152 BCE) and Dong Zhongshu (179–104 BCE) being the chief instrumental figures behind this process.

== See also ==
- Metaphysical naturalism
