= Hundred Schools of Thought =

Chinese philosophy during the Eastern Zhou

Chinese name
- Traditional Chinese: 諸子百家
- Simplified Chinese: 诸子百家
Transcriptions
Standard Mandarin
- Hanyu Pinyin: Zhūzǐ Bǎijiā
- Bopomofo: ㄓㄨ ㄗˇ ㄅㄞˇ ㄐㄧㄚ
- Wade–Giles: Chu^{1}-tzŭ^{3} Pai^{3}-chia^{1}
- IPA: [ʈʂú.tsɹ̩̀ pàɪ.tɕjá]
Wu
- Romanization: Tsoe tzy ba' ga
Yue: Cantonese
- Yale Romanization: Jyūjí Baakgā
- Jyutping: zyu1 zi2 baak3 gaa1
- IPA: [tsy˥ tsi˧˥.pak̚˧ ka˥]
Southern Min
- Tâi-lô: Tsu-tsú Pah-ka

Vietnamese name
- Vietnamese alphabet: Bách Gia Chư Tử
- Chữ Hán: 諸子百家

Korean name
- Hangul: 제자백가
- Hanja: 諸子百家
Transcriptions
- Revised Romanization: Jejabaekga
- McCune–Reischauer: Chejabaekka

Japanese name
- Kanji: 諸子百家
- Kana: しょしひゃっか
Transcriptions
- Romanization: Shoshi Hyakka

The Hundred Schools of Thought (Chinese: 諸子百家) were philosophies and schools that flourished during the late Spring and Autumn period and Warring States period (c. 500 – 221 BC). The term was not used to describe these different philosophies until Confucianism, Mohism, and Legalism were created. The era in which they flourished was one of turbulence in China, fraught with chaos and mass militarization, but where Chinese philosophy was developed and patronized by competing bureaucracies. This phenomenon has been called the Contention of a Hundred Schools of Thought.

The philosophies that emerged during this period have profoundly influenced East Asian culture and societies. The intellectual landscape of this era was characterized by itinerant scholars, who were often employed by various state rulers as advisers on the way of government, war, and diplomacy. Often, members and traditions of the same school had little in common other than the same influential figure that their beliefs were based on. This period ended with the rise of the imperial Qin dynasty and the subsequent burning of books and burying of scholars as part of an ideological suppression effort by Qin Shi Huang and Li Si.

== In the Records of the Grand Historian ==
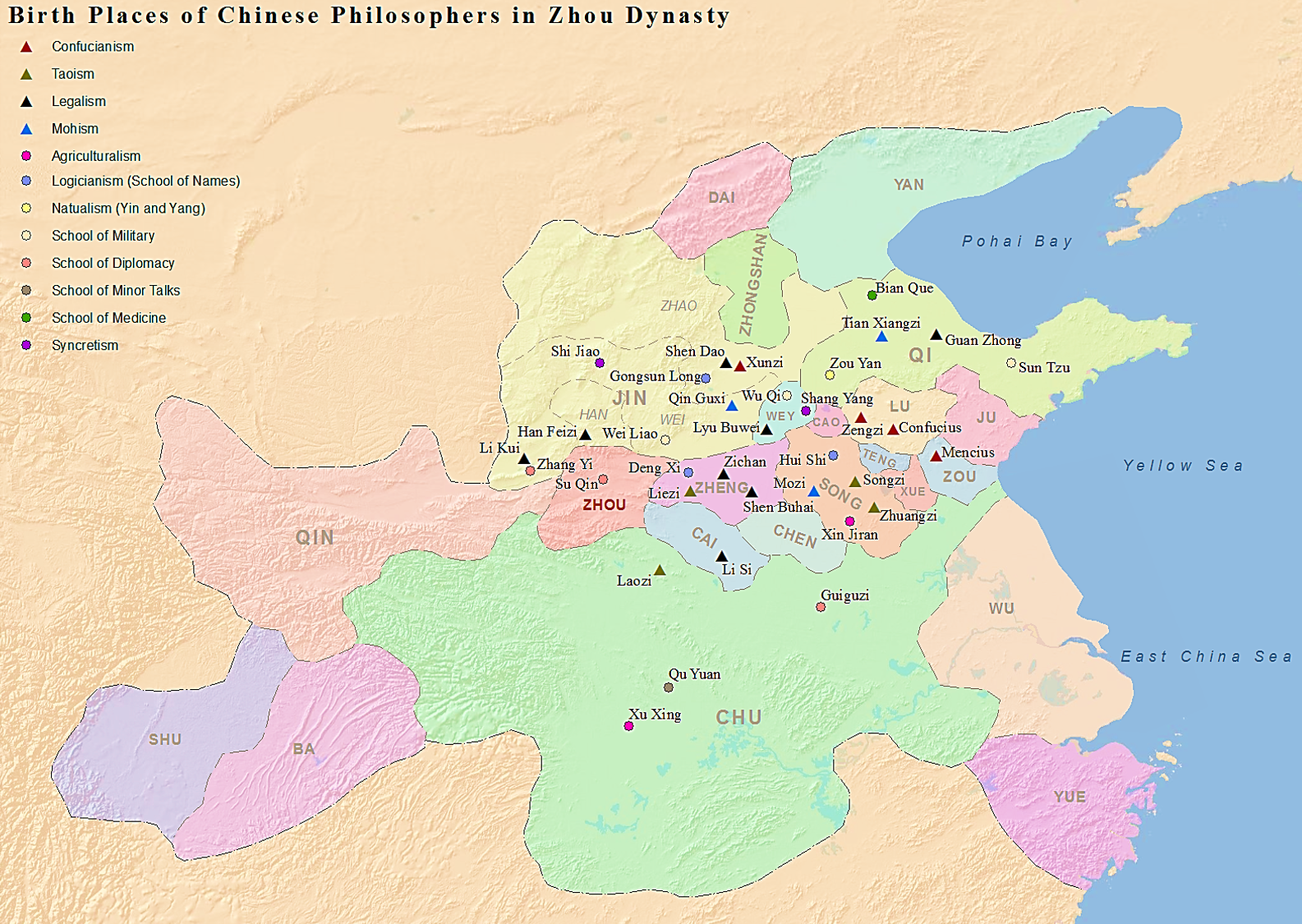
The birthplaces of notable Chinese philosophers from the Hundred Schools of Thought during the Zhou dynasty

A traditional source for this period is the Records of the Grand Historian by Sima Qian. Its autobiographical section describes several schools of thought.

=== Confucianism ===
Confucianism is arguably the most enduring body of thought on Chinese life. Its written legacy lies in the Confucian classics, which later became the foundation of traditional society. Confucius (551–479 BC) looked back to the earlier days of the Xia, Shang, and Zhou dynasties for an ideal sociopolitical order.

He believed that the only effective system of government necessitated prescribed relationships for each individual: "Let the ruler be a ruler and the subject a subject." He contended that a king must be virtuous in order to rule the state properly. To Confucius, the functions of government and social stratification were facts of life to be sustained by ethical values. His ideal human was the junzi, which is translated as 'gentleman' or 'superior person'.

Mencius (371–289 BC) formulated his teachings directly in response to Confucius. The effect of the combined work of Confucius, the codifier and interpreter of a system of relationships based on ethical behavior, and Mencius, the synthesizer and developer of applied Confucianist thought, was to provide traditional Chinese society with a comprehensive framework by which to order virtually every aspect of life.

There were many accretions to the body of Confucian thought, both immediately and over the millennia, from within and without the Confucian school. Interpretations adapted to contemporary society allowed for flexibility within Confucianism, while the fundamental system of modeled behavior from ancient texts formed its philosophical core.

Diametrically opposed to Mencius, in regards to human nature, was the interpretation of Xunzi (c. 300 – 237 BC), another Confucian follower. Xunzi preached that man is not innately good; he asserted that goodness is attainable only through training one's desires and conduct.

=== Legalism ===
Legalist doctrine was formulated by Li Kui, Shang Yang (d. 338 BC), Han Fei (d. 233 BC), and Li Si (d. 208 BC), who maintained that human nature was incorrigibly selfish; accordingly, the only way to preserve the social order was to impose discipline from above, and to see to a strict enforcement of laws. The Legalists exalted the state above all, seeking its prosperity and martial prowess over the welfare of the common people.

Legalism greatly influenced the philosophical basis for the imperial form of government. During the Han dynasty, the most practical elements of Confucianism and Legalism were taken to form a sort of synthesis, marking the creation of a new form of government that would remain largely intact until the late 19th century, with continuing influence into the present.

=== Taoism ===
Taoism developed into the second most significant stream of Chinese thought. Its formulation is often attributed to the legendary sage Laozi. The focus of Taoism is on the individual within the natural realm, rather than the individual within society. Accordingly, the goal of life for each individual is seeking to adjust oneself and adapting to the rhythm of nature (and the Fundamental) world, to follow the Way (Tao) of the universe, and to live in harmony.

In many ways the opposite of Confucian morality, Taoism was for many of its adherents a complement to their ordered daily lives. A scholar serving as an official could usually follow Confucian teachings, but in retirement might seek harmony with nature as a Taoist recluse. Politically, Taoism advocates for rule through inaction, and avoiding excessive interference.

=== Mohism ===
Mohism was developed by followers of Mozi (c. 470 – c. 391 BC). Though the school did not survive through the Qin dynasty, Mohism was seen as a major rival of Confucianism in the period of the Hundred Schools of Thought. Its philosophy rested on the idea of 'impartial care' (兼愛; jiānài): Mozi believed that "everyone is equal before heaven", and that people should seek to imitate heaven by engaging in the practice of collective love.

This is often translated as 'universal love', which is misleading as Mozi believed that the essential problem of human ethics was an excess of partiality in compassion, not a deficit in compassion as such. His aim was to re-evaluate behavior, not emotions or attitudes. His epistemology can be regarded as primitive materialist empiricism. He believed that human cognition ought to be based on one's perceptions – one's sensory experiences, such as sight and hearing – instead of imagination or internal logic, elements founded on the human capacity for abstraction.

Mozi advocated frugality, condemning the Confucian emphasis on ritual and music, which he denounced as extravagant. He regarded offensive warfare as wasteful and advocated pacifism or at the most, defensive fortification. The achievement of social goals, according to Mozi, necessitated the unity of thought and action. His political philosophy bears a resemblance to divine-rule monarchy: the population ought always to obey its leaders, as its leaders ought always to follow the will of heaven.

Mohism might be argued to have elements of meritocracy: Mozi contended that rulers should appoint officials by virtue of their ability instead of their family connections. Although popular faith in Mohism had declined by the end of the Qin dynasty, its views are said to be strongly echoed in Legalist thought.

=== School of Naturalists ===
The School of Naturalists was a philosophy that synthesized the concepts of yin and yang and the Five Elements; Zou Yan is considered the founder of this school. His theory attempted to explain the universe in terms of basic forces in nature: the complementary agents of yin (dark, cold, wet, passive, contracting, negative) and yang (light, hot, dry, active, expanding, positive) and the Five Elements or Five Phases (water, fire, wood, metal, and earth).

In its early days, this theory was most strongly associated with the states of Yan and Qi. In later periods, these epistemological theories came to hold significance in both philosophy and popular belief. This school was absorbed into Taoism's alchemic and magical dimensions as well as into the Chinese medical framework. The earliest surviving recordings of this are in the Mawangdui Silk Texts and Huangdi Neijing.

=== School of Names ===
The School of Names grew out of Mohism, and focused on definitions and logic. It is said to have parallels with that of the Ancient Greek sophists or dialecticians. Its most notable member was Gongsun Long.

== In the Book of Han ==
In addition to the above six major philosophical schools within the Hundred Schools of Thought, the "Yiwenzhi" of the Book of Han adds four more into the Ten Schools (十家; Shijia).

=== School of Diplomacy ===
The School of Diplomacy, also known as the School of Vertical and Horizontal Alliances, refers to a set of military and diplomatic strategies employed during the Warring States period to maintain a balance of power between the dominant Qin state and other mid-sized powers. Adherents of this school travelled between states to lobby rulers to join either the "vertical" or "horizontal" alliances, often motivated by personal gain rather than loyalty to any particular ruler or principle. Their mastery of persuasive techniques is documented in the Annals of the Warring States, which had a lasting influence on subsequent historical writing.

=== Agriculturalism ===
Agriculturalism was an early agrarian social and political philosophy that advocated peasant utopian communalism and egalitarianism. The philosophy is founded on the notion that human society originates with the development of agriculture, and societies are based upon "people's natural propensity to farm."

The Agriculturalists believed that the ideal government, modeled after the semi-mythical governance of Shennong, is led by a benevolent king, one who works alongside the people in tilling the fields. The Agriculturalist king is not paid by the government through its treasuries; his livelihood is derived from the profits he earns working in the fields, not his leadership.

Unlike the Confucians, the Agriculturalists did not believe in the division of labour, arguing instead that the economic policies of a country need to be based upon an egalitarian self sufficiency. The Agriculturalists supported price fixing, in which all similar goods, regardless of differences in quality and demand, are set at exactly the same, unchanging price. For example, Mencius once criticized its chief proponent Xu Xing for advocating that rulers should work in the fields with their subjects. One of Xu's students is quoted as having criticized the duke of Teng in a conversation with Mencius by saying:

A worthy ruler feeds himself by ploughing side by side with the people, and rules while cooking his own meals. Now Teng on the contrary possesses granaries and treasuries, so the ruler is supporting himself by oppressing the people.

=== Syncretism ===
Syncretism integrated teachings from different schools; for instance, Lü Buwei found scholars from different schools to write a book called Lüshi Chunqiu cooperatively. This school tried to integrate the merits of various schools and avoid their perceived flaws. The Shizi (c. 330 BC) is the earliest textual example of the Syncretic School.

== Unlisted schools ==
These schools were not listed in the Book of Han, but had substantial influence.

=== School of the Military ===
The School of the Military (兵家; Bingjia) that often studied and discussed what westerners called the philosophy of war. Some of them studied warfare and strategy, others focused on kinds and skills of weapons. Sun Tzu and Sun Bin were influential leaders. Some of their famous works are The Art of War and Sun Bin's Art of War.

The Art of War ascribes supernatural elements to good generalship, such as the intertwining of the four seasons with Tian, which is also yin and yang.

Their theories later influenced China and East Asia more broadly. These classical texts have received great interest among contemporary interpreters, some of whom have applied it to military strategy, the martial arts, and modern business.

=== Yangism ===
Yangism was a form of ethical egoism founded by Yang Zhu. It was once widespread but fell to obscurity before the Han dynasty. Due to its stress on individualism, it influenced later generations of Taoists.

=== School of the Medical Skills ===
The School of the Medical Skills (方技家; Fangjijia) is a school which studied medicine and health. Bian Que and Qibo were well-known scholars. Two of the earliest and existing Chinese medical works are the Huangdi Neijing and the Han-era Shanghan Lun.

=== Five Agents School ===
The Five Agents School was another predecessor to the School of Naturalists (or the School of Yin-yang), which incorporated its ideas.

"The Five Agents schooled viewed five primal elements as active cosmic agents engaged in interaction and change." These five elements were the wuxing, a force that "integrated life and the universe."

== See also ==
- Axial Age
- Hellenistic philosophy
- Jixia Academy
