= Taisu =

The Taisu (Chinese: 太素; pinyin: Tàisù), or Grand Basis, compiled by Yang Shangshan (楊上善), is one of four known versions of the Huangdi Neijing (Yellow Emperor's Inner Canon), the other three being the Suwen, the Lingshu, and the partially extant Mingtang (明堂 "Hall of Light").

== Time of compilation ==
On the basis of Yang Shangshan's official title at the time of compilation, Nathan Sivin argues that the Taisu was written in 656 or later, most likely under the reign of emperor Gaozong (mid-7th century) of the Tang dynasty, and that Yang compiled it from fragments of one or several post-Han versions of the Neijing.

Historian of medicine Qian Chaochen, who had once claimed that Yang Shangshan died under the Sui dynasty (late 6th century), is now arguing that because Yang referred to the Palace Library as the "Orchid Pavilion" (lantai 蘭臺) in one of his notes, he must have compiled the Taisu sometime between 662 and 670, the few years during which that name was in use.

== Rediscovery ==
Soon lost in China, the Taisu survived in manuscript copies in Japan, where it was re-discovered in the late 19th century. The content of the Taisu overlaps with parts of both the Suwen and the Lingshu. It is an important text to consult when studying the history of Chinese medical ideas.
