= Ilza Veith =

American historian of medicine (1912 – 2013)

- Born: Ilza Hirschmann; May 13, 1912; Ludwigshafen, Empire of Germany
- Died: June 8, 2013 (aged 101); Tiburon, California, US
- Occupation: Historian of medicine
- Known for: Huangdi Neijing (translated, 1949); Hysteria: The History of a Disease (1965)

Academic background
- Education: Johns Hopkins University (MA 1944; PhD 1947)

Academic work
- Discipline: Historian of medicine
- Sub-discipline: East Asian medicine; Psychiatric medicine
- Institutions: University of Chicago (1949–1963); University of California, San Francisco (1964–1979)

Ilza Fanny Veith (born Ilza Hirschmann, May 13, 1912, Ludwigshafen – June 8, 2013, Tiburon, California) was a German-born, American historian of medicine, specializing in the history of psychiatric medicine and East Asian medicine. She taught at the University of Chicago 1949–1963 and the University of California, San Francisco 1964–1979. She was particularly known for her translation and analysis of the Yellow Emperor's Inner Classic (Huangdi Neijing) (1949) and her book Hysteria: The History of a Disease (1965).

== Early life and education ==
Veith was born Ilza Hirschmann in Ludwigshafen on May 13, 1912, the daughter of Jewish parents, the schnapps manufacturer Gustav Hirschmann (1882–1945) and Minna Hertz Hirschmann. From 1934 to 1936 she studied medicine in Geneva and Vienna. In 1935, she married the lawyer Hans von Valentini Veith, whose father Dr. Julius Veith was a Jewish convert to Lutheranism. Hans and Ilza Veith fled in 1935 to Italy and in 1937 emigrated to the US, where they settled in Baltimore. Both of them became naturalized American citizens in 1945.

At the Institute for the History of Medicine of Johns Hopkins University, Ilza Veith graduated in 1944 with an M.A. and in 1947 with a Ph.D. in the history of medicine. She was the first person to receive in the United States a Ph.D. specifically in the history of medicine. At Johns Hopkins, her mentor and doctoral advisor was Henry E. Sigerist, who suggested that her Ph.D. thesis should be the translation and analysis of the Yellow Emperor's Inner Classic (Huangdi Neijing, 黃帝內經).

== Career ==
At the University of Chicago, Ilza Veith taught and did research in the history of medicine. From 1949 to 1951 she was a lecturer; she was an assistant professor from 1953 to 1963. In 1963 she was a Sloan visiting professor at the Meninger School of Psychiatry. At the University of California, San Francisco (UCSF), she was a professor of the history of medicine and vice-chair of the Department of the History of Medicine from 1964 to 1979, when she retired as professor emerita. At UCSF she was also from 1967 to 1979 a professor of the history of psychiatry.

Professor Veith held several lectureships, including the D.J. Davies lectureship (University of Illinois, 1958), the John Shaw Billings lectureship (Indiana University School of Medicine, 1963), the George W. Corner lectureship (University of Rochester, 1970), Logan Clendenning lectureship (University of Kansas School of Medicine, 1971), and the Hideyo Noguchi lectureship (Johns Hopkins University, 1977). In 1974 she gave the American Association for the History of Medicine's Garrison Lecture. She served on the council of the American Association for the History of Medicine from 1958 to 1962 and from 1973 to 1977. She contributed numerous articles to refereed journals and was the author or coauthor of several books. Her 1965 book Hysteria: The History of a Disease is widely read and has become a minor classic. She served on the editorial boards of the Journal of the American Medical Association (JAMA) and the Encyclopedia Britannica.

The Ilza Veith papers include correspondence with a number of noteworthy people, including John Z. Bowers (1913–1993), Francis J. Braceland (1900–1985), Ronald Chen (b. 1931; author of Foreign medical graduates in psychiatry: issues and problems), Morris Fishbein, Chauncey D. Leake, Helen Vincent McClean (1894–1983), Frank William Newell (1916–1998), and John Bertrand deCusance Morant Saunders (1903–1991).

Veith was fluent in five languages: German, French, English, Chinese, and Japanese. In 1975 she received the title of Iguka Hakase (Honorary Doctor of Medical Science) from the Medical School of Juntendo University. By donating a number of her Japanese medical books, she helped to build UCSF's East Asian medicine collection.

== Personal life and death ==
In 1964, Veith suffered a stroke which caused her to be hemiplegic for the remainder of her life. In 1988 the University of California Press published her account of the stroke and its effects on her life: Can You Hear the Clapping of One Hand? Learning to Live with a Stroke. According to Sandra W. Moss, M.D., the book "remains a classic of its genre".

Veith married lawyer and World War I veteran Hans von Valentini Veith on October 20, 1935, and remained married to him until he died on March 9, 1991.

She died on June 8, 2013, at home in Tiburon, California.

== Selected publications ==
=== Articles ===
- Veith, Ilza (1945). "Englishman or Samurai: The Story of Will Adams". The Far Eastern Quarterly. 5 (1): 5–27. doi:10.2307/2049448. JSTOR 2049448.
- Veith, Ilza (1947). "A Japanese picture of leprosy". Bulletin of the History of Medicine. 21 (6): 905–917. PMID 18900344.
- Veith, Ilza (1957). "Medical Ethics Throughout the Ages". Archives of Internal Medicine. 100 (3): 504–512. doi:10.1001/archinte.1957.00260090160022. PMC 3803600. PMID 13457475.
- Veith, Ilza (1958). "Henry E. Sigerist: Orientalist". Journal of the History of Medicine and Allied Sciences. 13 (2): 200–211. doi:10.1093/jhmas/XIII.2.200. JSTOR 24619694. PMID 13525706.
- Veith, Ilza (1960). "Japanese Medicine Today". Archives of Surgery. 81 (3): 467–472. doi:10.1001/archsurg.1960.01300030127016. PMID 13841572.
- Veith, Ilza (1960). "Creation and Evolution in the Far East". Perspectives in Biology and Medicine. 3 (4): 528–546. doi:10.1353/pbm.1960.0029. PMID 13841571.
- Veith, Ilza (1960). "Twin Birth: Blessing or Disaster. A Japanese View". International Journal of Social Psychiatry. 6 (3–4): 230–236. doi:10.1177/002076406000600309.
- Veith, Ilza (1965). "Physician Travelers in Japan". JAMA: The Journal of the American Medical Association. 192 (2): 137–140. doi:10.1001/jama.1965.03080150067016. PMID 14263525.
- Veith, Ilza (1970). "Historical Reflections on Longevity". Perspectives in Biology and Medicine. 13 (2): 255–263. doi:10.1353/pbm.1970.0022. PMID 4907081.
- Veith, I. (1975). "Sir William Osler—acupuncturist". Bulletin of the New York Academy of Medicine. 51 (3): 393–399. PMC 1749442. PMID 1089020.
- Veith, I. (1976). "Benjamin Rush and the beginnings of American Medicine". Western Journal of Medicine. 125 (1): 17–27. PMC 1237175. PMID 782040.
- Veith, Ilza (1978). "On the Mutual Indebtedness of Japanese and Western Medicine". Bulletin of the History of Medicine. 52 (3): 383–409. JSTOR 44450504. PMID 376011.
- Veith, Ilza (1978). "Psychiatric Foundations in the Far East". Psychiatric Annals. 8 (6): 12–41. doi:10.3928/0048-5713-19780601-04.
- Veith, I. (1980). "Changing concepts of health care: An historian's view". The Western Journal of Medicine. 133 (6): 532–538. PMC 1272426. PMID 7008361.

=== Books and monographs ===
- Huang Ti nei ching su wên = The Yellow Emperor's Classic of Internal Medicine. Berkeley: University of California Press. 2016. ISBN 978-0-520-28826-3. LCCN 2016448367. Chapters 1–34 translated from the Chinese with an introductory study by Ilza Veith; foreword by Linda L. Barnes.
  - Huang Ti nei ching su wên. The Yellow Emperor's Classic of Internal Medicine (1st ed.). Baltimore: Williams & Wilkins. 1949. LCCN 49050263.
  - Huang ti nei ching su wên : The Yellow Emperor's Classic of Internal Medicine (2nd ed.). University of California Press. 1966. LCCN 66021112.
- Zimmerman, Leo M.; Veith, Ilza (1961). Great ideas in the history of surgery. Baltimore, Maryland: Williams & Wilkins. Dover reprint. 1967.
  - 2nd edition. San Francisco: Norman Publishing. 1988. ISBN 978-0-930405-02-1.
- Medicine in Tibet. 1962.
  - Medizin in Tibet. Leverkusen: Bayer. 1960. 44 pages, illustrated.
- Hysteria: The History of a Disease. Chicago: Univ. of Chicago Press, 1965 LCCN 65-24429 OCLC 232683
  - 1st pbk edition. Northvale, N.J.: Jason Aronson. 1993. LCCN 93073986. xvi+301 pages; illustrated.
- Tan, Leong T.; Tan, Margaret Y.C.; Veith, Ilza (1973). Acupuncture Therapy: Current Chinese Practice. Temple University Press.
- Veith, Ilza (January 1988). Can You Hear the Clapping of One Hand?: Learning to Live with a Stroke. University of California Press. ISBN 978-0-520-06077-7. xviii+98 pages.
