= Nine Schools of Thought =

Classical Chinese philosophical schools

The Nine Schools of Thought were the primary schools during the Hundred Schools of Thought period of China during the Eastern Zhou dynasty.

They were:

- Confucianism (as interpreted by Mencius and others),
- Legalism,
- Taoism,
- Mohism,
- Agriculturalism,
- School of Diplomacy,
- the Logicians,
- Sun Tzu's Militarists
- Naturalists

Although only the first three of these went on to receive imperial patronage in later dynasties, doctrines from each influenced the others and Chinese society in sometimes unusual ways. The Mohists, for instance, found little interest in their praise of meritocracy but much acceptance for their mastery of defensive siege warfare; much later, however, their arguments against nepotism were used in favor of establishing the imperial examination system.
