= Guiguzi =

Collection of ancient Chinese texts written between the 3rd century BCE to 3rd century CE

- Chinese: 鬼谷子
- Literal meaning: Sage of Ghost Valley
Transcriptions
Standard Mandarin
- Hanyu Pinyin: Guǐgǔzi
- Wade–Giles: Kuei^{3} Ku^{3} Tzu

Alternative Chinese name
- Traditional Chinese: 捭闔策
- Simplified Chinese: 捭阖策
- Literal meaning: Book of Open-Shut
Transcriptions
Standard Mandarin
- Hanyu Pinyin: bǎihécè

Wang Xu
- Traditional Chinese: 王詡
- Simplified Chinese: 王诩
Transcriptions
Standard Mandarin
- Hanyu Pinyin: Wáng Xǔ
- Wade–Giles: Wang^{2} Hsü^{3}

Pages from a printed edition, from the University of Washington Libraries

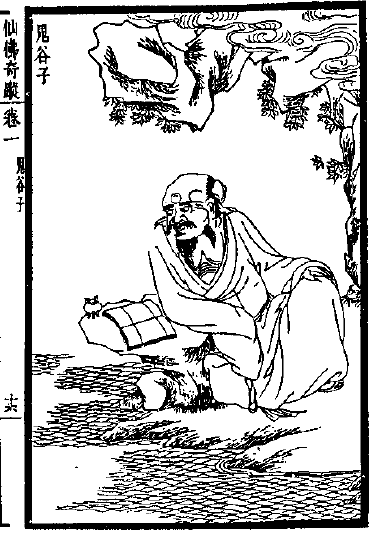
Guiguzi as illustrated in the book《仙佛奇踪》in AD 1602

Guiguzi (鬼谷子), also called Baihece (traditional Chinese: 捭闔策; simplified Chinese: 捭阖策; pinyin: bǎihécè), is a collection of ancient Chinese texts compiled between the late Warring States period and the end of the Han dynasty. The work, between 6,000 and 7,000 Chinese characters, discusses techniques of rhetoric. Although originally associated with the School of Diplomacy, the Guiguzi was later integrated into the Daoist canon.

The set of books is also sometimes called Benjing yinfu qishu (traditional Chinese: 本經陰符七術; simplified Chinese: 本经阴符七术; pinyin: běnjīng yīnfú qīshù).

== Author ==
The author is referred to as Guiguzi, active in the 4th century BC. The name translates literally to 'Sage of Ghost Valley'.

There are many theories about Guiguzi's origin. One hypothesizes him to be from the Zhongyuan dynastic state of Wey (now Henan); the other claims him to be from Yedi (鄴地, now Hebei) in the state of Wei. Other theories attribute his origin to either the city of Dancheng in the state of Chen, or near the county of Yunyang (Shaanxi) on the bank of the Han River.

During the Wei and Jin dynasties, he was regarded as a hermit and a daoshi (Daoist priest) who lived apart from the masses in Ghost Valley (鬼谷). (Note: 袁淑《真隱傳》：「鬼谷先生，不知何許人也，隱居韜智，居鬼谷山，因以為稱。」;《抱朴子》：“老子，无为者也，鬼谷，终隐者也，而著其书，咸论世务。何必身居其位，然后乃言其事乎”)

Guiguzi is also one of the tutelary spirits claimed by the founder of Weixinism, a new religious movement from Taiwan.

== Research ==
There has been considerable speculation about the identity of the author of Guiguzi and the work's overall authenticity. While there has been no final outcome to this discussion, Chinese scholars believe that the compilation reflects a genuine corpus of Warring States period writings on political lobbying. While most writers doubt the assertion that the Guiguzi was written by a single personality, the Shiji does refer to a 'Teacher Guigu' (鬼谷先生) who taught persuaders Su Qin and Zhang Yi. Thus, Teacher Guigu is traditionally considered the founder of the School of Diplomacy (縱橫家; Zònghéngjiā), a school of thought which was particularly interested in rhetoric. Teacher Guigu is also said to have taught famous Warring States generals Sun Bin and Pang Juan.

The association of the name Wang Xu (王詡) is not generally supported. Whereas books I and II are attributed to the same author, Book III is likely an addition by a later author. There is no material in the text to support the view held by some that Guiguzi is a book on military tactics.

== Contents ==
Principles of rhetoric and persuasion taught in Guiguzi include keeping oneself hidden and silent so that the counterpart cannot see what one is doing. Ideally, the counterpart should be convinced that his decisions were made all by himself. This is considered as the ideal course to follow. Coercion or sacrificing oneself to achieve the intended purpose is not recommended.

Compared to western philosophy, parallels can be made between the teachings of Guiguzi with those of Machiavelli.

Guiguzi comprises three books, with chapters on different strategies of observation and persuasion.

Chapter	Title	Chinese title
Book I
1	"Open-Shut"	Bǎi hé 捭闔
2	"Reflect-Respond"	Fǎnyìng 反應
3	"Affect-Fortify"	Nèi Qián 内揵
4	"Mend-Break"	Dǐ Xī 抵巇
Book II
1	"Captivate-Capture"	Fēi Qián 飛箝
2	"Resist-Reconcile"	Wǔ Hé 忤合
3	"Weighing"	Chuāi 揣
4	"Gauging"	Mó 摩
5	"Assessing"	Quán 權
6	"Deploying"	Móu 謀
7	"Decision-Making"	Jué 决
8	"Fundamental Principles"	Fú Yán 符言
9	"Rotation of Small Shots"	Zhuǎn Wán 轉丸
10	"Solution to Disorder"	Qū luàn 胠亂
Book III
1	"The Primary Doctrine on the Seven Arts of the Yin Mystique"	Běn Jīng Yīn Fú Qī Piān 本經陰符七篇
2	"Holding the Pivot"	Chí Shū 持樞
3	"The Central Doctrine"	Zhōng Jīng 中經

== Translations ==
There have been translations of Guiguzi into modern Chinese, German, English, and Russian (see below). Almost all modern annotated texts and western translations rely heavily on the explanations of the texts attributed to the Eastern Jin scholar Tao Hongjing.
