= Zhang Yi (Warring States period) =

Chinese military strategist and philosopher

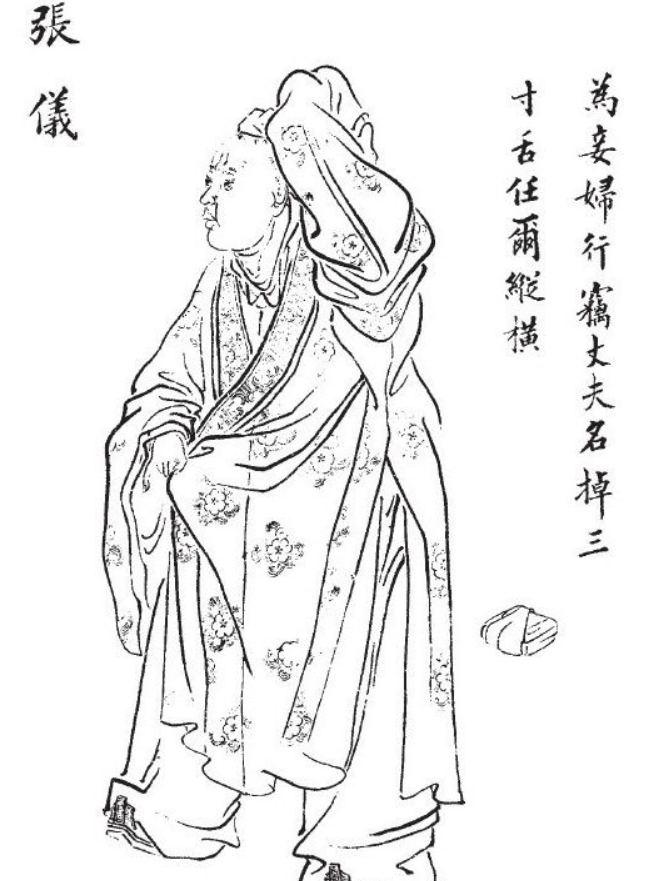

Chancellor
- Monarch: King Huiwen of Qin

Personal details
- Born: 373 BC Wei
- Died: 310 BC Wei
- Occupation: Strategist, diplomat

Zhang Yi
- Traditional Chinese: 張儀
- Simplified Chinese: 张仪
Transcriptions
Standard Mandarin
- Hanyu Pinyin: Zhāng Yí
- Wade–Giles: Chang^{1} I^{2}
Yue: Cantonese
- Jyutping: Zoeng1 Ji4

Zhang Yi (373 BC – 310 BC) was a Chinese military strategist and philosopher. He was born in the Wei state during the Warring States period of Chinese history. He was an important strategist in helping Qin to dissolve the unity of the other states, and hence pave the way for Qin to unify China. He was an advocate of the Horizontal Alliance to combat Su Qin's Vertical Alliance. Both were said to be disciples of Guiguzi and adherents of the School of Diplomacy.

== Biography ==
A native of the State of Wei, Zhang Yi studied under Guiguzi and learnt politics and foreign relations. After Su Qin died, Zhang left Guiguzi, and arrived at the state of Chu.

He received a severe beating at a banquet in the house of a minister of Chu when he was wrongly accused of stealing a gem. It is said that on his return home, he said to his wife, "Look and see if they have left me my tongue." And when his wife declared that it was safe and sound, he cried out, "If I still have my tongue, that is all I want." He then went to the state of Qin in 329 BC, and saw King Hui of Qin, who had earlier rejected Su. King Hui accepted him as a high minister, and in 328 BC he led a successful campaign against his native state, by which Qin acquired a large part of Wei.

At that time, Su Qin's vertical alliance tactic still influenced China, and formed a sort of unity between the states of Han, Zhao, Wei, Chu, Yan and Qi. Zhang offered ideas to King Hui about ways to befriend Wei and Yan in order to break the alliance, which Hui graciously accepted. Hui decided to make him the prime minister.

In 314 BC, civil war broke out in Yan. King Xuan of Qi attacked Yan and murdered the King of Yan. King Huai of Chu, who was the head of the vertical alliance, allied with Qi. Qi-Chu alliance would provoke a great threat to Qin's unification. Hui sent Zhang to weaken the alliance. Zhang first drew the attention of the king by bestowing expensive gifts to his favoured official, Jin Shang. He then struck a deal with Huai. They agreed that Huai would end his alliance with Qi if Qin gave back 600 li of land that Qin had previously captured to Huai. Huai immediately accepted despite his official Chen Zhen's scepticism regarding the trustworthiness of Zhang. When Huai sent a messenger to Xianyang to retrieve the land, Zhang gave Chu six li of his own land, and claimed he had said 'six li' of his own land instead of the six hundred of Qin he had promised. Chu went to war with Qin. Qin defeated Chu and demanded a further six hundred li of land.

Zhang repeatedly negotiated with Han, Zhao, Wei, Chu, Yan and Qi, thereby destroying their relationships with horizontal alliances, and paving the way for Qin's unification of China.

== Death ==
In 311 B.C., King Huiwen of Qin State died and his son Ying Dang, known as King Wu ascended the throne. Zhang Yi was not satisfied with King Wu of Qin State, so he left Qin for Wei where he died in 310 B.C.

== In popular culture ==
In the TV series, The Qin Empire II: Alliance, Zhang Yi was portrayed by actor Yu Entai.
