= Su Qin =

Chinese political strategist in the Warring States period (died 284 BC)

- Traditional Chinese: 蘇秦
- Simplified Chinese: 苏秦
Transcriptions
Standard Mandarin
- Hanyu Pinyin: Sū Qín
- Wade–Giles: Su^{1} Ch‘in^{2}
Yue: Cantonese
- Jyutping: Sou1 Ceon4

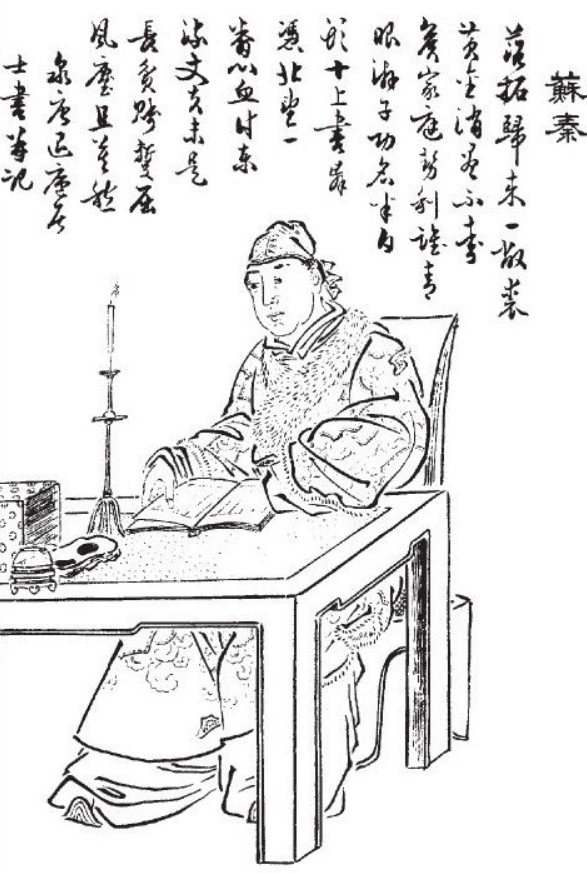
Su Qin

Su Qin (?–284 BCE) was a Chinese political consultant and philosopher who was an influential political strategist during the Warring States period. He was born in Chengxuan Village, Luoyang, in present-day Henan Province. According to legend Su Qin was a disciple of Guiguzi, one of the major adherents of the School of Diplomacy. He was the chief advocate of the "Vertical Alliance" (Chinese: 合纵; pinyin: Hézòng, which sought to create an alliance of the other states against the state of Qin. At his most brilliant, Su Qin persuaded the leaders of the six kingdoms of Qi, Chu, Yan, Han, Zhao and Wei to unite against the Qin state through the use of his splendid rhetoric and thereafter wore robes decorated with the insignia of the six states.

The opposing theory, "Horizontal Alliance" (Chinese: 連横; pinyin: Líanhéng) promoted by Zhang Yi, supported bilateral alliances with Qin. The allies of the Vertical Alliance advanced on the State of Qin but were easily defeated due to internal discord between the former enemies. One theory suggests that Su Qin and Zhang Yi mutually reinforced each other's viewpoints in order to achieve their personal goals.

== Education with Guiguzi ==
After finishing his studies with Guiguzi, Su Qin travelled for several years and on his return lamented that "My wife doesn't recognize me as her husband, my sister-in-law doesn't recognize me as her brother-in-law, and my parents don't recognize me as their son!". All these misfortunes he blamed on himself and he thereafter shut himself in his room to study. Years later, when Su Qin returned with full honors following his success with the Vertical Alliance system, his family received him with great reverence, causing him to remark on their change of behavior towards him, leading to the rise of another Chinese idiom which means "a change of attitude from arrogance to respect" (Chinese: 前倨後恭).

== Canvassing the Six States ==
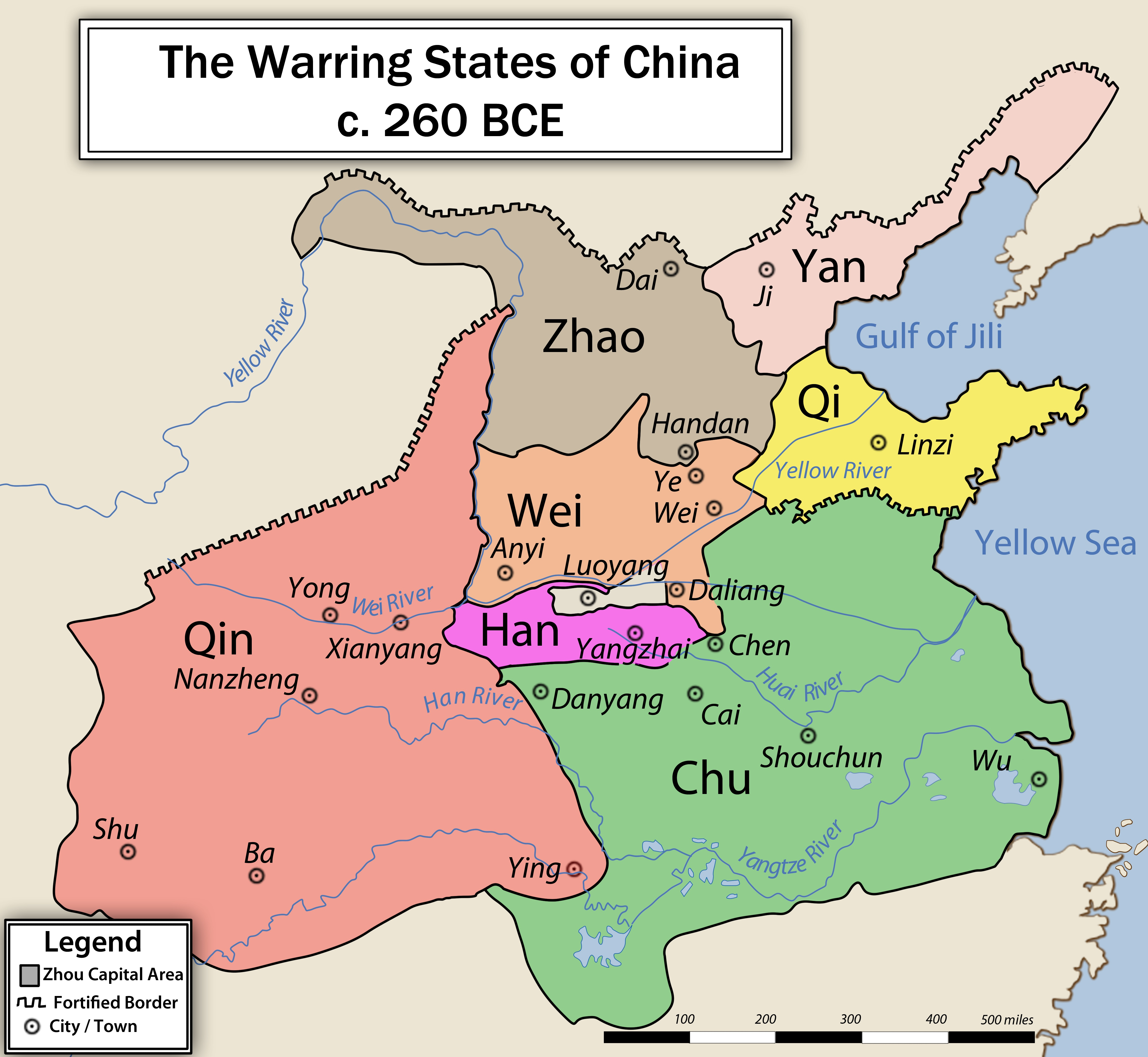
The seven Warring States of Yan, Zhao, Han, Wei, Qi, Chu, Qin c. 260 BC

This period of canvassing is one of the most debated issues in Chinese History. Modern day verification of Su Qin's biography in the Records of the Grand Historian and the Strategems of the Warring States suggests that the content relating to Su Qin in the former work was actually forged by later authors.

A wasted visit to the Qin State
When Su Qin arrived in Qin, the state's ruler Duke Xiao of Qin had just died. His successor King Huiwen of Qin, detested the political reformer Shang Yang of whom the former Duke had been an avid supporter and promptly had him executed. King Huiwen also hated talented foreigners such that Su Qin made no headway.
Negotiations with the Yan State
Su Qin told Marquis Wen, the ruler of the Yan State that the threat posed by the Zhao State was greater than that from the Qin State and that he should form an alliance with the State of Qi. As a result, Su Qin came to be highly regarded in the Yan State.
Negotiations with the Zhao State
Su Qin informed the Marquis of Zhao that his territory lay in a crucial position, slightly offset from the other warring states but ultimately disadvantageous. He suggested that because of this, in an alliance with the other powers, the Zhao State would effectively hold the balance of power. Much impressed by the idea, the Zhao ruler rewarded Su Qin financially and invited him to venture forth and discuss an alliance with the other states.
Negotiations with the Han State
Su Qin angered King Xuan of Han and made him focus on the Vertical Alliance.
Negotiations with the Wei State
Encouraging the selfishness of the Wei officials, Su Qin persuaded King Xiang of Wei to concentrate on the Vertical Alliance.
Negotiations with the Qi State
Su Qin made it clear that it was impossible for the Qin State to cross Zhao and Wei and attack Qi. As a result, to the great shame of Su Qin, the Qi State pledged allegiance to the Qin.
Negotiations with the Chu State
Su Qin told King Wei of the Chu that the other six warring states had already formed an alliance. King Wei refused to join and was inevitably attacked by the State of Qin.

At the end of this period of canvassing, Su Qin became chief administrator of the Vertical Alliance and wore the insignia of the six member nations. After he became famous, he returned to his hometown in a blaze of glory. His parents welcomed him thirty li from home, his sister-in-law crawled like a snake whilst the surprise showed on his wife but she dared not look at him, her former stubbornness having become respect. Once more Su Qin lamented "the parents are poor but not the son". Although already an official of the six nation alliance, Marquis Su of Zhao appointed Su Qin ruler of Wu'an in modern-day Henan Province. According to the records of the Vertical Alliance, the Qin State went into decline and would not dare cross the strategic Hangu Pass for a further fifteen years.

== Defeat of the Vertical Alliance and the death of Su Qin ==
The six nation Vertical Alliance started out with each member state pursuing their own interests and as a result the foundations were shallow. A punitive expedition mounted by the State of Qin against the states of Qi, Wei and Zhao brought the end of the Vertical Alliance; Su Qin left the Zhao State and the alliance disintegrated.

The Qi State took advantage of the Yan State and installed a new monarch, King Yi, as well occupying ten cities which the King of Wei asked Su Qin to get back. Su Qin petitioned the King of Qi thus: "The King of Yan is a kinsman of the Qi State and you have snatched his territory. This is bound to draw the elite troops of the Qin State so you must return these cities!"

After the Marquis Wen of Yan died, King Yi ascended the throne. Su Qin had an affair with the late Marquis’ widow and when King Yi learned about the affair, Su Qin, fearing that he might be punished, subsequently left the Yan State and went to Qi where he obtained an important position from King Xuan. When Xuan died, King Min ascended the throne and Su Qin vied with the ministers of state for the monarch's favor. The ministers tried to assassinate Su Qin and he was seriously injured; the Qi king tried to arrest the culprits but failed to do so. On his deathbed Su Qin gave the King a plan to arrest the assassins: after his death, Su Qin was posthumously accused of treason and his body was torn limb from limb in the town square. This prompted Su Qin's would-be assassins to reveal themselves, and they were subsequently executed. Afterwards, Su Qin's spies leaked information to the Qi State provoking the further hatred and anger of the Yan State.

== Contemporary verification of Su Qin's real identity ==
In 1973, at the Mawangdui in Changsha, a number of silk manuscripts were unearthed. Once they were collated these were dubbed "Treatise on the School of Diplomacy during the Warring States period". The documents consist of a total of twenty-seven chapters divided into three parts. The first, consisting of fourteen chapters, contains Su Qin's correspondence and conversations and provides information from which the historical truth regarding the Strategems of the Warring States may be discerned and errors in Su Qin's biography in the Records of the Grand Historian identified.

According to this written evidence, Su Qin's era followed that of Zhang Yi, during the reign of King Zhao of Yan. In conjunction with Gongsun Yan, Su Qin continued Zhang Yi's mutual confrontation with the Horizontal Alliance of Xi Shou. Su Qin had four older brothers: Su Dai, Su Li, Su Bi and Su Hu. Under his teacher Yu Qi, Su Qin studied all aspects of the operations of the Vertical Alliance and the Horizontal Alliance. He also pored over the books in Yu Qi's collection and found one titled "Minister Yin Fu’s Plan", which Su Qin studied hard for many years, and accepted that its methods would be enough to gain the support of the reigning monarch.

After King Zhao of Yan (312–279 BC) ascended to the throne, the state suffered upheaval and bloodshed so the king, planning to strengthen his state and avenge former humiliation, summoned his sages. Su Qin immediately left Zhou and travelled to the Yan. For King Zhao of Yan, Su Qin carried out his first meritorious service by petitioning King Xuan of Qi to return the ten cities he had previously snatched. The Yan sent a prince as hostage to the Qi with Su Qin acting as envoy. This was in the seventh year of the reign of King Min of Qi, 294 BCE when the government of the Qi was presided over by Lord Mengchang. Su Qin was treated well in Qi and was on friendly terms with Lord Mengchang before his return to Yan.

In 292 BCE, the tripartite forces of Qi, Zhao and Qin were using all their efforts to fight over territory belonging to the State of Song. Su Qin suggested a plan to King Zhao of Yan whilst guaranteeing that he could be "trusted as much as Wei Sheng" and that details of his secret meetings would go with him to the grave.

Thereafter, Su Qin managed to drive a wedge between Qi and Zhao. Qi wiped out Song, which severely weakened Qi such that the Vertical Alliance of the other five states attacked. When Yue Yi defeated Qi, King Min of Qi adjudged Su Qin guilty of dissention and had him torn limb from limb in public. Afterwards Zou Yang said "Su Qin trusted nothing under heaven but he kept his promises to the State of Yan. Sima Qian also commented, "Su Qin undertook a strategy of sowing dissention which led to his execution and all under heaven now mock him".

In 1972, circumstantial evidence unearthed from the number one grave at Yinque Mountain, Linyi Prefecture, Shandong Province provided Han Dynasty bamboo slips inscribed with The Art of War by Sun Tzu. The historian Li Ling mentions this in his simplified version Sun Tzu in the "Espionage" chapter, viz. "When the Zhou flourished, Lu Ya was in Yin" followed by the sentence, "When Yan flourished, Su Qin was in Qi". Li Ling believes that this Sun Tzu is not the same as the one handed down to later generations and is clearly the history of the late Warring States period.

== Cultural reference ==
In the popular manga Kingdom (manga), Li Mu used Su Qin's strategy of alliance to muster a Coalition Army initially against the Qin state, but Qi declined and the coalition ended up being defeated by the Qin armies and some of their commanders were slain in battle. The alliance later fell apart after they decided to attack some Qi territories without accomplishing much.
