= Lingshu Jing =

Ancient Chinese medical text

Lingshu Jing (simplified Chinese: 灵枢经; traditional Chinese: 靈樞經; pinyin: Língshūjīng), also known as Divine Pivot, Spiritual Pivot, or Numinous Pivot, is an ancient Chinese medical text whose earliest version was probably compiled in the 1st century BCE on the basis of earlier texts. It is one of two parts of a larger medical work known as the Huangdi Neijing ("Inner Canon of Huangdi" or "Yellow Emperor's Inner Canon"). The other section, which is more commonly used in Traditional Chinese Medicine and adopted by Japanese Medicine, is known as the Suwen (素問; "Basic Questions").

== History ==
No edition of the Lingshu prior to the 12th century has survived. Most scholars presume that the original title of the Lingshu was either Zhenjing (鍼經; "Classic of Acupuncture" or "Needling Canon") or Jiujuan (九卷; "Nine Fascicles"). They base this conclusion on the following evidence:

- The Huangdi Neijing was listed as a book in 18 juan (卷; "fascicles") in the bibliographical chapter (藝文志; Yiwenzhi) of Ban Gu's 班固 Book of Han (漢書). That chapter was itself based on the Qilue (七略; "Seven Summaries"), a bibliography that Liu Xiang 劉向 (79–8 BCE) and his son Liu Xin 劉歆 (ca. 46 BCE – 23 AD) compiled on the basis of a survey they began in 26 BCE.
- Zhang Zhongjing's preface to his Shanghan zabing lun (傷寒雜病論; "Treatise on Cold Injury and Miscellaneous Illnesses"), written before 220 CE) mentions that he compiled his work on the basis of books that included the Suwen and the Jiujuan (九卷; "Nine fascicles"). In turn, the passages that Huangfu Mi (215-282) attributed to the Jiujuan in his "AB Canon of Acupuncture and Moxibustion" (鍼灸甲乙經; Zhenjiu jiayi jing) all have equivalents in the received edition of the Lingshu.
- In the preface to his AB Canon of Acupuncture and Moxibustion, Huangfu Mi claimed that the book listed as Huangdi Neijing in the Qilue yiwenzhi (七略藝文志) was composed of two different parts: the Suwen ("Basic Questions") and the Zhenjing ("Needling Canon"), each in 9 juan, for a total of 18 juan.
- In the preface to Wang Bing's 762 edition of the Suwen (762 CE), he identified Lingshu as the second of the two texts that comprised the Huangdi Neijing in his time. This was the first instance of the title Lingshu.
- Various titles similar to Zhenjing and Lingshu appeared in the bibliographies of the "Old Book of Tang" (舊唐書; Jiu Tangshu) and the "New Book of Tang" (新唐書; Xin Tangshu), suggesting that many different manuscript editions of a similar book were circulating in Tang times. The titles as seen in the Old Book of Tang were: Huangdi zhenjing (黃帝鍼經; "Yellow Emperor's Canon of Acupuncture") (in 9 juan), Huangdi zhenjiu jing (黃帝鍼灸經; "Yellow Emperor's Canon of Acupuncture and Moxibustion") (12 juan), Huangdi jiuling jing (黃帝九靈經; "Yellow Emperor's Nine-Spirit Canon"), and Yugui zhenjing (玉匱針經; "Canon of Acupuncture of the Golden Casket") (12 juan).
- Early in the 11th century, the Huangdi zhenjing ("Yellow Emperor's Canon of Acupuncture") was among the medical books the Goryeo court imported from Song China.
- In 1067, the editors of the Suwen admitted that "since the Lingshu is no longer complete, we can no longer be sure" whether what Wang Bing called "Lingshu" always referred to the Zhenjing.
- In 1091, the Song court requested a copy of the Zhenjing from Goryeo, which delivered the book in 1093.
- In 1155, a scholar called Shi Song 史崧, "regretting that Lingshu has long been out of circulation," presented his 24-juan edition of that book to the imperial court. His recension claimed to be based on a copy kept in his family, which he compared with fragments cited in other works. His renaming of the "Zhenjing" to "Lingshu" followed Wang Bing.

== Editions ==
All current editions of the Lingshu are based on Shi Song's edition from 1155. The earliest extant edition was made in 1339 and 1340, under the Yuan dynasty, by a publishing house called the Gulin shutang (古林書堂). One copy of this edition is still preserved at the National Library of China (国家图书馆; Guojia tushuguan) in Beijing. The Gulin shutang edition was the earliest known joint edition of Lingshu and Suwen.

== Historical significance ==
Many practitioners through the ages have believed that the name "Lingshu" reflected the complex esoteric nature of the writings. It has been suggested that only someone of sufficient spiritual advancement (i.e. "Ling") could fully understand its true messages.

== Bibliography ==
- Csikszentmihalyi, Mark; Nylan, Michael (2003). "Constructing Lineages and Inventing Traditions Through Exemplary Figures in Early China". T'oung Pao. LXXXIX: 59–99. doi:10.1163/156853203322691329.
- Jeon, Sang-Woon (1974). Science and Technology in Korea: Traditional Instruments and Techniques. The MIT East Asia Science Series. Vol. 4. Cambridge, MA: MIT Press.
- Okanishi, Tameto (1974). Chūgoku isho honzō kō 中國醫書本草考 [A Study of Chinese Medical Books and Materia Medica]. Osaka: Minami Osaka.
- Sivin, Nathan (1993). "Huang ti nei ching" 黃帝內經. In Loewe, Michael (ed.). Early Chinese Texts: A Bibliographical Guide. Berkeley and Los Angeles: University of California Press. pp. 196–215.
- Sohn, Pow-key (1959). "Early Korean Printing". Journal of the American Oriental Society. 79 (2): 99–103. doi:10.2307/595851. JSTOR 595851.
- Zhongguo Zhongyi yanjiu yuan tushuguan 中国中医研究院图书馆 [Library of the China Academy of Traditional Chinese Medicine] (1991). Quanguo Zhongyi tushu lianhe mulu 全國中醫圖書聯合目錄 [National Union Catalog of Chinese Medical Books and Illustrations]. Beijing: Zhongyi guji chubanshe 中医古籍出版社.
