= Zhan Guo Ce =

Ancient Chinese text noting the events of the Chinese warring states period

- Traditional Chinese: 戰國策
- Simplified Chinese: 战国策
- Literal meaning: "Strategies of the Warring States"
Transcriptions
Standard Mandarin
- Hanyu Pinyin: Zhàn Guó Cè
- Gwoyeu Romatzyh: Jann Gwo Tseh
- Wade–Giles: Chan^{4} Kuo^{2} Ts'ê^{4}
- IPA: [ʈʂân kwǒ tsʰɤ̂]
Yue: Cantonese
- Yale Romanization: Jin Gwok Chaak
- Jyutping: Zin^{3} Gwok^{3} Caak^{3}
- IPA: [tsin˧ kʷɔk̚˧ tsʰak̚˧]
Southern Min
- Hokkien POJ: Chiàn Kok Chhek
- Tâi-lô: Tsiàn kok tshik
Middle Chinese
- Middle Chinese: dʒèn kwok tʂʰeak
Old Chinese
- Baxter–Sagart (2014): *tar-s [C.q]ʷˤək [tsʰ](r)ek

The Zhan Guo Ce (W-G: Chan-kuo T'se), also known in English as the Strategies of the Warring States or Annals of the Warring States, is an ancient Chinese text that contains anecdotes of political manipulation and warfare during the Warring States period (5th to 3rd centuries BC). It is an important text of the Warring States period as it describes the strategies and political views of the School of Diplomacy and reveals the historical and social characteristics of the period.

== History ==
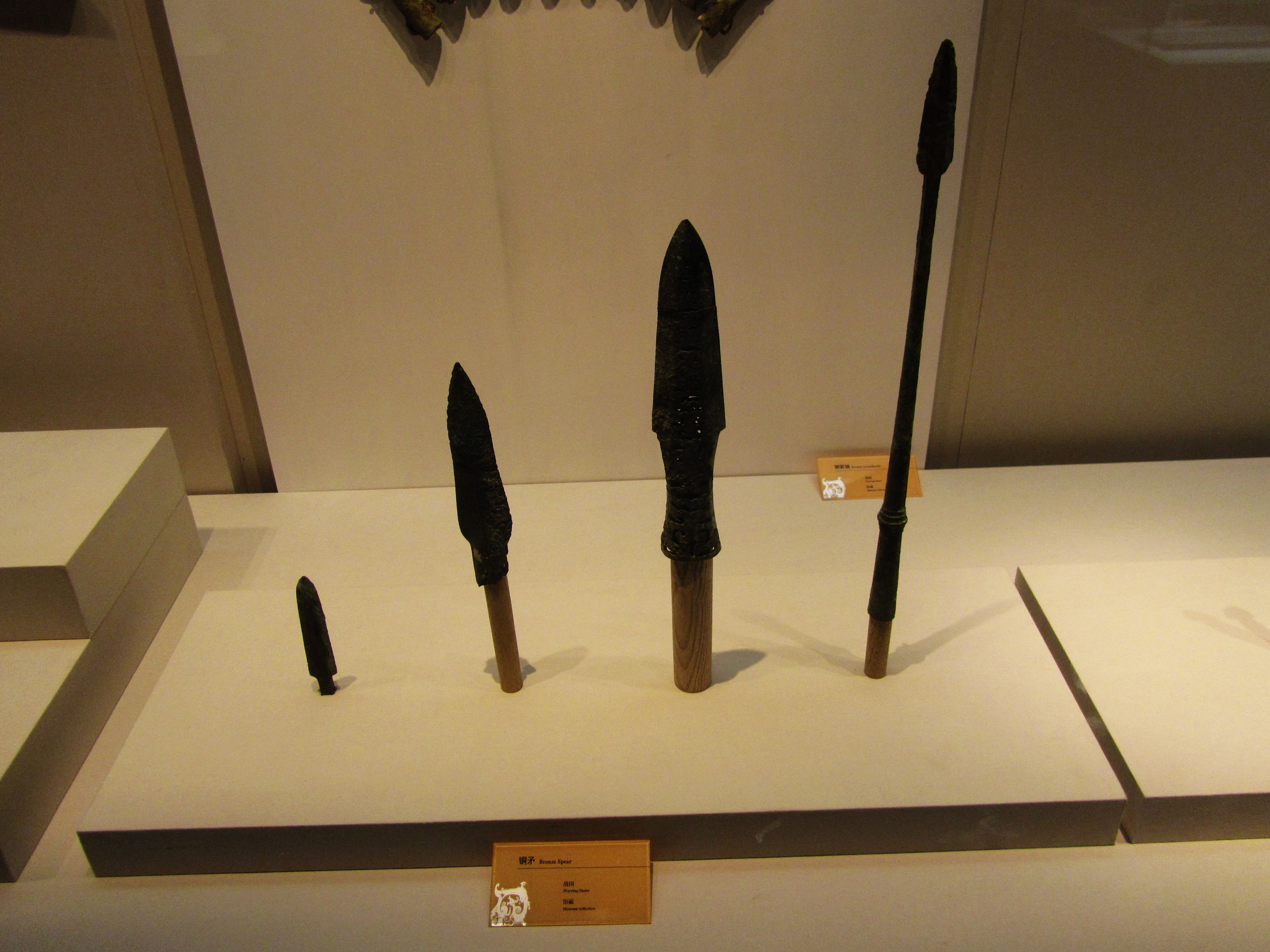
Spears of the Warring States period

The author of Zhan Guo Ce has not yet been verified: it is generally deemed, after Zhang Xincheng, that the book was not written by a single author at one time. It is thought to have been composed by Su Qin and his peers, and was originally compiled by Han dynasty scholar Liu Xiang.

Unlike many of the pre-Qin classics, the authenticity of Zhan Guo Ce, along with the Shijing, Mozi, Yulingzi and Gongsun Longzi had never been questioned since the Western Han period. The earliest to assert the texts were apocryphal scriptures was perhaps the compiler of the Annotated Bibliography of the Complete Library of the Four Treasuries, but he provided no warrant for it. In 1931, Luo Genze put forward an argument that the book was composed by Kuai Tong (蒯通) in his two papers based on six conclusions which he drew, a contemporary of Han Xin. This argument had been seconded by Jin Dejian (1932) and Zu Zhugeng (1937), but by 1939 it was refuted by Zhang Xincheng.

The six versions of written works from the School of Diplomacy were discovered by Liu Xiang during his editing and proofreading of the imperial library collection. Those works of political views and diplomatic strategies from the School of Diplomacy were in poor condition, with confusing contents and missing words. Liu Xiang proofread and edited them into the new book under the title Zhan Guo Ce; it was therefore not written by a single author at one time.

Significant contents of Zhan Guo Ce were lost in subsequent centuries. Zeng Gong of the Northern Song dynasty reclaimed some lost chapters, proofread and edited the modern version. Some writings on cloth were excavated from the Han dynasty tomb at Mawangdui near the city of Changsha in 1973 and edited and published in Beijing in 1976 as Zhanguo Zonghengjia Shu (戰國縱橫家書, "Works from the School of Diplomacy During the Warring States Period)". The book contained 27 chapters, 11 of which were found to be similar to the contents in Zhan Guo Ce and the Records of the Grand Historian. That publication appeared in Taiwan in 1977 as the Boshu Zhanguoce (帛書戰國策). The texts were written in between the style of Seal script and Clerical script. The transcript was probably composed around 195 BC before its burial, as the text tend to avoid using the word bang (邦), the personal name of Emperor Gao of Han, to circumvent naming taboo. According to James Legge's translation of the Book of Rites it shares a story with the Lost Book of Zhou mentioned in the Rites.

== Content ==
The Zhan Guo Ce recounts the history of the Warring States from the conquest of the Fan clan by the Zhi clan in 490 BC up to the failed assassination of Qin Shi Huang by Gao Jianli in 221 BC.

The chapters take the form of anecdotes meant to illustrate various strategies and tricks employed by the Warring States. With the focus thus being more on providing general political insights than on presenting the whole history of the period, there is no stringent year-by-year dating such as that found in the preceding Spring and Autumn Annals. Stories are sorted chronologically by under which ruler they take place, but within the reign of a single king there is no way to tell if the time elapsed between two anecdotes is a day or a year.

The book comprises approximately 120,000 words, and is divided into 33 chapters and 497 sections. The twelve dynasties the strategies pertain to are:

##	Chinese	Translation	Context Identical with Mawangdui Chapters
01	東周策	Strategies of Eastern Zhou	Nil
02	西周策	Strategies of Western Zhou	Nil
03	秦策	Strategies of Qin	Chapter 19/Qin 3:2
04	秦策	Strategies of Qin	Chapter 19/Qin 3:2
05	秦策	Strategies of Qin	Chapter 19/Qin 3:2
06	秦策	Strategies of Qin	Chapter 19/Qin 3:2
07	秦策	Strategies of Qin	Chapter 19/Qin 3:2
08	齊策	Strategies of Qi	Nil
09	齊策	Strategies of Qi	Nil
10	齊策	Strategies of Qi	Nil
11	齊策	Strategies of Qi	Nil
12	齊策	Strategies of Qi	Nil
13	齊策	Strategies of Qi	Nil
14	楚策	Strategies of Chu	Chapter 23/Chu 4:13
15	楚策	Strategies of Chu	Chapter 23/Chu 4:13
16	楚策	Strategies of Chu	Chapter 23/Chu 4:13
17	楚策	Strategies of Chu	Chapter 23/Chu 4:13
18	趙策	Strategies of Zhao	Chapter 21/Zhao 1:9; Chapter 18/Zhao 4:18
19	趙策	Strategies of Zhao	Chapter 21/Zhao 1:9; Chapter 18/Zhao 4:18
20	趙策	Strategies of Zhao	Chapter 21/Zhao 1:9; Chapter 18/Zhao 4:18
21	趙策	Strategies of Zhao	Chapter 21/Zhao 1:9; Chapter 18/Zhao 4:18
22	魏策	Strategies of Wei	Chapter 15/Wei 3:3; Chapter 16/Wei 3:8
23	魏策	Strategies of Wei	Chapter 15/Wei 3:3; Chapter 16/Wei 3:8
24	魏策	Strategies of Wei	Chapter 15/Wei 3:3; Chapter 16/Wei 3:8
25	魏策	Strategies of Wei	Chapter 15/Wei 3:3; Chapter 16/Wei 3:8
26	韓策	Strategies of Han	Chapter 23/Han 1:16
27	韓策	Strategies of Han	Chapter 23/Han 1:16
28	韓策	Strategies of Han	Chapter 23/Han 1:16
29	燕策	Strategies of Yan	Chapter 05/Yan 1:5 and Yan 1:12; Chapter 20/Yan 1:11; Chapter 04/Yan 2:4
30	燕策	Strategies of Yan	Chapter 05/Yan 1:5 and Yan 1:12; Chapter 20/Yan 1:11; Chapter 04/Yan 2:4
31	燕策	Strategies of Yan	Chapter 05/Yan 1:5 and Yan 1:12; Chapter 20/Yan 1:11; Chapter 04/Yan 2:4
32	宋、衛策	Strategies of Song and Wei(Wey)	Nil
33	中山策	Strategies of Zhongshan	Nil

== Evaluation ==
The book does not emphasize the historical facts or fiction, but appears to be an extensive collection of anecdotes with little bearing to the chronological order of chapter and narration. Since the 12th century, it has been widely debated whether the book should be considered a historical documentation from writer Chao Gongwu and Gao Sisun, and there have been attempts to categorize the book into a different genus. This lasted until 1936 where scholars like Zhong Fengnian demonstrated that the book was written as a handbook of diction from the School of Diplomacy, and not intended to be a compilation of historical facts.

The moral aspects have been disputed due to its stress on power politics, warfare, and its conflicts with Confucian ideology. The book appears to overemphasize the historical contributions from the School of Diplomacy, devaluing the book's historical importance.

The book's distinctive style and content broke new ground decoding the tactics of power politics. Its witty and humorous approach, combined with "refined rhetoric and vigorous literary style", makes it a literary gem that surpassed its historical significance.

== Translations ==
- Crump, James I., Jr. (1970, 1996). Chan-Kuo Ts'e. Oxford: Clarendon Press; revised edition, University of Michigan Center for Chinese Studies. ISBN 978-0-89264-122-2
- Crump, J. (2022). Legends of the Warring States: Persuasions, Romances, and Stories from Chan-kuo Ts'e (Michigan Monographs In Chinese Studies Book 83). U OF M CENTER FOR CHINESE STUDIES. ISBN 978-0892641291
- Hu, Mingyuan (2022). Oratory and Democracy in China: Four Dialogues from the Annals of the Warring States. London and Paris: Hermits United. ISBN 978-1-7391156-0-9
- Bonsall, Bramwell Seaton (1920s?). Records of the Warring States . (A typescript translation made while studying for a London University D. Lit.)

== Notes ==
a: See HKUL Digital Initiatives for G. W. Bonsall translation.
