= Qibo =

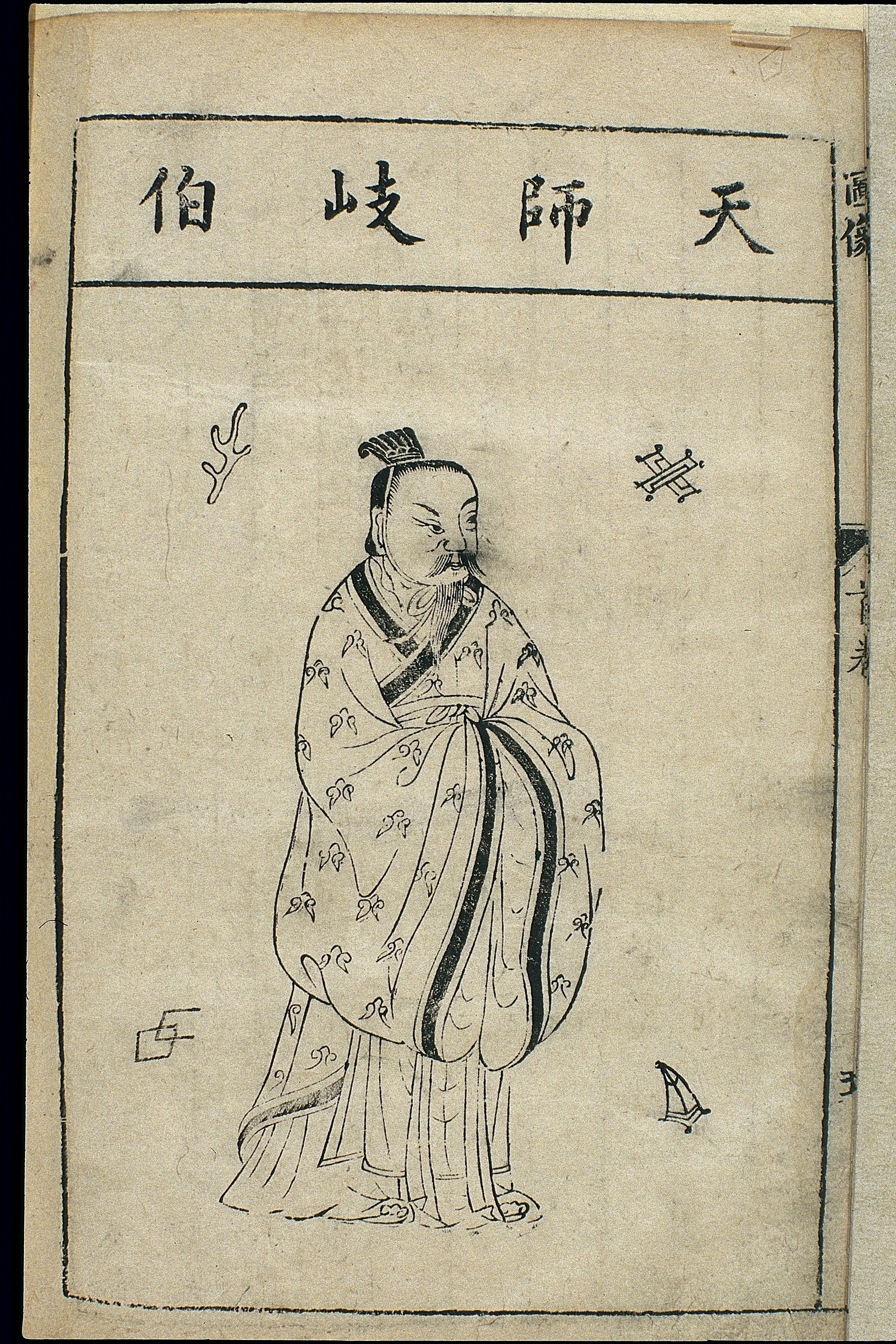
- Qibo as depicted by Gan Bozong, woodcut print, Tang dynasty (618-907)
- Chinese: 岐伯
Transcriptions
Standard Mandarin
- Hanyu Pinyin: Qíbó
- Wade–Giles: Ch'i-po

Qibo (Chinese: 岐伯; pinyin: Qíbó) was a mythological Chinese doctor, employed by the Yellow Emperor (Huangdi) as his minister. It is said that he was enlightened with the knowledge of traditional Chinese medicine by an ethereal being from the heavens.

He was a doctor in shanggu shidai (simplified Chinese: 上古时代; traditional Chinese: 上古時代) in legend. He lived in Beidi (Chinese: 北地, now Qingyang).

It is said that he had learned medicine from some celestial being like Guangchengzi, Chisongzi (Chinese: 赤松子), or Zhongnanzi (Chinese: 中南子). He recognized medicinal herbs in daylight, learned the Tao of health maintenance and mastered jingluo medicine. Zhongnanzi recommended Qibo to the Yellow Emperor, while the Yellow Emperor asked Tao to Guangchengzi in the Kongtong Mountains. Qibo became the chancellor of the Yellow Emperor. He sampled medicinal herbs by the order of the Yellow Emperor. Huangdi Neijing is a book comprising the dialogues regarding medicinal problems between Yellow Emperor and Qibo.
