= Xu Xing (philosopher) =

- 許行
- Born: 372 BC
- Died: 289 BC (aged 82–83)
- Occupation: Philosopher

Philosophical work
- Era: Zhou dynasty
- Region: Teng
- Main interests: Agriculturalism

Xu Xing (Chinese: 許行; Wade–Giles: Hsü Hsing; c. 372 – c. 289 BC) was a Chinese philosopher and one of the most notable advocates of the egalitarian political philosophy of agriculturalism. With a group of followers he settled in the state of Teng in about 315 BC. A disciple of his visited the Confucian philosopher Mencius, and a short report of their conversation discussing Xu Xing's philosophy survives.
