= School of Diplomacy =

Political and military strategy in early China

The School of Diplomacy (simplified Chinese: 纵横家; traditional Chinese: 縱橫家; pinyin: zōng héng jiā; lit. 'School of the Vertical and the Horizontal') refers to a set of military and diplomatic strategies during the Warring States period of Chinese history (476-220 BCE), aiming for power balance among the strongest Qin State and the other weaker states. According to the Book of Han, the school was one of the Nine Schools of Thought (Chinese: 九流; pinyin: Jiǔ Liú). Originated by Guiguzi, the School of Diplomacy's main adherents were Gongsun Yan, Su Qin, Zhang Yi, Xu Pi, Gan Mao, Sima Cuo, Yue Yi, Fan Sui, Cai Ze, Zou Ji, Mao Sui, Li Yiji and Kuai Che as detailed in the Annals of the Warring States.

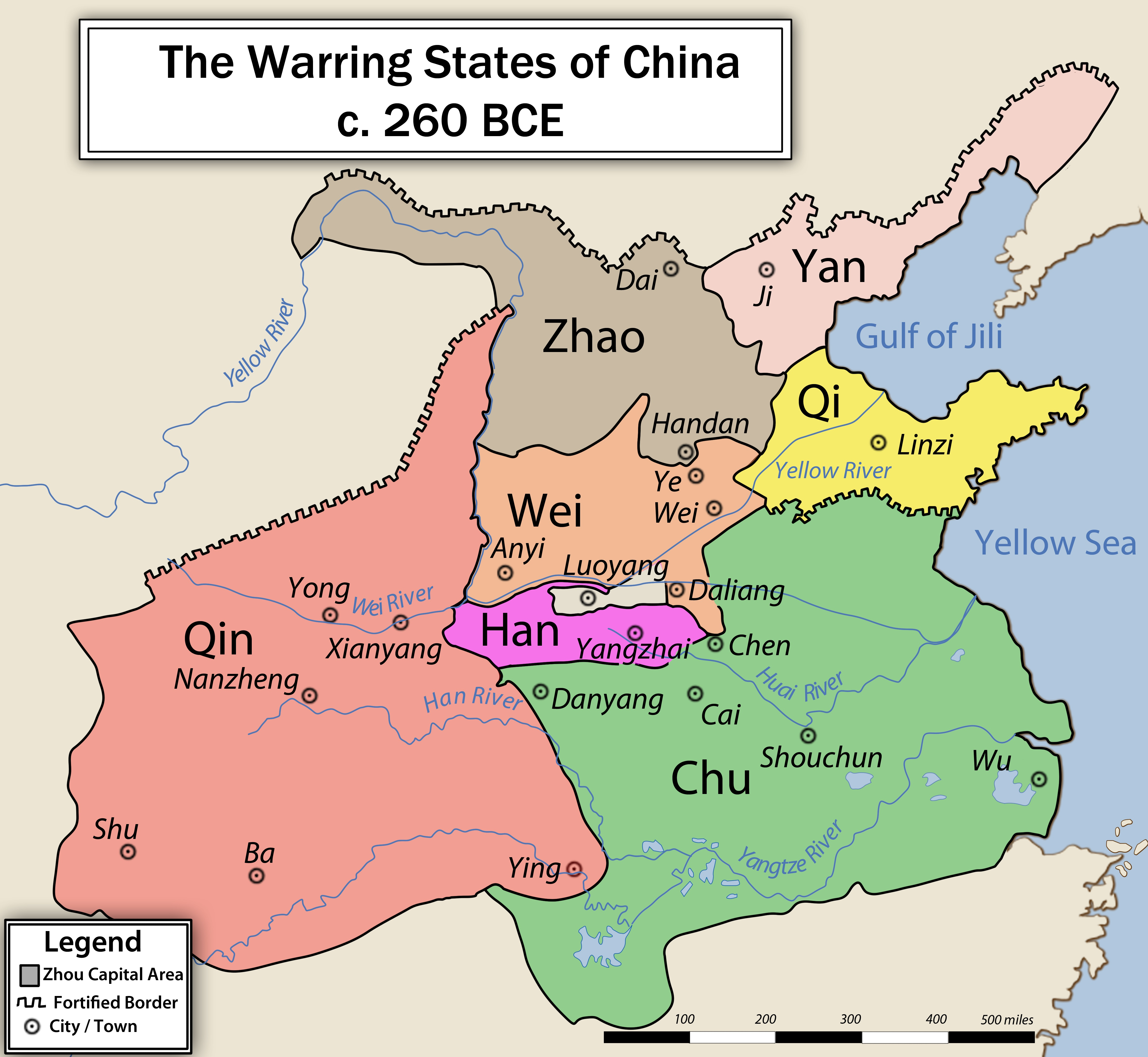
Mapping of the seven states

By the time of the Warring States period, the major contest was between the powerful State of Qin situated in the west, and the other six mid-power, namely Yan, Zhao, Wei, Qi, Chu, and Han. The seven states engaged in a complex series of pacts and military alliances, commonly referred to as the Horizontal Alliance and Vertical Alliance, based on two geographic patterns. The Horizontal Alliance (连横, liánhéng), adopted by Qin, followed a west–east alignment aimed at curbing the coalitions of the other six states. In contrast, the Vertical Alliance (合纵, hézòng) formed a north–south alignment among the six states to block Qin's further expansion. The spokesperson for the Vertical Alliance is Su Qin, while the spokesperson for the Horizontal Alliance is Zhang Yi.

According to the Han Feizi, a Pre-Qin text on Legalist Philosophy, The Vertical Alliance refers to multiple smaller states forming an alliance to collectively counter a superpower, whereas the Horizontal Alliance sees a superpower allying with one of its weaker adversaries to divide and weaken the opposition, enabling it to defeat them individually. In practice, Qin successfully broke apart the anti-Qin Vertical Alliances, conquered the smaller states and eventually rose to domination by the middle of the third century B.C. The diplomatic schemes adopted by Qin include lies, bribery, and espionage.

The school's adherents were an active group of diplomats or persuaders who traveled "tirelessly from state to state", trying to lobby the rulers into one or the other alliances. They did not lock their loyalty to any certain state, and instead, would be collecting ministerial seals simultaneously from multiple states with their mastery of persuasive skills. The anecdotes and rhetoric of these travelling advisers were recorded in the Annals of the Warring States, which, as Watson put it, offers "dubious historical value" as legends and exaggerations obscured historical facts.

== Historical accounts ==
The few principal written records of the School of Diplomacy that exist today are the thirteenth chapter of the Book of Gui or Guiguzi, and the thirty-third chapter of Annals of the Warring States, a well-written rhetorical compendium of the words and actions of the strategists of the School of Diplomacy who were all resourceful, intelligent, aware of the actual situation and gifted in the use of language.

According to Watson, the legends and speeches in the Annals was comparable to the "moral chaos" during the Peloponnesian Wars in Greece. The proposals and schemes were brought up to simply advance self-interests and defeat that of the enemies. Although embarrassing from a Confucian view point, the collection was nonetheless entertaining for its breath of wit and humor.

The sophistication and subtlety of styles manifested by the Annals was influential to later historical writings, the most immediate one being Shiji, the next major historical book written in the Han dynasty.

In 1973, at the Mawangdui in Changsha, a number of silk manuscripts were unearthed. Once they were collated these were dubbed "Treatise on the School of Diplomacy during the Warring States period". The documents consist of a total of twenty-seven chapters divided into three parts. The first, consisting of fourteen chapters, contains Su Qin's correspondence and conversations and provides information from which the historical truth regarding the Strategems of the Warring States may be discerned and errors in Su Qin's biography in the Records of the Grand Historian identified.

== Bibliography ==
- Hui, Victoria Tin-Bor (2005). State formation in ancient China and early modern Europe. Cambridge: Cambridge University press. ISBN 978-0-521-52576-3.
- Lewis, Mark Edward (1999). Loewe, Michael; Shaughnessy, Edward L. (eds.). The Cambridge history of ancient China: from the origins of civilization to 221 B.C. Cambridge, UK; New York: Cambridge University Press. ISBN 978-0-521-47030-8.
- Qi, Haixia (2023), "Balancing in Ancient China", in Acharya, Amitav; Bell, Daniel A.; Bhargava, Rajeev; Xuetong, Yan (eds.), Bridging Two Worlds: Comparing Classical Political Thought and Statecraft in India and China, Comparing Classical Political Thought and Statecraft in India and China, vol. 4 (1 ed.), University of California Press, pp. 267–283, ISBN 978-0-520-39098-0
- Watson, Burton (1962). Early Chinese Literature. The Companions to Asian Studies. New York, NY: Columbia University Press. ISBN 978-0-231-88114-2.
