= Huangdi Neijing =

Han dynasty medical treatise

Huángdì Nèijīng
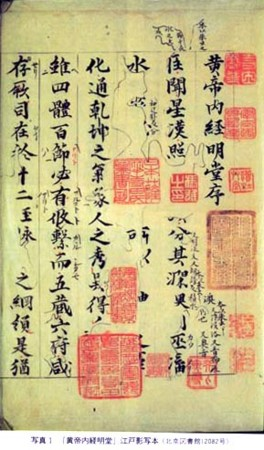
- Japanese manuscript, 14th century
- Original title: 黃帝內經
- Language: Classical Chinese
- Subject: Chinese traditional medicine
- Genre: Medical textbook
- Publication date: Compiled 4th century BC – 3rd century AD
- Publication place: Han China
- Dewey Decimal: 610.951
- LC Class: R127.S93 Y4513
- Original text: 黃帝內經 at Chinese Wikisource

Chinese name
- Traditional Chinese: 黃帝內經
- Simplified Chinese: 黄帝内经
- Literal meaning: Inner Classic of the Yellow Emperor
Transcriptions
Standard Mandarin
- Hanyu Pinyin: Huángdì Nèijīng

Vietnamese name
- Vietnamese: Hoàng Đế nội kinh

Thai name
- Thai: หวงตี้เน่ยจิง

Korean name
- Hangul: 황제내경
Transcriptions
- McCune–Reischauer: hwangje naegyeong

Japanese name
- Kanji: 黄帝内経
Transcriptions
- Romanization: Kōtei Daikei

Huangdi Neijing (Chinese: 黃帝內經), literally the Inner Canon of the Yellow Emperor or Esoteric Scripture of the Yellow Emperor, is an ancient Chinese medical text or group of texts that has been treated as a fundamental doctrinal source for Chinese medicine for more than two millennia. The work comprises two texts—each of eighty-one chapters or treatises in a question-and-answer format between the mythical Yellow Emperor and six of his equally legendary ministers.

The first text, the Suwen (素問), also known as Basic Questions, covers the theoretical foundation of Chinese Medicine and its diagnostic methods. The second and generally less referred-to text, the Lingshu (靈樞; "Spiritual Pivot"), discusses acupuncture therapy in great detail. Collectively, these two texts are known as the Neijing or Huangdi Neijing. In practice, however, the title Neijing often refers only to the more influential Suwen.

Two other texts also carried the prefix Huangdi Neijing in their titles: the Mingtang (明堂; "Hall of Light") and the Taisu (太素; "Grand Basis"), both of which have survived only partially. The book was popular among Taoists.

== Overview ==
The earliest mention of the Huangdi Neijing was in the bibliographical chapter of the Hanshu (漢書) (or Book of Han, completed in 111 CE), next to a Huangdi Waijing (黃帝外經; "Outer Canon of the Yellow Emperor") that is now lost. A scholar-physician called Huangfu Mi 皇甫謐 (215–282 CE) was the first to claim that the Huangdi Neijing in 18 juan 卷 (or volumes) that was listed in the Hanshu bibliography corresponded with two different books that circulated in his own time: the Suwen and the Zhenjing (鍼經; "Needling Canon"), each in 9 juan. Since scholars believe that Zhenjing was one of the Lingshu's earlier titles, they agree that the Han dynasty Huangdi Neijing was made of two different texts that are close in content to the works we know today as the Suwen and the Lingshu.

The "Yellow Emperor's Inner Classic" (黃帝內經; Huangdi Neijing) is the most important ancient text in Chinese medicine as well as a major book of Daoist theory and lifestyle. The text is structured as a dialogue between the Yellow Emperor and one of his ministers or physicians, most commonly Qíbó (岐伯), but also Shàoyú (少俞). One possible reason for using this device was for the (anonymous) authors to avoid attribution and blame.

The Neijing departs from the old shamanistic beliefs that disease was caused by "demonic influences" (邪气) which is to be interpreted as any disease causing element, be it virus, bacteria or carcinogen, which can further be categorised by imbalance in diet, lifestyle, emotions, environment and the premature aging, etc. According to the Neijing, the universe can be represented by various symbols and principles, such as yin and yang (--，—), the wuxing (which must be interpreted as symbols no different than x, y, z or a, b, c in algebra), and qi. These systems of abstraction of natural phenomenon aid our understanding of natural processes of which human health is among. Man is a microcosm that mirrors the larger macrocosm. The principles of yin and yang, the five elements, the environmental factors of wind, damp, hot and cold and so on that are part of the macrocosm equally apply to the human microcosm. Traditional medicine is a way for man to maintain this balance.

== Date of composition ==
Before archeological discoveries at Mawangdui, Hunan, in the 1970s, the work had been dated to between the Warring States period to as late as the Han dynasty (206 BCE–220 CE). However, excavations found medical texts that changed this opinion. Jianmin Li, Vivienne Lo and Donald Harper agree that the systematic medical theory in the Neijing shows significant variance from Mawangdui Silk Texts, which were sealed in a royal tomb in 168 BCE. Because of this, they consider the Neijing to have been compiled after the Mawangdui texts. Historian of science Nathan Sivin (University of Pennsylvania) concluded that the Suwen and Lingshu probably date to the first century BCE, far later than most scholars would have dated it before the discoveries at Mawangdui. Those medical texts also show that it is not one book, "but a collection of diverse writings, many of which disagree and some of which comment on others. He is also of the opinion that (as of 1998) "no available translation is reliable."

They therefore challenge earlier arguments. Celestial Lancets (1980, by Joseph Needham and Lu Gwei-djen) states that the consensus of scholarly opinion is that the Suwen belongs to the second century BCE, and cites evidence that the Suwen is earlier than the first of the pharmaceutical natural histories, the 神農本草經 (Shennong Bencao Jing; "Divine Farmer's Classic of the Materia Medica"). So suggestive are parallels with third and fourth century BCE literature that doubt arises as to whether the Suwen might be better ascribed to the third century BCE, implying that certain portions may be of that date. The dominant role the theories of yin/yang and the five elements play in the physiology and pathology indicates that these medical theories are not older than about 320 BCE.

The German scholar Paul U. Unschuld says several 20th-century scholars hypothesize that the language and ideas of the Neijing Suwen were composed between 400 BCE and 260 CE, and provides evidence that only a small portion of the received text transmits concepts from before the second century BCE. The work subsequently underwent major editorial changes.

Du Fu, a fourteenth-century literary critic, was of the opinion that the Suwen was compiled by several authors over a long period. Its contents were then brought together by Confucian scholars in the Han dynasty era.

== Wang Bing version ==
In 762 CE, Wang Bing finished his revision of the Suwen after labouring for twelve years. Wang Bing collected the various versions and fragments of the Suwen and reorganized it into the present eighty-one chapters (treatises) format. Treatises seventy-two and seventy-three are lost and only the titles are known. Originally his changes were all done in red ink, but later copyists incorporated some of his additions into the main text. However, the 1053 version discussed below restored almost all of his annotations and they are now written in small characters next to the larger characters that comprise the main or unannotated Suwen text. See Unschuld, pages 40 and 44.)

According to Unschuld (pages 39 and 62) Wang Bing's version of the Suwen was based on Quan Yuanqi's (early sixth century) commented version of the Suwen consisting of nine juan (books) and sixty-nine discourses. Wang Bing made corrections, added two "lost" discourses, added seven comprehensive discourses related to the "five periods and six qi" 五運六氣 (wuyun liuqi) doctrine, inserted over 5000 commentaries and reorganized the text into twenty-four juan and eighty-one treatises.

In his preface to his version of the Suwen, Wang Bing goes into great detail listing the changes he made. (See Veith, Appendix II and Unschuld pages 41–43.)

Not much is known about Wang Bing's life but he authored several books. A note in the preface left by the later editors of the Chong Guang Bu Zhu Huangdi Neijing Suwen (version compiled by 1053 editorial committee) which was based on an entry in Tang Ren Wu Zhi (Record on Tang [Dynasty] Personalities) states that he was an official with the rank of tai pu ling and died after a long life of more than eighty years.

== Authoritative version ==
The "authoritative version" used today, Chong Guang Bu Zhu Huangdi Neijing Suwen (重廣補註黃帝內經素問; "Huangdi Neijing Suwen: Again Broadly Corrected [and] Annotated"), is the product of the eleventh-century Imperial Editorial Office (beginning in 1053 CE) and was based considerably on Wang Bing's 762 CE version. Some of the leading scholars who worked on this version of the Suwen were 林億 Lin Yi, 孫奇 Sun Qi, 高保衡 Gao Baoheng and 孫兆 Sun Zhao.

For images of the Chong Guang Bu Zhu Huangdi Neijing Suwen printed in the Ming dynasty, (1368–1644 CE) see the external links section below.

== English translations ==
Sinological translations

- Handbooks for Daoist Practice, translated by Louis Komjathy. Ten volume set of pamphlets, where volume three of the set is Yellow Thearch's Basic Questions. Only the first two discourses out of the total eighty-one are translated.
- Beginning in 2003, the Sinlogists and scholars of Chinese medical history Paul Unschuld, Hermann Tessenow and their team at the Institute for the History of Medicine at LMU Munich published several volumes of translation and scholarly apparatus. the Neijing Suwen, including an analysis of the historical and structural layers of the Suwen.

TCM-style translations

- The Medical Classic of the Yellow Emperor, translated by Zhu Ming, Foreign Language Press, Beijing, China, 2001, 302 pages. ISBN 7-119-02664-X. An edited version of the Neijing with the treatises reordered by topic. About a 20–25 percent of the Neijing (both Suwen and Lingshu) is translated. Includes annotations and commentaries by translator.
- Yellow Empero's [sic] Canon of Internal Medicine (stated to be Wang Bing's version, but a quick examination shows it to appear to be identical to the authoritative version, but without the commentary), translated by Nelson Liansheng Wu and Andrew Qi Wu. China Science & Technology Press, Beijing, China, 1999, 831 pages. ISBN 7-5046-2231-1. Complete translation of both Suwen and Lingshu. Contains the Neijing text in simplified Chinese characters, along with alternate variants of Neijing text also in simplified characters. The alternate variants of the Neijing are not translated, only the main version is translated. None of the commentary by Wang Bing is translated.

Medical history translations

- Huang Di nei jing su wen: Nature, Knowledge, Imagery in an Ancient Chinese Medical Text, Unschuld, Paul U., 2003. University of California Press, Berkeley and Los Angeles, California. ISBN 0-520-23322-0. Analysis and history of the Suwen. Includes significant portions of the Suwen translated into English.
- The Yellow Emperor's Classic of Internal Medicine, translated by Ilza Veith. University of California Press, December, 2002, 288 pages. ISBN 0-520-22936-3. Translation of: (1) Wang Bing's 762 CE preface, (2) the c. 1053 CE Imperial Office's preface, (3) a historical account of the Huangdi Suwen from chapter 103 of the 四庫全書總目提要 (Siku Quanshu Zongmu Tiyao; "Complete Library of the Four Treasuries: General Catalog with Abstracts") and (4) the first thirty-four chapters (treatises) of the Suwen. Includes an extensive introductory study with illustrations. The first published English translation of the Suwen. (Originally copyrighted in 1949.)

== Modern Chinese translations and references ==
- 黄帝內经素问校注语译 (Huangdi Neijing Suwen Jiao Zhu Yu Yi; "Yellow Emperor's Inner Classic: Plain Questions – Critically Compared, Annotated and Translated"), Guo Aichun, 1999, vi, 1296 pages. Tianjin Kexue Jishu Chubanshe (Tianjin Science and Technology Press), Tianjin, China. ISBN 7-5308-2114-8. Contains Neijing Suwen text in simplified characters, variants, annotations (both by present day author, Wang Bing and other sources) and Modern Chinese translation. Contains comprehensive index (220 pages) of Neijing Suwen terms. All Chinese in simplified characters.
- 黃帝內經詞典 (Huangdi Neijing Cidian; "Yellow Emperor's Inner Classic Dictionary"), Guo Aichun (editor-in-chief), 1991, vi, 1296 pages. Tianjin Kexue Jishu Chubanshe (Tianjin Science and Technology Press), Tianjin, China. ISBN 7-5308-0906-7. Dictionary of Neijing terms in simplified Chinese.
- 内經素問 Neijing Suwen (Chong Guang Bu Zhu Huangdi Neijing Suwen version), 王冰 Wang Bing, 林億 Lin Yi, 孫奇 Sun Qi, 高保衡 Gao Boheng, 1965. Series: Sibu Beiyao. Zibu, volumes 409–410. Taibei Shi: Taiwan Zhonghua Shuju Mingguo (Taipei City: Taiwan China Press, Republic of China 54). OCLC control number: 24985568. (Note, this volume is in the zishu (zibu) division of the series. The zibu is one of the four traditional divisions of a Chinese library concerning works related to areas of education, Chinese medicine, agriculture, military strategy, astrology, mathematics and so on.) Contains Suwen, Wang Bing's annotations (in small characters) and annotations by 1053 CE Imperial Editorial Office, also in small characters. The Imperial Editorial Office annotations are proceeded by 新校正 xin jiao zheng (newly compared and corrected). All characters in traditional (complex) form.

== Bibliography ==
- Lu, Gwei-djen and Joseph Needham (1980). Celestial Lancets: A History and Rationale of Acupuncture and Moxa. New York, NY: Routledge/Curzon. ISBN 0-7007-1458-8.
- Siku Quanshu Zongmu Tiyao 四庫全書總目提要 (Complete Library of the Four Treasuries: General Catalog with Abstracts), ed. by Ji Yun 紀昀 (1724–1805), Yong Rong 永瑢 (1744–1790), 1782. Shanghai: Shangwu Yinshuguan 上海: 商務印書館, 1933). OCLC 23301089.
- Sivin, Nathan (1993). "Huang ti nei ching 黃帝內經." In Early Chinese Texts: A Bibliographical Guide, ed. by Michael Loewe. Berkeley and Los Angeles: University of California Press: 196–215.
- Sivin, Nathan (1988). "Science and Medicine in Imperial China—The State of the Field". The Journal of Asian Studies. 47 (1): 41–90. doi:10.2307/2056359. JSTOR 2056359. PMID 11617269. S2CID 26443679. ProQuest 1290553712.
- Sôma, Mitsuru; Kawabata, Kin-aki; Tanikawa, Kiyotaka (25 October 2004). "Units of Time in Ancient China and Japan". Publications of the Astronomical Society of Japan. 56 (5): 887–904. doi:10.1093/pasj/56.5.887.
- Unschuld, Paul U. (2003). Huang Di Nei Jing Su Wen : Nature, Knowledge, Imagery in an Ancient Chinese Medical Text, with an Appendix, the Doctrine of the Five Periods and Six Qi in the Huang Di Nei Jing Su Wen. Berkeley: University of California Press. ISBN 0520233220.
- ———; Tessenow, Hermann (2008). A Dictionary of the Huang Di Nei Jing Su Wen. Berkekely, Calif.: University of California Press. ISBN 978-0520253582.
- ———; Tessenow, Hermann (2011). Huang Di Nei Jing Su Wen : An Annotated Translation of Huang Di's Inner Classic - Basic Questions, Volume II, Chapters 53–71, and 74–81. University of California Press. ISBN 9780520266988.
- Veith, Ilza; translator (1972). The Yellow Emperor's Classic of Internal Medicine). Revised paperback edition. Berkeley, Los Angeles: University of California Press. ISBN 0-520-02158-4.
- Wiseman, Nigel and Andy Ellis (1995). Fundamentals of Chinese Medicine: Zhong Yi Xue Ji Chu. Revised edition. Brookline, Mass.: Paradigm Publications. ISBN 0-912111-44-5.
