= Dawayao station =

Beijing Subway station

Coordinates: 39.8593°N 116.2403°E

Dawayao 大瓦窑
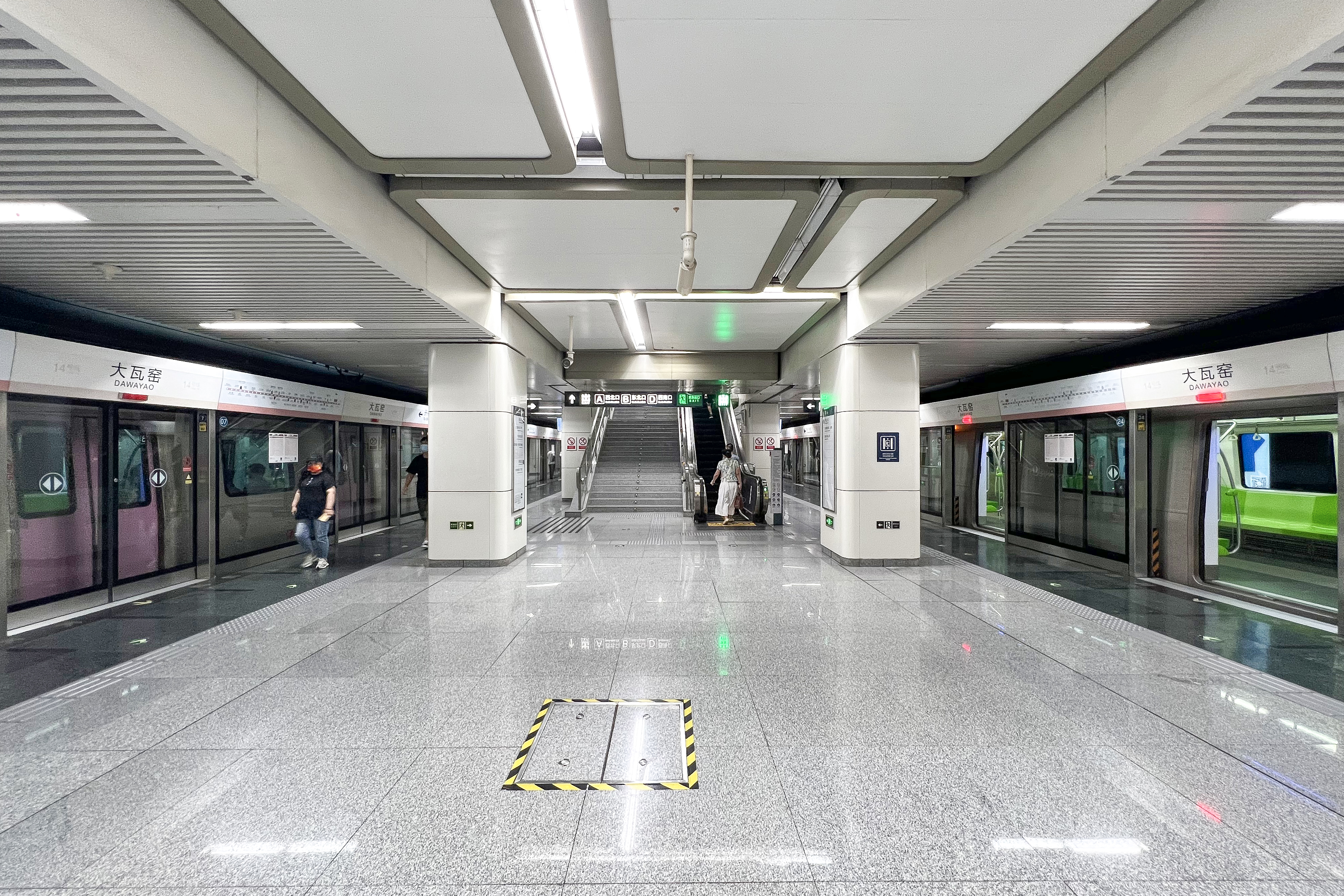
- Platform

General information
- Location: near the intersection of Zhangyicun Road (张仪村路) and Middle Dawayao Road (大瓦窑中路); Lugouqiao Subdistrict, Fengtai District, Beijing; China
- Operator: Beijing MTR Corporation Limited
- Line: Line 14
- Platforms: 2 (1 island platform)
- Tracks: 2

Construction
- Structure type: Underground
- Accessible: Yes

History
- Opened: May 5, 2013

Services
Preceding station	Beijing Subway	Following station
Garden Expo Park towards Zhangguozhuang	Line 14	Guozhuangzi towards Shangezhuang
Location
- Location within Beijing

Dawayao (simplified Chinese: 大瓦窑站; traditional Chinese: 大瓦窯站; pinyin: Dàwǎyáo Zhàn) is a station on Line 14 of the Beijing Subway. This station opened on May 5, 2013.

== Station layout ==
The station has an underground island platform.

== Exits ==
There are 3 exits, lettered A, B, and D. Exit A is accessible.
