= Guozhuangzi station =

Beijing Subway station

Coordinates: 39.8644°N 116.2532°E

Guozhuangzi 郭庄子
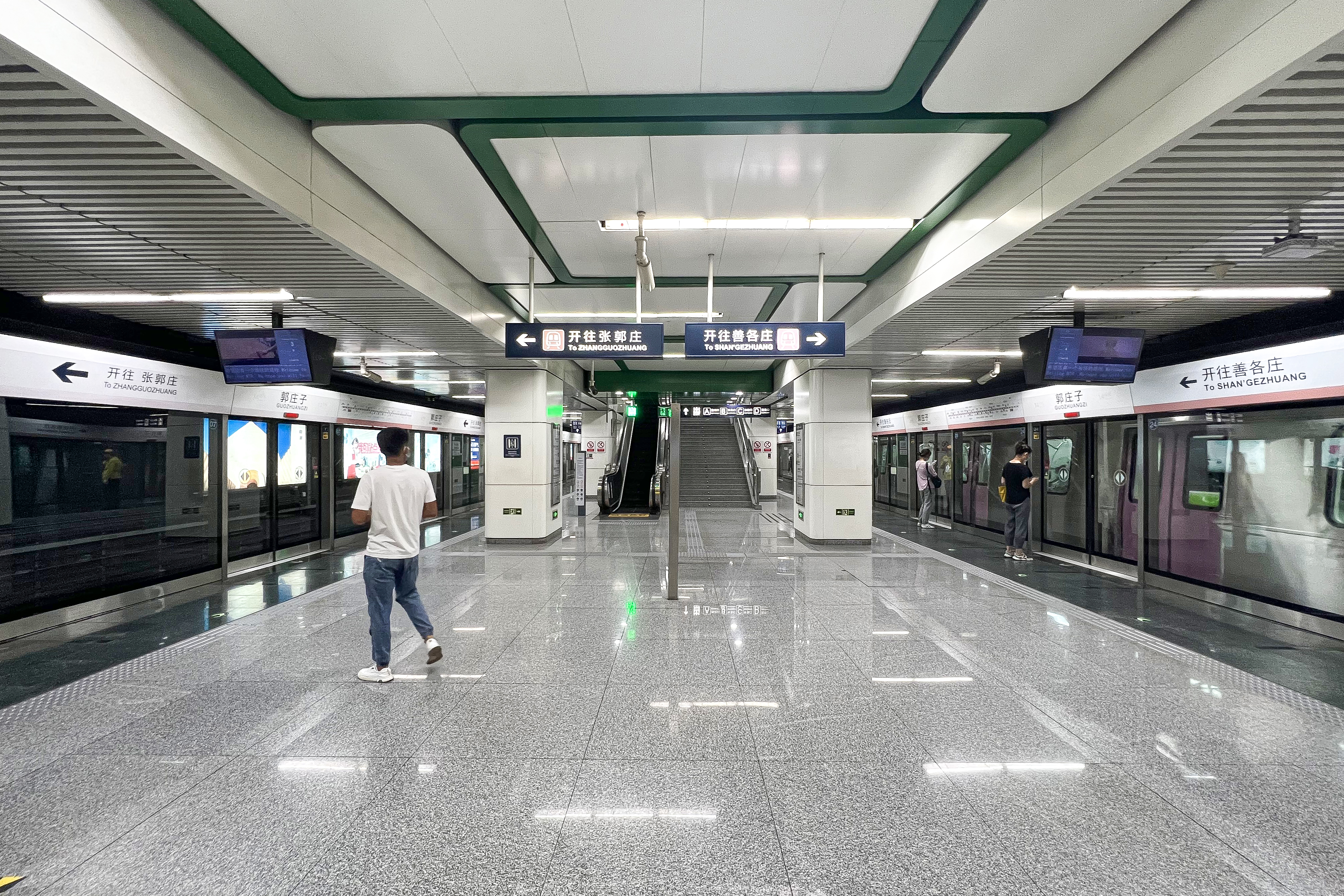
- Platform

General information
- Location: Xiaotun Road (小屯路) at G4 Beijing–Hong Kong and Macau Expressway; Lugouqiao Subdistrict, Fengtai District, Beijing; China
- Operator: Beijing MTR Corporation Limited
- Line: Line 14
- Platforms: 2 (1 island platform)
- Tracks: 2

Construction
- Structure type: Underground
- Accessible: Yes

History
- Opened: May 5, 2013

Services
| Preceding station | Beijing Subway | Following station |
|---|---|---|
| Dawayao towards Zhangguozhuang | Line 14 | Dajing towards Shangezhuang |
Location
- Location within Beijing

Guozhuangzi (simplified Chinese: 郭庄子站; traditional Chinese: 郭莊子站; pinyin: Guōzhuāngzǐ Zhàn) is a station on Line 14 of the Beijing Subway. This station opened on May 5, 2013.

== Station layout ==
The station has an underground island platform.

== Exits ==
There are 4 exits, lettered A, B, C, and D. Exits A and B are accessible.
