= Dajing station =

Beijing Subway station

Dajing 大井
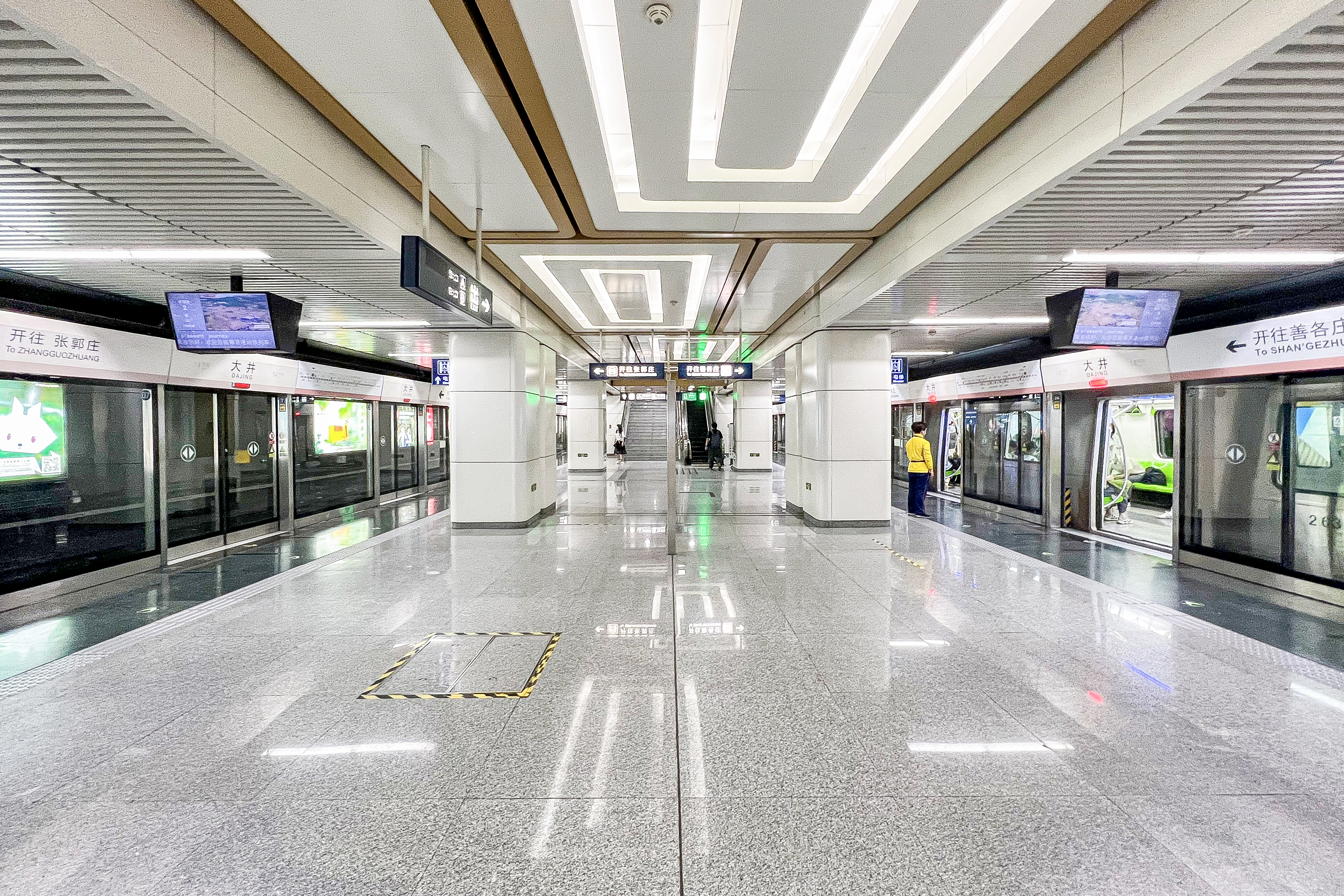
- Platform

General information
- Location: South Fengti Road (丰体南路); Lugouqiao Subdistrict, Fengtai District, Beijing; China
- Coordinates: 39.865226°N 116.276061°E
- Operator: Beijing MTR Corporation Limited
- Line: Line 14
- Platforms: 2 (1 island platform)
- Tracks: 2

Construction
- Structure type: Underground
- Accessible: Yes

History
- Opened: May 5, 2013

Services
Preceding station	Beijing Subway	Following station
Guozhuangzi towards Zhangguozhuang	Line 14	Qilizhuang towards Shangezhuang
Location
- Location within Beijing

Dajing (Chinese: 大井站; pinyin: Dàjǐng Zhàn) is a station on Line 14 of the Beijing Subway. This station opened on May 5, 2013.

== Station layout ==
The station has an underground island platform.

== Exits ==
Dajing Station currently has 2 exits, lettered "A" and "B", both of which are on the north side of Fengti South Road. Exit A is accessible by elevator.

== Gallery ==
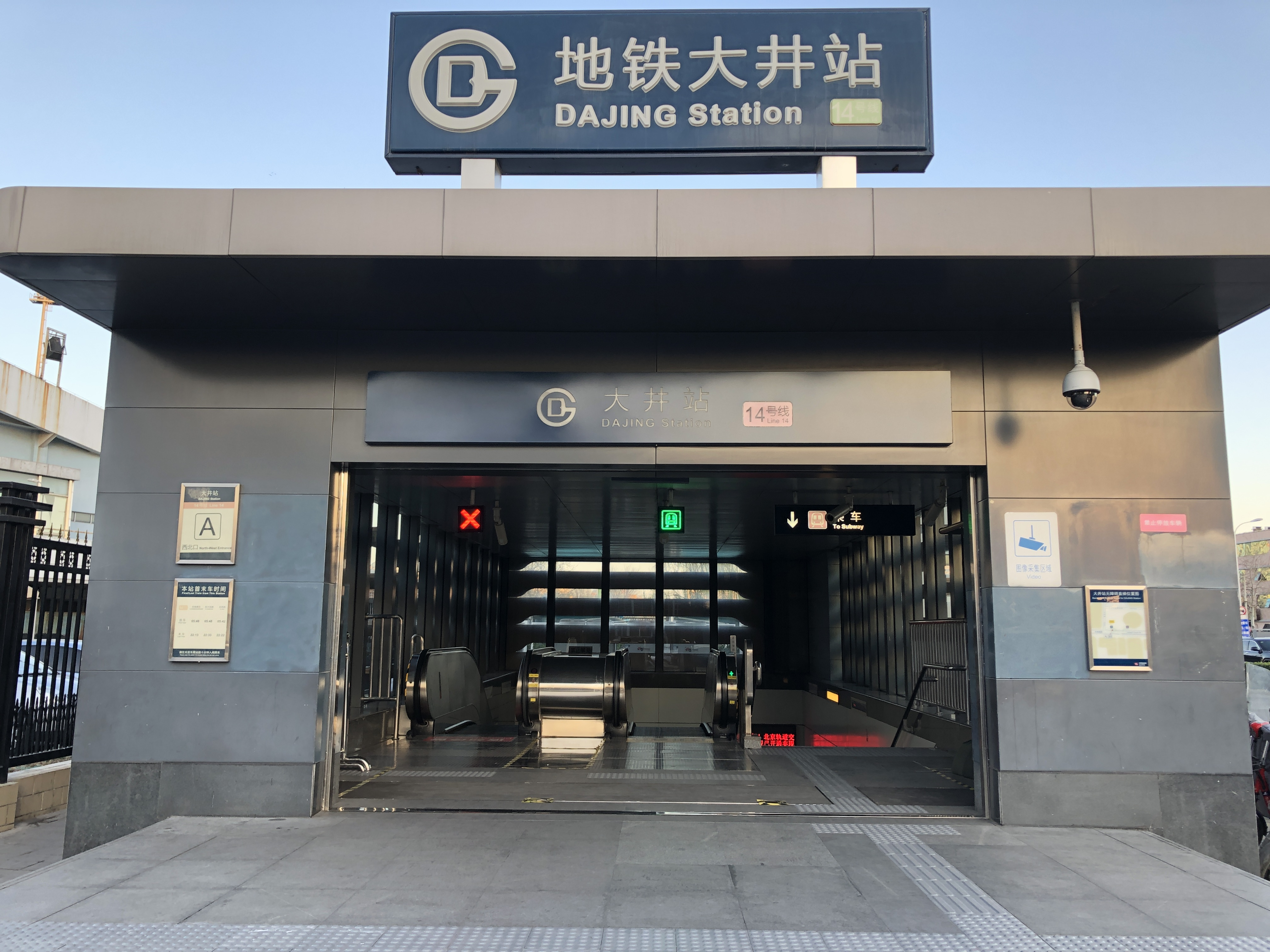
Exit A

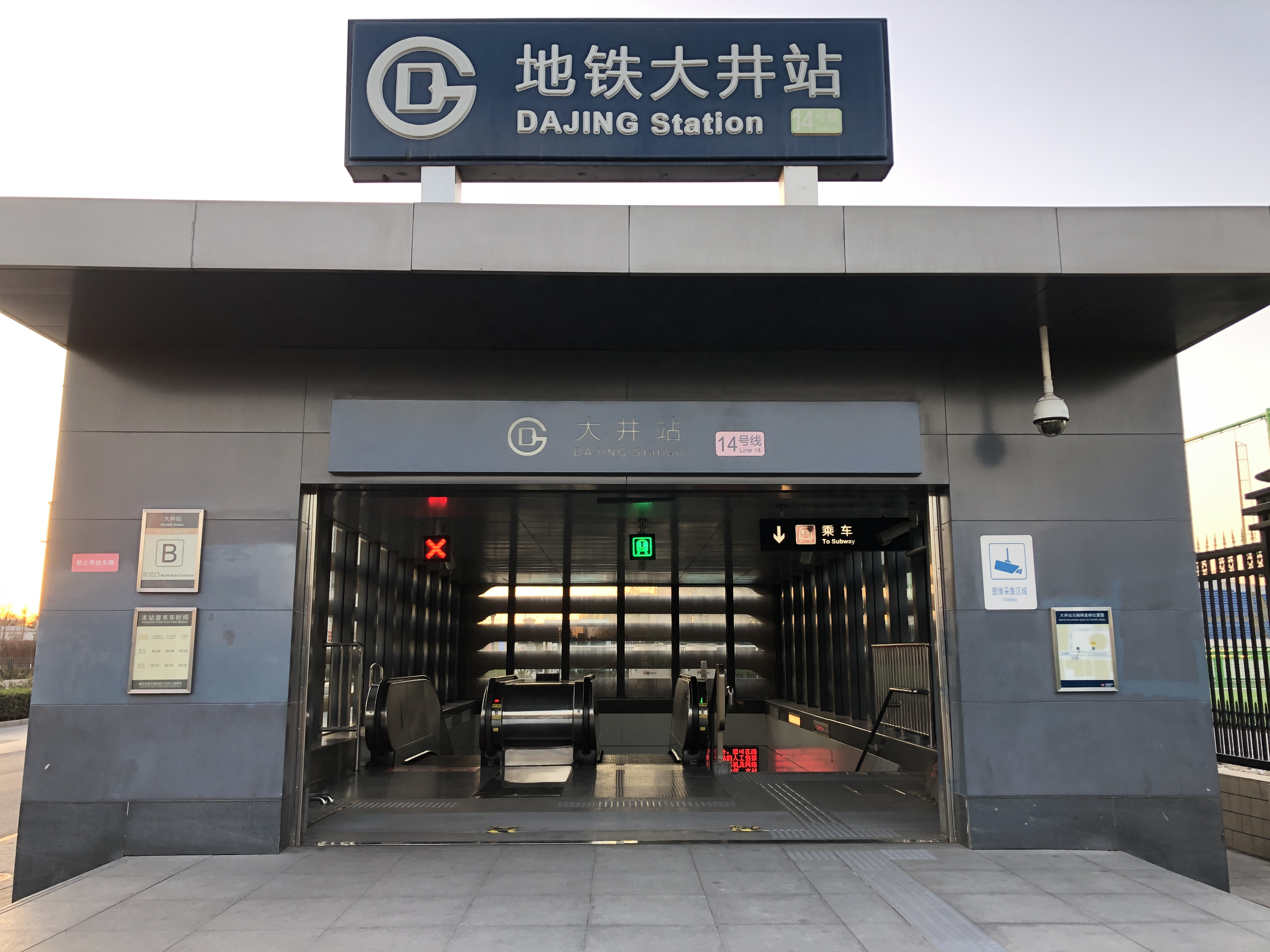
Exit B

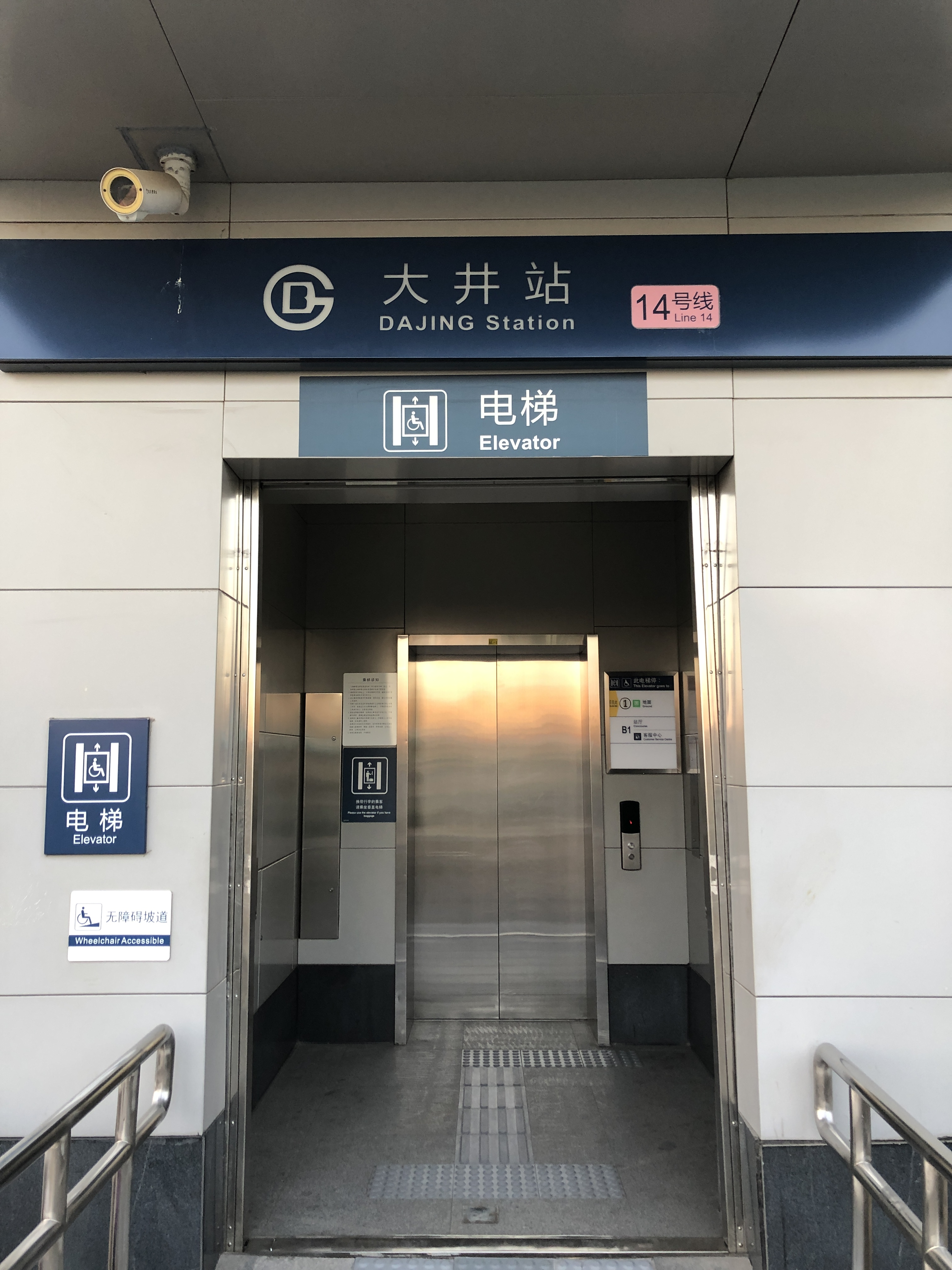
Elevator serving Exit A

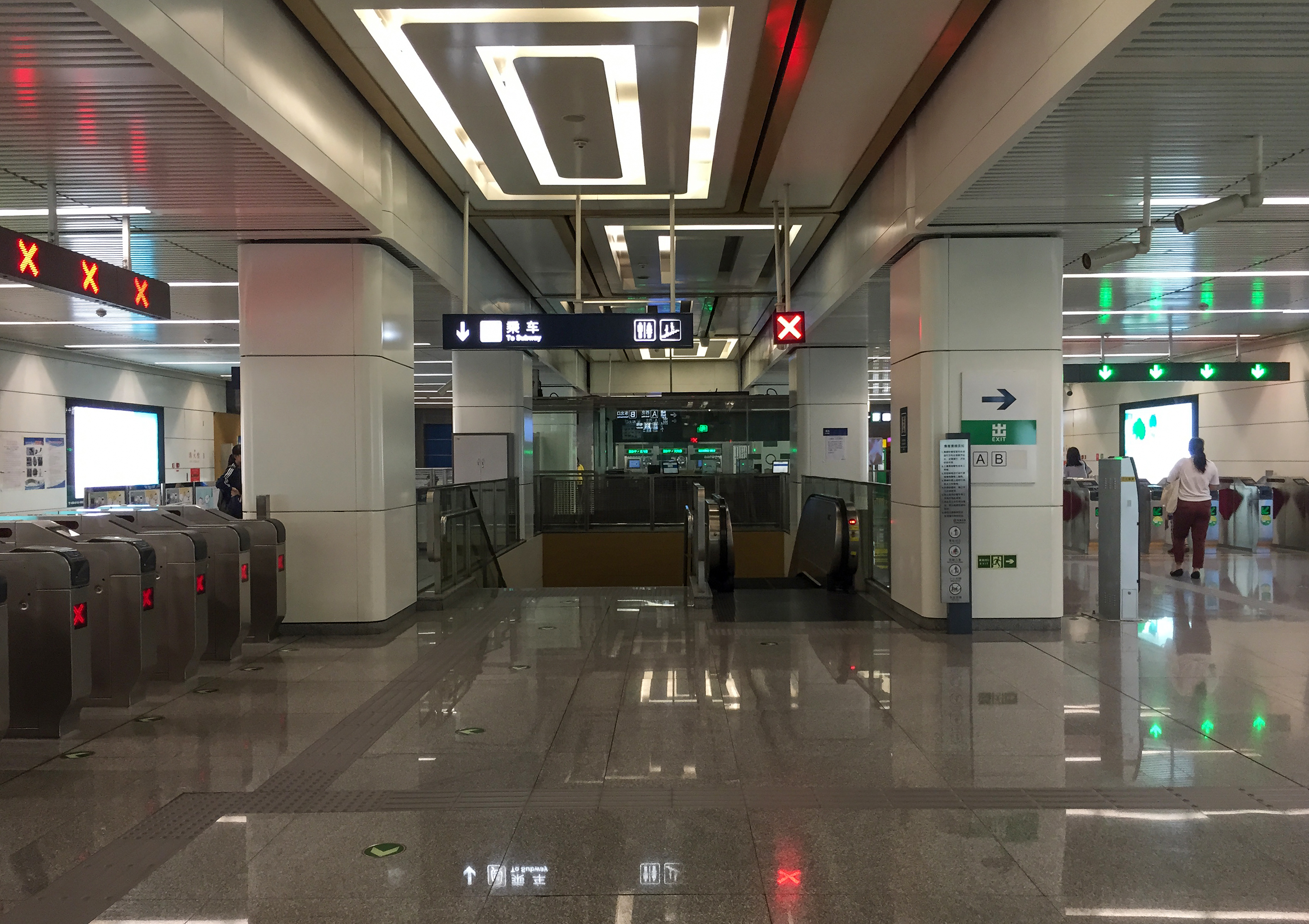
Station Concourse

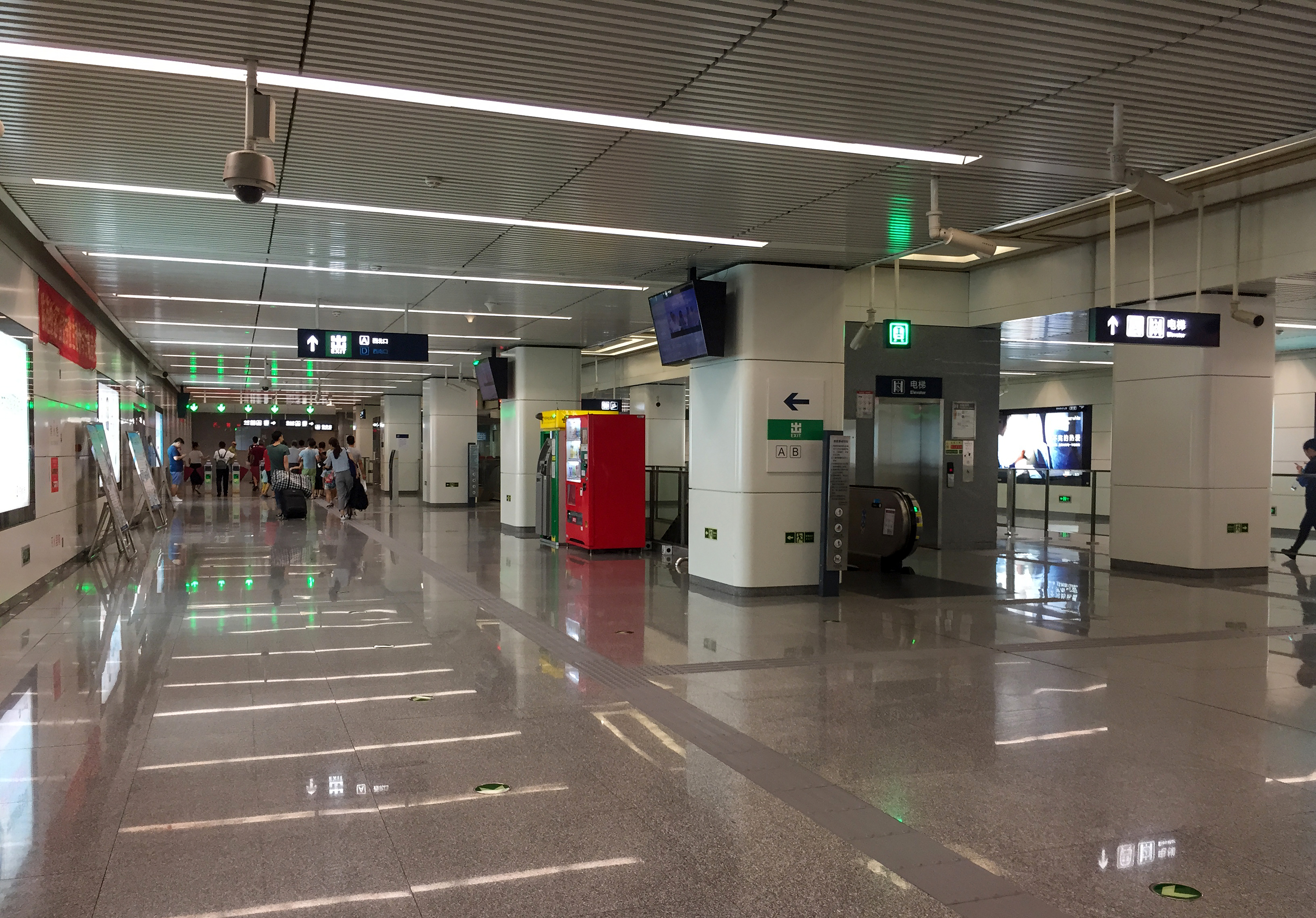
Station Concourse

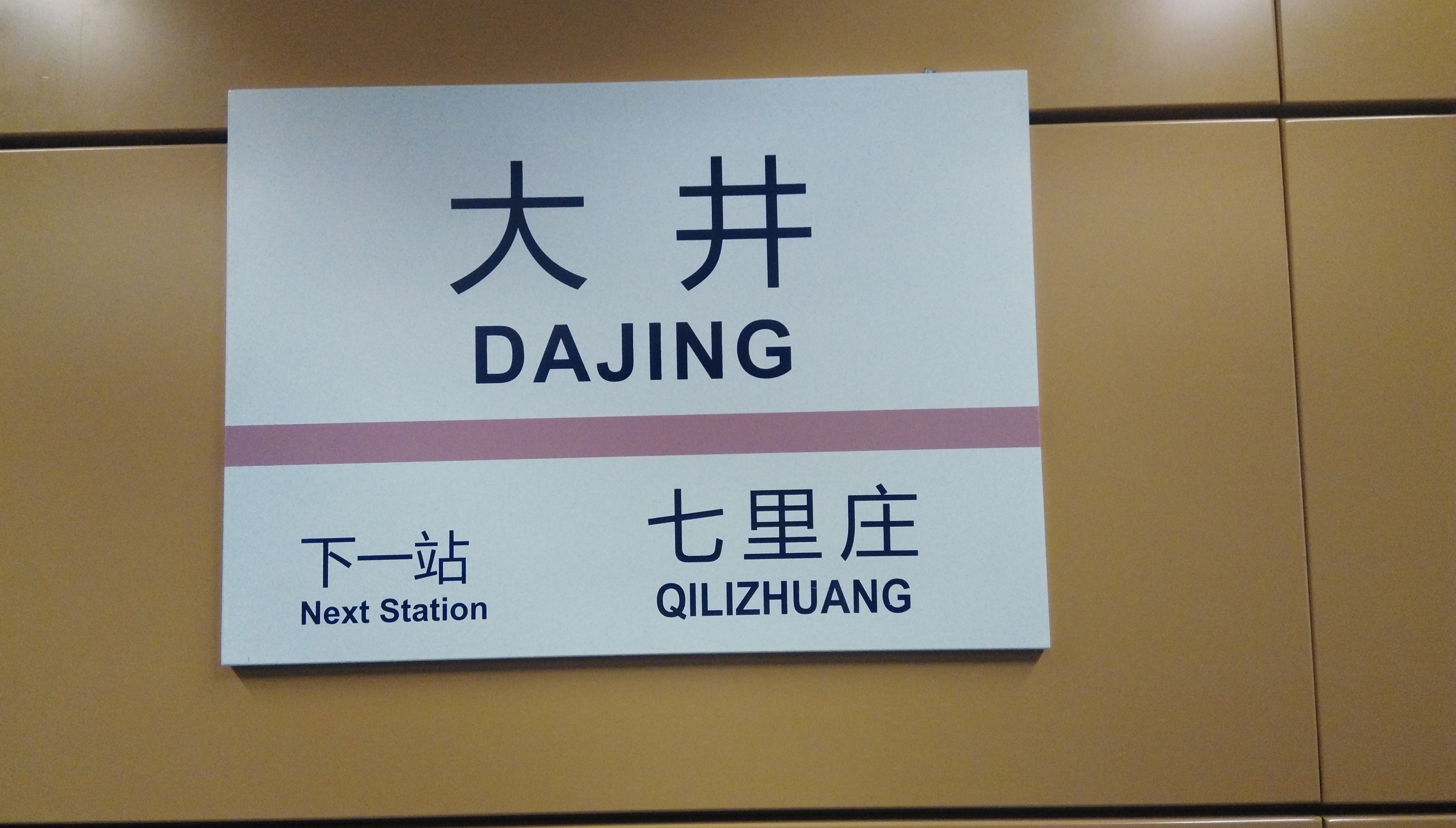
Station Sign

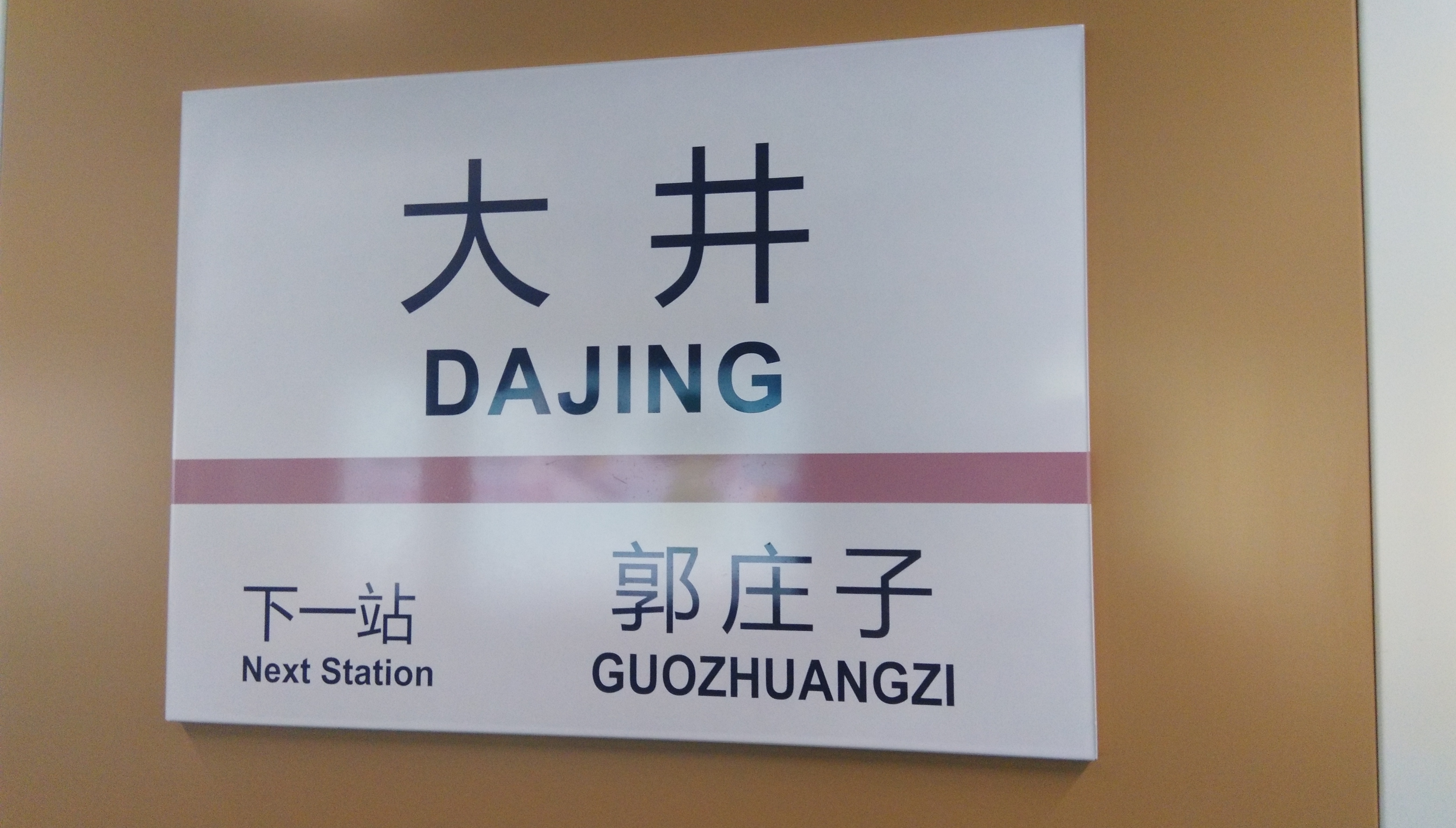
Station Sign

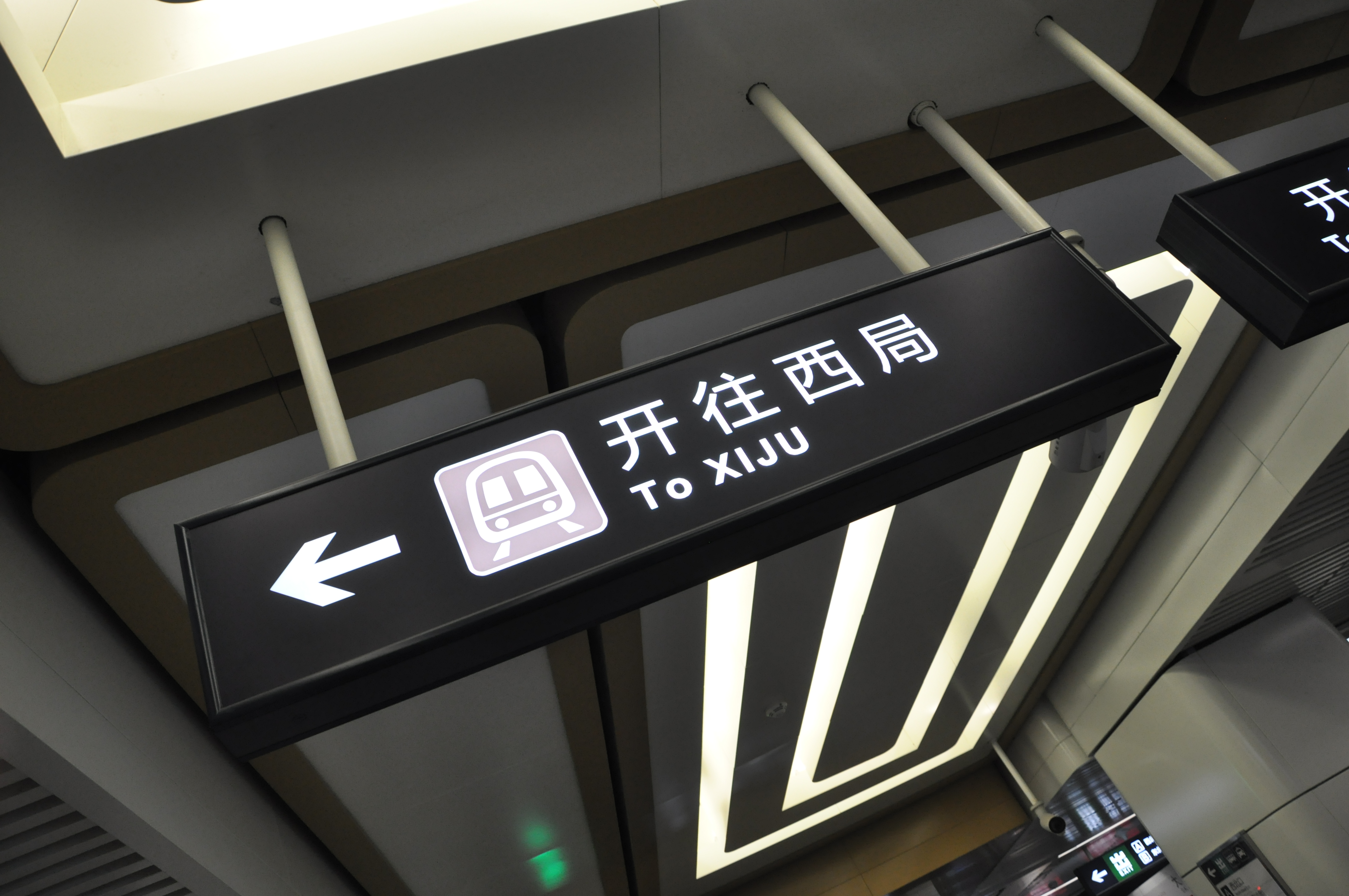
Directional Sign

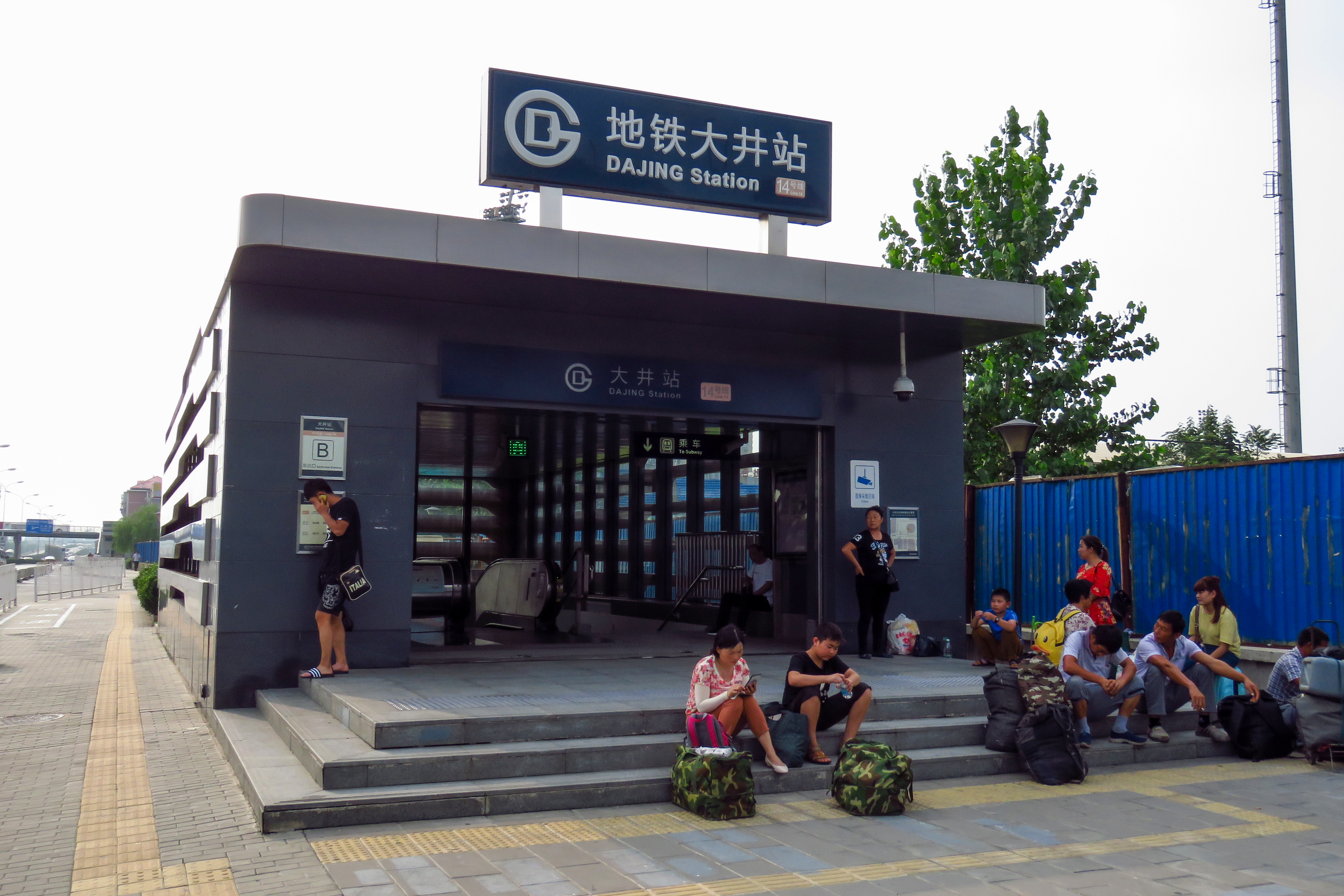
Exit "B"
