= Qin Shi Huang (disambiguation) =

Qin Shi Huang (Chinese: 秦始皇; 259 BC – 210 BC) was the founder and first emperor of the Qin dynasty.

Qin Shi Huang may also refer to:

- Rise of the Great Wall (Chinese title: 秦始皇), a 1985 Hong Kong TV series
- Qin Shi Huang (2001 TV series), a 2001 Chinese TV series
