= Rise of the Great Wall =

1986 Hong Kong TV series

- VCD cover art
- 秦始皇
- Genre: Historical drama
- Written by: Cheung Kwok-yuen; Yu Hon-wing; Leung Chi-ming; Leung Kim-ho
- Directed by: Au Ham-wan; Chow Wah-yu; Fok Chi-kai; Chan Toi-yuen; Tam Sun-yuen; Lee Ngoi-king
- Starring: Tony Liu; Petrina Fung; Michelle Yim; Damian Lau
- Theme music composer: Kwan Sing-yau
- Opening theme: "The Land Under My Feet" (大地在我腳下) by Gallen Lo
- Country of origin: Hong Kong
- Original language: Cantonese
- No. of episodes: 63

Production
- Producers: Ting Leung; Lee Siu-wah
- Production location: Hong Kong
- Editor: Leung Kim-ho
- Running time: ≈45 minutes per episode
- Production company: ATV

Original release
- Network: ATV
- Release: 1986 – 1986

Rise of the Great Wall (秦始皇) is a 1986 Hong Kong historical television series based on the life of Ying Zheng (Qin Shi Huang), the First Emperor of China and founder of the Qin dynasty. Starring Tony Liu as Ying Zheng, the series is one of the biggest productions by ATV.

== Synopsis ==
The series follows the life of Ying Zheng, the ruler of the Qin state of the Warring States period. He eventually conquers the six major states, establishes the Qin dynasty, and became the First Emperor of a unified China. The series also includes a subplot about Jing Ke, an assassin who attempts to kill Ying Zheng.

== Cast ==
- Tony Liu as Ying Zheng (Qin Shi Huang)
- Wong Wai as Lü Buwei
- Paw Hee-ching as Lady Zhao
- Hung Tak-sing as Lao Ai
- Sum-sum as Empress Li
- Pau Hon-lam as Wang Wan
- Szema Wah Lung as Wang Jian
- Kwan Wai-lun as Meng Tian
- Leung Hon-wai as Li Si
- Kong To as Wei Liao
- Fung Zan as Lady Huayang
- Lo Chun-shun as King Zhuangxiang of Qin
- Cho Tat-wah as King Zhaoxiang of Qin
- Lam Kwok-hung as Fusu
- Chow Wai-kuen as Lady Hu
- Siao San-yan as Zhao Gao
- Chan Zik-wai as Xiahou Ju
- Pat Poon as Crown Prince Dan of Yan
- Damian Lau as Jing Ke
- Bowie Wu as King Xi of Yan
- Michelle Yim as Xueying
- Ng Kong as Qin Wuyang
- Kong Hon as Gai Nie
- Ting Leung as Lord Pingyuan
- Kenneth Ha as King Xiaocheng of Zhao
- Cheung Yick as Li Mu
- Ng Wing-sam as Guo Kai
- Petrina Fung as Lady Meng Jiang
- Wong Jo-see as Princess Mingyi
- Betty Mak as Princess Han Mi
- Cheng Gwan-min as a grandfather
- Cheng Lui
- Lai Suen

== Production ==
Rise of the Great Wall set a new standard for ATV because most of its prior television series were not as good as those produced by its rival, TVB.

== See also ==
- Qin Shi Huang (2001 TV series)
- The Emperor's Shadow
- The Emperor and the Assassin
- Hero (2002 film)
