= The First Emperor =

2006 opera by Tan Dun

- Opera by Tan Dun
- Official DVD cover from the Met premiere production
- Librettist: Ha Jin and Tan Dun
- Language: English
- Based on: Records of the Grand Historian by Sima Qian; and the screenplay The Emperor's Shadow by Lu Wei
- Premiere: 21 December 2006; Metropolitan Opera House, New York City

The First Emperor is an English‑language opera in two acts with music by Tan Dun, with a libretto by Tan Dun and novelist Ha Jin. The story, which centers on Qin Shi Huang and the forging of a unifying anthem for a newly consolidated empire, draws on Sima Qian's Records of the Grand Historian and the screenplay The Emperor's Shadow by Lu Wei.

The world premiere took place at the Metropolitan Opera on 21 December 2006, conducted by the composer, with Plácido Domingo in the title role. The staging was by filmmaker Zhang Yimou, with sets by Fan Yue and costumes by Emi Wada. The production was a Met–Los Angeles Opera co‑production. The opera was transmitted live to cinemas as part of the first season of Metropolitan Opera Live in HD on 13 January 2007 and later issued on DVD.

Critical reaction at the premiere was mixed. Reviewers praised the scale of the staging and performances, while questioning aspects of the score and dramaturgy.

== Background ==
The protagonist is the real-life emperor Qin Shi Huang, who unified China with force, erected part of the Great Wall, and was buried with his Terracotta Army. The story of the opera is based on the Records of the Grand Historian by Sima Qian (c.145 – 90 BC) and the screenplay of The Emperor's Shadow by Lu Wei.

Tan Dun was first approached by the Met in 1996 to write an opera. After seeing the film The Emperor's Shadow, he settled on the theme of the First Emperor. Zhang Yimou, the production's stage director, had worked with Tan Dun on the movie Hero that also deals with emperor Qin, albeit at an earlier time. The world premiere production was estimated to cost in excess of US$2 million. In preparation, Met staff was instructed in Chinese, and workshops in the development of the opera were held in Shanghai, in part as a cost-saving measure. Eagerly anticipated, the opera has been described as "a high-stakes, cross-cultural gamble". Tan Dun noted in regard to working in the operatic form: "Opera will no longer be a Western form, as it is no longer an Italian form."

== Roles ==
Roles, voice types, premiere casts
Role	Voice type	Premiere cast, 21 December 2006 Conductor: Tan Dun	European premiere cast, 6 September 2008, Theater Saarbrücken Der erste Kaiser Conductor: Constantin Trinks
Emperor Qin	tenor	Plácido Domingo	Jevgenij Taruntsov
Princess Yueyang, Emperor Qin's daughter	soprano	Elizabeth Futral	Alexandra Lubchansky
Gao Jianli, musician	lyric tenor	Paul Groves	Dong Won Kim
General Wang Bi	bass	Hao Jiang Tian	Hiroshi Matsui
Shaman	mezzo-soprano	Michelle DeYoung	Yanyu Guo
Chief Minister	baritone	Haijing Fu	Olafur Sigurdarson
Yin-Yang Master, official geomancer	Peking opera singer	Wu Hsing-kuo	Xiquan Jin
Mother of Yueyang	mezzo-soprano	Susanne Mentzer	Maria Pawlus
Soldiers, guards, slaves, etc

== Synopsis ==
=== Act 1 ===
Scene 1

The traditional music at the court displeases the Emperor; he envisions a new anthem that glorifies his rule. He believes that his childhood friend, the composer Gao Jianli, should be the person to compose the anthem. Jianli lives in Yan, a state that the emperor has not yet conquered, and he orders his General to subjugate Yan and to get Jianli. As a reward for a victory, the Emperor promises his crippled daughter, Princess Yueyang, to the General.

Scene 2

The General is successful, and Jianli is brought before the Emperor. Although the Emperor greets Jianli with friendship, Jianli is enraged and rejects him: his village was destroyed, and his mother was killed. He would rather die than compose an anthem for the emperor. Princess Yueyang admires his bravery.

Scene 3

The Princess convinces the Emperor to hand Jianli over to her if she is able to convince him to live on and write the anthem. Jianli refuses to eat, but when the Princess feeds him from her own mouth, his resistance is broken. They make love and she loses her virginity. The Princess cries he is hurting her legs and she realises she is no longer paralysed and can walk normally. The Emperor, who is overjoyed to see her cured and calls Jianli a miracle worker, soon recognizes the cause. He wants to kill Jianli for violating his daughter, but hesitates at this point to get his anthem.

=== Act 2 ===
Scene 1

As Jianli instructs Princess Yueyang in music, he hears the slaves sing while they build the Great Wall. The Emperor appears and demands that his daughter honor his promise of marriage to General Wang Bi. Yueyang refuses; she would rather kill herself. The Emperor schemes asking Jianli to give her up temporarily. He expects the General to be killed in battle, and Jianli would be free afterwards to have his daughter. Jianli agrees and will complete the anthem.

Scene 2

At the imperial inauguration the Emperor encounters the ghost of Yueyang: she had committed suicide as she could not sacrifice her love for the benefit of the country. Next he meets the ghost of General Wang Bi telling him that he was poisoned by Jianli and warning him of Jianli's vengeance. As the Emperor ascends towards his throne, Jianli emerges. Insane with grief about his lover's death, he bites off his tongue and spits it out at the Emperor. The Emperor strikes him down to spare him a slow death. He moves on to his throne and now hears the anthem for the first time. It is the slaves' song. He realizes that this is Jianli's revenge.

== Instrumentation ==
- Woodwinds: 2 flutes (one doubling on an amplified bass flute), 2 oboes, 2 clarinets, 2 bassoons
- Brass: 3 horns, 3 trumpets, C trumpet, 2 trombones, tuba
- Percussion (4 percussionist + timpanist): timpani, Tibetan singing bowl
- 2 harps, strings, ancient music instruments (minimum 7 players): large Chinese drums, pairs of stones, 15-string zheng (Chinese lute or Japanese koto), pitched ceramic chimes (pitched ceramic flower pots), waterphones, giant bell onstage

== Recording ==
Year	Cast (Emperor Qin, Princess Yueyang, Jianli, General, Shaman)	Conductor, Opera house and orchestra	Label
2007	Plácido Domingo, Elizabeth Futral, Paul Groves, Hao Jiang Tian, Michelle DeYoung	Tan Dun, Metropolitan Opera orchestra and chorus	DVD: EMI Classics; Cat:5 09921 512995 (The Met HD Live Series)

Note: "Cat:" is short for catalogue number by the label company.

== Reception ==
Initial critical response was mixed. Alex Ross of The New Yorker characterized the score as ambitious yet uneven, despite striking moments and a lavish staging by Zhang Yimou. James Fenton wrote in The Guardian that the production impresses visually, while questioning the effectiveness of the music and text.
