= Assassinator Jing Ke =

2004 Chinese TV series

- VCD box art
- Also known as: Assassinator Jing Ke: The Revenge
- 荆轲传奇
- Genre: Wuxia; Historical drama
- Screenplay by: Yu Zheng
- Directed by: Raymond Lee
- Presented by: Yang Buting; Ma Runsheng; Wang Songshan; Li Bolun
- Starring: Liu Ye; Peter Ho; Zheng Jiayu; Zhang Tielin; Shao Bing; Zhai Ying
- Opening theme: "Song of the Great Wind" (大风歌)
- Ending theme: "Beauty" (红颜) by Anson Hu
- Country of origin: China
- Original language: Mandarin
- No. of episodes: 32

Production
- Producer: Han Sanping
- Production location: China
- Running time: ≈45 minutes per episode
- Production companies: Beijing Hualubaina Film & TV

Assassinator Jing Ke (荆轲传奇) is a 2004 Chinese wuxia television series romanticising the life of Jing Ke, who attempted to assassinate Ying Zheng, the King of Qin, in 227 BC. Directed by Raymond Lee, the series starred Liu Ye as the titular character, with Peter Ho, Zheng Jiayu, Zhang Tielin, Shao Bing, and Zhai Ying as part of the supporting cast.

== Synopsis ==
The series is set in third-century BC China during the Warring States period. In 260 BC, after Qin defeats Zhao at the Battle of Changping, some Zhao refugees flee their homeland and settle in an isolated valley. Two young men, Jing Ke and Fan Wuji, grow up with their common romantic interest, Ye Xiaohu.

Fan Wuji eventually leaves for Qin, where he becomes a subordinate of the infamous Qin general Bai Qi. In the meantime, Jing Ke and Ye Xiaohu wander to Qi, where Ye Xiaohu abandons Jing Ke and ends up marrying an abusive wealthy man. She plots with Nie Wuya, her husband's scheming henchman, to kill her husband and seize his fortune.

Framed for the murder, Jing Ke is arrested and sentenced to death. However, he is saved by Tian Guang, who recommends him to join an assassin clan. He learns swordsmanship from a powerful master and completes many missions for the clan. Over time, he realises that an assassin's life is not for him, especially after he loses Yunxi, a woman he meets and falls in love with on one mission.

During this time, Jing Ke also becomes close friends with the musician Gao Jianli. Meanwhile, Fan Wuji rises through the ranks in the Qin army and gains the favour of Ying Zheng, the ruthless king of Qin, but unknowingly incurs the jealousy of the Qin chancellor Lü Buwei.

Jing Ke's adventures lead him to Yan, where he meets Crown Prince Dan, who implores him to kill Ying Zheng in order to save the other states from being conquered by Qin. Dan had previously been held hostage in Qin, but had escaped with Fan Wuji's help. Jing Ke eventually accepts the mission to assassinate Ying Zheng, while Fan Wuji aids him by committing suicide since Ying Zheng has placed a bounty on Fan Wuji's head for treason.

Jing Ke embarks on his quest, taking along with him Fan Wuji's head and a map with a dagger concealed inside. His attempt on Ying Zheng's life, though unsuccessful, will be remembered in Chinese history.

== Cast ==
- Liu Ye as Jing Ke
- Peter Ho as Gao Jianli
- Wang Ya'nan as Fan Wuji
- Shao Bing as Ying Zheng, the King of Qin
- Zhang Tielin as Lü Buwei
- Zhai Ying as Yunxi
- Zheng Jiayu as Ye Xiaohu
- Elvis Tsui as Bai Qi
- Li Qian as Princess Wanlan
- Huang Jue as General Hao Yue
- Wu Jun as Nie Wuya
- Feng Shaofeng as Crown Prince Dan of Yan
- Han Xiao as Meng Yan
- Liu Weihua as Tian Guang
- Jin Shugui as King Xi of Yan
- Liu Liwei as Lady Xu

== See also ==
- The Emperor and the Assassin
