= The Emperor and the Assassin =

- DVD release cover

Chinese name
- Traditional Chinese: 荊軻刺秦王
- Simplified Chinese: 荆轲刺秦王
Transcriptions
Standard Mandarin
- Hanyu Pinyin: Jīng Kē Cì Qín Wáng
- Directed by: Chen Kaige
- Written by: Chen Kaige; Wang Peigong
- Produced by: Han Sanping; Chen Kaige; Tsuguhiko Kadokawa; Hiromitsu Furukawa
- Starring: Gong Li; Zhang Fengyi; Zhou Xun; Li Xuejian; Chen Kaige
- Cinematography: Zhao Fei; Zheng Hua; Shang Yong
- Edited by: Zhou Xinxia
- Music by: Zhao Jiping
- Production companies: Shin Corporation; Le Studio Canal+; New Wave Co.; Beijing Film Studio
- Distributed by: Sony Pictures Classics; Columbia TriStar Home Video
- Release date: 8 October 1998
- Running time: 162 minutes
- Country: China
- Language: Mandarin
- Budget: US$20 million

The Emperor and the Assassin (Chinese: 荊軻刺秦王; pinyin: Jīngkē cì qínwáng; lit. 'Jing Ke Assassinates the King of Qin'), also known as The First Emperor, is a 1998–1999 Chinese historical romance film based primarily on Jing Ke's assassination attempt on the King of Qin, as described in Sima Qian's Records of the Grand Historian. The film was directed by Chen Kaige and stars Gong Li, Zhang Fengyi, Li Xuejian, and Zhou Xun. The film was well received critically and won the Technical Prize at the 1999 Cannes Film Festival. It was the most expensive Chinese film made up to that time, costing US$20 million.

== Plot ==
The film covers much of Ying Zheng's career, recalling his early experiences as a hostage and foreshadowing his dominance over China. He is essentially depicted as an idealist seeking to impose a peace or unity on the world. However, his experiencing of various betrayals and losses slowly turn him into a mad tyrant. The story consists of three main incidents: the attempt by Jing Ke to assassinate Ying Zheng in 227 BCE; the (fictitious) rumour of Chief Minister Lü Buwei's having sired Ying Zheng on his concubine before transferring her to become the Queen Dowager; and the story of an official having sired children by the Queen Dowager herself. The first incident is the climax of the film, with earlier scenes foreshadowing it; the other two incidents occur between the fictional genesis and historical manifestation of the first.

In the film, Ying Zheng sends his concubine Lady Zhao to the Yan state as a spy to enlist a Yan assassin to attempt to assassinate him, intending to use that as a casus belli to start a war against Yan. Lady Zhao persuades Jing Ke to perform the assassination. After learning of Ying Zheng's massacre of the children in her home state of Zhao, Lady Zhao desires the assassination in earnest. The attempt fails, but Ying Zheng expresses his fury when his associates make no attempt to stop the assassin and he is forced to kill Jing Ke himself. He is further saddened when Lady Zhao returns to Qin only to retrieve Jing Ke for burial.

== Cast ==
- Gong Li as Lady Zhao
- Zhang Fengyi as Jing Ke
- Li Xuejian as Ying Zheng
- Gu Yongfei as Queen Dowager
- Wang Zhiwen as Lao Ai
- Lü Xiaohe as Fan Yuqi
- Sun Zhou as Crown Prince Dan of Yan
- Chen Kaige as Lü Buwei
- Pan Changjiang as prison official
- Zhou Xun as blind girl
- Cong Zhijun as old official
- Li Longyin as shop owner
- Li Qiang as Han messenger
- Zhao Benshan as Gao Jianli
- Ding Haifeng as Qin Wuyang
- Hu Yang as young official
- Zhang Shen as dwarf
- Li Hongtao as Li Si
- Wei Chao as Doujiyan
- Han Dong as Qin cart driver
- Li Zhonglin as Qin prison guard
- Liu Tielian as palace ritual eunuch
- Kong Qinsan as face tattooist
- Xie Zengran as younger Wang brother
- Chang Tao as older Wang brother
- Zhang Jinzhan as Yan ambassador
- Zhao Yanguo as artist
- Lin Luyue as warrior
- Liu Jiacheng as warrior
- Chu Xu as warrior
- Liu Bo as warrior
- Liu Liang as warrior

== Reception ==
On the review aggregator website Rotten Tomatoes, 81% of 36 critics' reviews are positive, with an average rating of 7.3/10. Metacritic, which uses a weighted average, assigned the film a score of 75 out of 100, based on 25 critics, indicating "generally favorable" reviews.

== Awards ==
The Emperor and the Assassin won the Technical Grand Prize at the 1999 Cannes Film Festival and was in competition for the Palme d'Or. Zhao Fei was awarded the 1999 Golden Rooster Award for Best Cinematography.

== Background ==
Chen Kaige noted upon the film's premiere at the Cannes Film Festival that he hoped The Emperor and the Assassin would hold relevance to the events of the time, notably the Yugoslav Wars.

== See also ==
- List of historical drama films of Asia
- The Emperor's Shadow
- Hero (2002 film)
- Rise of the Great Wall
- Qin Shi Huang (2001 TV series)
- Assassinator Jing Ke
