= The Emperor's Shadow =

- Film poster
- Traditional Chinese: 秦頌
- Simplified Chinese: 秦颂
- Hanyu Pinyin: Qín Sòng
- Directed by: Zhou Xiaowen
- Written by: Lu Wei
- Produced by: Chen Zhitao
- Starring: Jiang Wen; Ge You; Xu Qing; Ge Zhijun
- Cinematography: Lü Gengxin
- Edited by: Zhong Furong
- Music by: Zhao Jiping
- Production companies: Xi'an Film Studio; Ocean Film Co., Ltd.
- Distributed by: Fox Lorber (U.S.)
- Release date: 31 October 1996 (Hong Kong)
- Running time: 116 minutes
- Country: China
- Language: Mandarin

The Emperor's Shadow is a 1996 Chinese historical drama film directed by Zhou Xiaowen and starring Jiang Wen, Ge You, Xu Qing and Ge Zhijun. It was the most expensive Chinese film ever produced at the time of its release.

== Plot ==
Set in third century BC China, the story of The Emperor's Shadow revolves around the relationship between Ying Zheng, the King of Qin, and later the First Emperor; and the musician Gao Jianli. Gao Jianli's mother was the king's wet nurse when the young king was a hostage in the Zhao state, but they were separated after the former returns to Qin to become king.

After reaching adulthood, Ying Zheng embarks on a series of wars to fulfill his plan of unifying China. He kidnaps Gao Jianli from the Yan state to compose a powerful anthem for his new state. The two conflict over the new composition, the construction of grand public works, Ying Zheng's ruthless mass killing policies, and Ying Zheng's daughter, Princess Yueyang.

== Cast ==
- Jiang Wen as Ying Zheng
  - Tian Ming as young Ying Zheng
- Ge You as Gao Jianli
  - Wang Peng as young Gao Jianli
- Xu Qing as Princess Yueyang
- Ge Zhijun as Zhao Gao
- Wang Qingxiang as Li Si
- Di Guoqiang as Wang Jian
- Wang Ning as Wang Ben
- Shu Yaoxuan as Xu Fu
- Li Mengnan as Jing Ke
- Yuan Yuan as Fan Yuqi
- Ren He as Huhai
- Zhao Yi
- Wang Hong
- Sun Bicheng
- Zhang Chunyuan

== Music and themes ==
The political use of music and of the arts in general is one of the major themes in the film. In one of the climaxes of the film, the king states his belief that through music he can "control the minds and hearts of the people", echoing Mao Zedong's Yan'an talks of 1942. Music is perceived by the monarch as being as important as military power. Whereas his armies can conquer his rivals, he needs the arts to exert spiritual and ideological control. At the premiere of the film on 7 June 1996 in Beijing, director Zhou Xiaowen noted: "Chinese rulers have always wanted to control our spirit. But they cannot succeed in doing so."

== Reception ==
After The Emperor's Shadow was released in five major Chinese cities, it was banned by state authorities without any clear reason being given. Eight months later permission was given for re-release.

The film has been criticized in China for its many historical inaccuracies. Chief among these is the distortion of the character of Gao Jianli. According to Sima Qian's Records of the Grand Historian, Gao Jianli was a friend of the assassin Jing Ke, who fails in an attempt upon Ying Zheng's life. Other minor errors, mostly of academic interest, also contribute to the film's lack of historical authenticity. The director Zhou Xiaowen defended his film by saying that it was an exploration of ideas and values for the present day and was not intended as a strictly historical depiction of the First Emperor. In a 1999 interview, he said "I don't like history; I just like the buildings, the palaces, the dress."

The film influenced the creation of Tan Dun's 2006 opera The First Emperor.

In a 1997 review by Joan Lau of the Malaysian newspaper New Straits Times, she wrote that "As for you, never mind if you don't know Seamus Heaney from Enid Blyton, go catch Emperor's Shadow, you won't regret it". On the review aggregator website Rotten Tomatoes, 80% of 5 critics' reviews are positive, with an average rating of 6.9/10.

== See also ==
- List of historical drama films of Asia
- Hero
- Qin Shi Huang (2001 TV series)
- Rise of the Great Wall
- The Emperor and the Assassin
