= Gao Jianli =

Qin dynasty Chinese musician and failed regicide

Gao Jianli (Chinese: 高漸離) was a musician of the Chinese state of Yan, during the late Warring States period, who played a struck zither called zhu (筑) or ji zhu (击筑). A friend of failed regicide Jing Ke, he later attempted to assassinate Qin Shi Huang as well, resulting in his execution.

== Biography ==
=== Friend of Jing Ke ===
Gao Jianli was from state of Yan, and he used to be a good friend with Jing Ke. In the 220s BC, the pressure of Qin military presence was more and more harsh, the Crown Prince Dan hope to recruit a suicidal assassin to assassinate Qin Shi Huang and stop his conquering. Prince Dan sought the most lethal dagger in the realm for Jing Ke. He obtained a dagger from Madam Xu of Zhao, purchasing it for a hundred gold pieces. He then had craftsmen treat it with poison. When tested on a person, even a slight wound would instantly cause death. The dagger was thus prepared, and Jing Ke was appointed for the mission.

In the state of Yan, there was a brave youth named Qin Wuyang (Qin Kai's grandson). At the age of 13, he had already killed a man, and people did not dare meet his gaze. He was chosen to accompany Jing Ke as his aide. Jing Ke was waiting for someone to join him on the mission, but that person lived far away and had not yet arrived, so preparations were made in the meantime.

As time passed and they had not yet departed, the prince grew anxious, fearing Jing Ke might change his mind. He pleaded again, saying, "The day is nearly over. Could it be that Jing Ke has lost his resolve? I beg to send Qin Wuyang ahead." Jing Ke became angry and shouted at the prince: "Why do you urge me so? Those who go and do not return are mere children! I am to carry a dagger into the unpredictable realm of Qin – I stayed only to wait for my companion. But now, you delay me. I take my leave!" Then he departed.

Prince Dan and all those who knew of the plan dressed in white robes and hats to see them off. When they reached the banks of the Yi River, they performed a farewell ritual. As they prepared to set out, Gao Jianli played the zhu (築, a stringed instrument), and Jing Ke sang in harmony with a solemn tone. All the warriors wept. He then stepped forward and sang:

風蕭蕭兮易水寒,
壯士一去兮不復還!
The wind whips cold across the Yi River,
The hero sets out, never to return!

=== Revenge for Jing Ke ===
But the assassination was not successful, and Jing Ke was killed. After Jing Ke was killed during his assassination attempt on Qin Shi Huang, Gao changed his name and became an assistant in a wine shop, fearing reprisals from Qin Shi Huang.

Gao Jianli's skill as a zhu player eventually came to the attention of the owner of the wine shop. Qin Shi Huang heard about Gao's ability and summoned Gao to play for him. When Gao's identity was eventually revealed, Qin Shi Huang, who loved music, pardoned Gao and kept him as a palace musician, but had him blinded to prevent any potential assassination attempts.

After a few performances Qin Shi Huang had relaxed his vigilance. Sensing the change, Gao secretly hid pieces of lead in his zhu, and attempted to beat the Emperor to death with the heavy, weighted instrument when he got an opportunity. He failed in his attempt due to his blindness (the reason that the Emperor wanted him blinded in the first place) and was subsequently executed.

== Legacy ==
Many scholars and authors in China prasised Gao Jianli for his determination to avenge his country and his friendship with Jing Ke. Ruan Yu (?–212) wrote a poem for Jing and Gao:

燕丹善勇士，荊軻為上賓。

圖盡擢匕首，長驅西入秦。
素車駕白馬，相送易水津。
漸離擊筑歌，悲聲感路人。
舉坐同咨嗟，嘆氣若青雲

Prince Dan revered the valiant and bold,
Jing Ke, his honored guest of old.
A dagger he gave, with deadly grace,
To ride for Qin in fateful chase.

A chariot plain, with steeds of white,
Escorted him at dawn's first light.
By Yi River's shore, the farewell ran,
As Jianli struck the zhu with trembling hand.

A mournful tune rose through the sky,
And moved each traveler passing by.
The gathering sighed with sorrow deep,

Their breaths like clouds in azure sweep.

Tao Yuanming wrote as:

君子死知己，提劍出燕京。

素驥鳴廣陌，慷慨送我行。
雄髮指危冠，猛氣沖長纓。
飲餞易水上，四座列群英。
漸離擊悲筑，宋意唱高聲。
蕭蕭哀風逝，澹澹寒波生。

For a noble friend, the true man dies,
He draws his sword and bids goodbye.
From capital of Yan he rides with purpose dire,
White steeds neigh loud on roads entire.

With hair like flame, his tall cap high,
Fierce spirit sparks beneath the sky.
They feast him by the Yi's cold shore,
Where valiant souls line up once more.

Jianli strikes the zhu with woe,
While Song Yi lifts his voice in flow.
The mournful wind sighs through the plain,

And ripples rise on waters' strain.

== Depiction in films and TV series ==
- 1996 – The Emperor's Shadow (秦颂; literally "Ode of Qin" or "Anthem of Qin"). Directed by Zhou Xiaowen, starring Ge You as Gao Jianli.
- 1999 – The Emperor and the Assassin (荊柯刺秦王). Directed by Chen Kaige, starring Zhao Benshan as Gao Jianli.
- 2004 – Assassinator Jing Ke (荊軻傳奇). Executive producer Han Sanping, starring Peter Ho as Gao Jianli, Liu Ye as Jing Ke.
- 2007 – The Legend of Qin (animated TV series) Animation
