= Qin Shi Huang (2001 TV series) =

Chinese historical drama television series

- DVD cover art
- Also known as: Qin Shi Huang, the First Emperor; Emperor Qin Shi Huang
- 秦始皇
- Genre: Historical drama
- Written by: Zhang Tianmin; Zhang Jing
- Directed by: Yan Jiangang; Liu Wei
- Creative director: Yi Zhenzhou
- Presented by: Li Peisen
- Starring: Zhang Fengyi; Gao Ming; Song Jia; Liu Wei; Zhao Liang; Song Chunli; Fan Bingbing; Zhang Jingchu
- Opening theme: "The King of Qin Defeats the Six States" (秦王扫六合) by Han Lei
- Ending theme: "One Song Under Heaven" (天下一支歌) by Mao Amin
- Composer: Zhou Zhiyong
- Country of origin: China
- Original language: Mandarin
- No. of episodes: 32

Production
- Executive producers: Zhang Huashan; Zou Qingfang; Wang Weiguo; Li Ding
- Producers: Jin Yusheng; Zhao Huayong; Li Jianhuai; Deng Tao
- Production location: China
- Cinematography: Wang Yongchun
- Running time: ≈45 minutes per episode
- Production companies: CCTV; Wuxi CCTV Film & Television Productions

Original release
- Network: CCTV-1
- Release: 18 February – 6 March 2001

Qin Shi Huang (秦始皇) is a Chinese historical drama television series based on the life of Qin Shi Huang, the first emperor who unified China under the Qin dynasty, in 221 BC. Starring Zhang Fengyi as the titular character, the series was filmed between 1999 and 2000 and first released in 2001 in Hong Kong and Thailand, and in 2002 in Singapore. In China, the series was edited and altered by historians and experts before it was approved for broadcast on CCTV-1 in 2001.

== Synopsis ==
The series follows the life of Ying Zheng from his ascension to the throne of the Qin state at the age of 13 in 247 BC and covers major events in his early reign, such as the Battle of Hangu Pass against a coalition of rival states in 241 BC, and the rebellions by Chengjiao and Lao Ai in 239 and 238 BC, respectively. After seizing power from and eliminating the regent Lü Buwei, the king wages war against the other six major states over the next ten years, destroying them one by one and eventually unifying China under the Qin dynasty.

Having created a highly centralised empire, Ying Zheng declares himself the First Emperor (Qin Shi Huang) and enacts reforms to standardise the writing system and measurements, among other things. In the north, he sends his forces to resist barbarian invasions and construct the Great Wall. In the south, he sends troops to expand territory. At the same time, he also implements forced labour to construct the Epang Palace and his mausoleum, while ordering the burning of books and burying of Confucian scholars, whom he deems a threat.

After ruling for 37 years, the 50-year-old Ying Zheng dies of illness while on an inspection tour. He is buried in the mausoleum he built, alongside the massive Terracotta Army.

== Cast ==
- Zhang Fengyi as Ying Zheng
  - Wang Heyu as Ying Zheng (child)
- Gao Ming as Lü Buwei
- Song Jia as Lady Zhao
- Liu Wei as Li Si
- Zhao Liang as Zhao Gao
- Song Chunli as Lady Huayang
- Fan Bingbing as Princess Aruo of Chu
- Zhang Jingchu as Princess Mindai of Zhao
- Xu Huanhuan as Li Jiang
- Ma Shuliang as Lord Changping
- Guo Fazeng as Lord Shang
- Zhou Xiaopeng as Chengjiao
- Tan Tao as Fusu
- Yizhen as Lao Ai
- Chuo Eryong as King Zhuangxiang of Qin
- Deng Tao as Lady Chu
- Li Xinling as Aran
- Kou Zhenhai as Jing Ke
- He Lin as Lady Meng Jiang
- Yang Ruoxi as Ajin
- Wang Maolei as Huhai
- Zhang Heng as Lüniang
- Zhang Zhitong as Queen Dowager Xia
- Wu Yue as the Crown Prince of Zhao
- Gao Liang as Wei Liao

== International broadcasts ==
Network(s)/station(s)	Series premiere	Airing dates	Title
China	CCTV-1	2001	秦始皇
Hong Kong	TVB Jade	2001	秦始皇
Thailand	9 MCOT (9)	2001	จิ๋นซีฮ่องเต้ จอมจักรพรรดิผู้พิชิต
Vietnam	VTV3	2003	Tần Thủy Hoàng
Hong Kong	TVB Jade	2007	秦始皇
Taiwan	CTV	2007	秦始皇
Taiwan	PILI TV	3 September 2012 – 30 November 2012	秦始皇

== See also ==
- Rise of the Great Wall
- The Emperor's Shadow
- The Emperor and the Assassin
- Hero
