= Cheng Gwan-min =

Hong Kong actor (1917–1995)

Cheng Gwan-min 鄭君綿
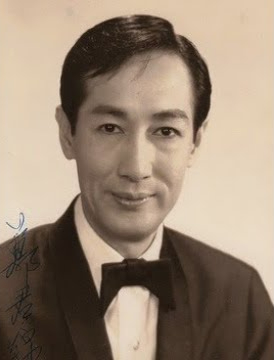
- Cheng in the 1960s
- Born: January 1, 1917; Bao'an County, Guangdong, China
- Died: August 2, 1994 (aged 77); Bao'an District, Shenzhen, Guangdong, China
- Occupation: Actor
- Years active: 1937–1994

Chinese name
- Traditional Chinese: 鄭君綿
- Simplified Chinese: 郑君绵
Transcriptions
Standard Mandarin
- Hanyu Pinyin: zhèng jūn miàn
Yue: Cantonese
- Jyutping: cheng4 gwaan1 meen2

Cheng Gwan-min (January 1, 1917 – August 2, 1994) was a Hong Kong TVB actor. He died in Bao'an District, Shenzhen at the age of 77.

A native of Bao'an county, Guangdong province, Cheng was once a theatre actor and broadcaster. In 1936, he made his debut in The Three-Day Massacre in Guangzhou in Guangzhou. During his long career of more than half a century, he made more than 200 films, mostly Cantonese.

A skillful imitator of singers from the East and the West, Cheng had numerous albums and performed Cantonese opera and musicals. He earned himself a nickname "Elvis Presley of the East".

From the 1970s onwards, he became a host of the classic variety show Enjoy Yourself Tonight, with occasional guest appearances in films.

== Filmography ==
- The Three-Day Massacre in Guangzhou (1937)
- A Wealthy Family (1947)
- Separated Too Soon (1948)
- Night Discovery of the Women's Trap (1949)
- A Pitiable Wife (1949)
- Strange Bedfellows (1949)
- Blood-Stained Azeleas (1951)
- The Talking Bird (1959)
- The Orphans (1960)
- Death to the Killer (1960)
- Ali Baba and the 40 Robbers (1960)
- Revolutionary Heroine (1960)
- Temperamental Amazon (1961)
- False Alarm (1962)
- Naughty! Naughty! (1974)
- Games Gamblers Play (1974)
- The Perfect Match (1982)
- Rise of the Great Wall (1985)
- Project A Part II (1987)
- Looking Back In Anger (1989)
- Man from Guangdong (1991)
