= Zhu (string instrument) =

Ancient Chinese string instrument

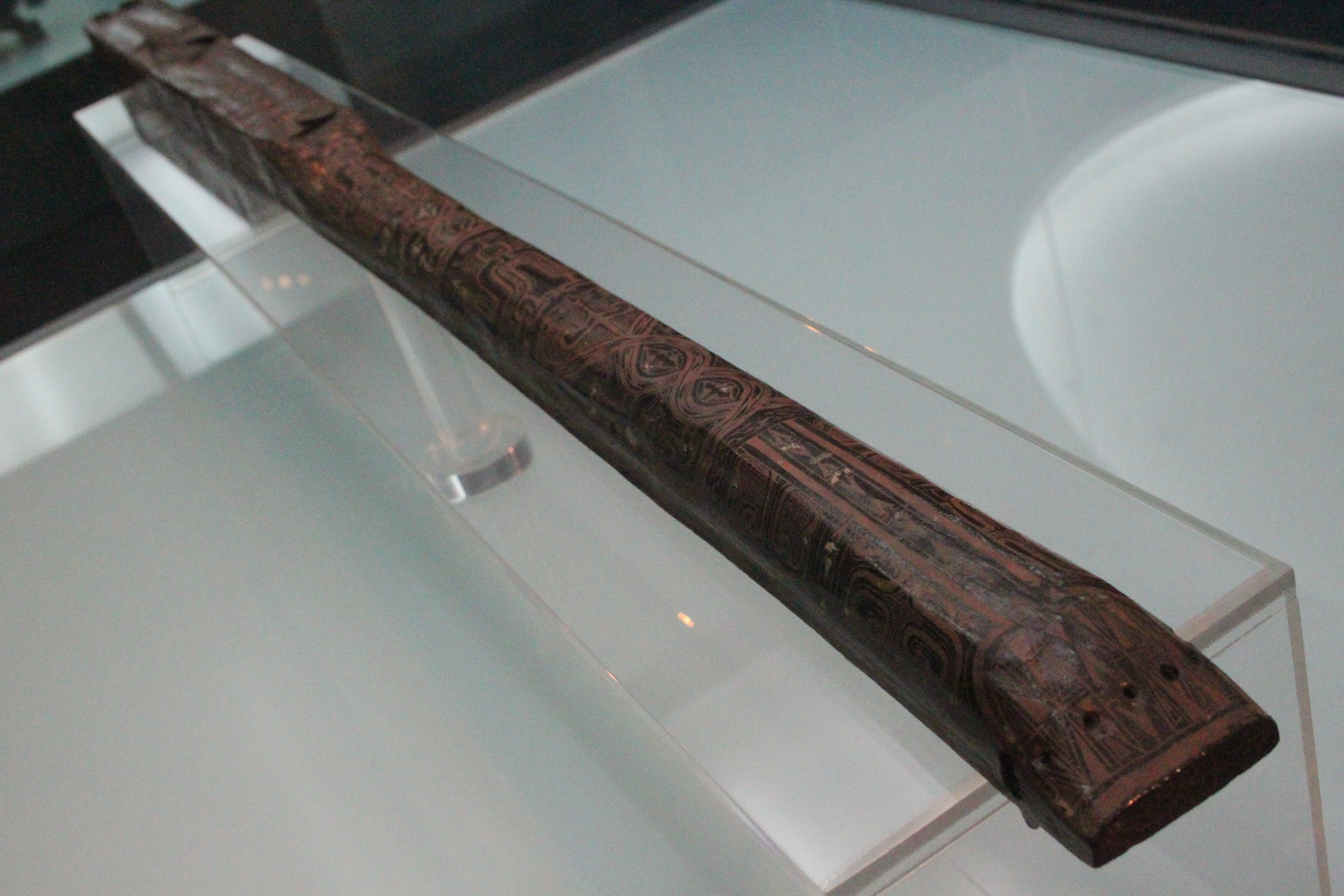
- An ancient zhu board made of wood painted in black and red lacquer, and carved with decorative patterns. The strings no longer exist.
- Traditional Chinese: 筑
- Simplified Chinese: 筑
Transcriptions
Standard Mandarin
- Hanyu Pinyin: zhù
- Yale Romanization: Jù
Yue: Cantonese
- Jyutping: zuk1

The zhu (筑; pinyin: zhù (Mainland); zhú (Taiwan)) was an ancient Chinese string instrument. Though rarely used, three very old specimens in varying degrees of preservation survive. One with five strings, dating to approximately 433 BC, was discovered in the Tomb of Marquis Yi of Zeng, in the Hubei province of central China.

It first became popular during the Warring States period, when its most famous player was Gao Jianli, a citizen of the state of Yan who attracted the attention and played for Qin Shi Huang, the first emperor of China.

The instrument remained popular through the Sui and Tang dynasties, and was lost during the Song dynasty.

Little is known about the instrument but it is believed to have been a zither with a rectangular wooden body, with silk or gut strings that were played with a slender stick. Although ancient sources state that the instrument was struck (implying that the stick was bounced on the string in the manner of a hammered dulcimer in order to elicit sound), it is possible that it was actually plucked with the bamboo stick.

== See also ==
- Traditional Chinese musical instruments
