= Huan Yi =

General of Qin

- Traditional Chinese: 桓齮
- Simplified Chinese: 桓𬺈
Transcriptions
Standard Mandarin
- Hanyu Pinyin: Huán Yǐ

Huan Yi was a general of the state of Qin in the late Warring States period (near of – 221 BCE).

== Background ==
General Pang Nuan of Zhao occupied several towns of the state of Yan in 236 BCE, whereupon Yan asked the state of Qin for help. Huan Yi, Yang Duanhe, and Wang Jian commanded the relief campaign against Zhao and took its towns Ye (today's Linzhang, Hebei) and Anyang (Hebei), as well as Eyu (Heshun, Shanxi), and Liaoyang (Zuoquan, Shanxi).

In 236 BC, the Qin generals Huan Yi and Wang Jian seize nine cities in the Yecheng region.

In 234 BC, Huan Yi attacked Pingyang (Linfen, Shanxi) and Wucheng (Cixian, Hebei), killed general Hu Zhe and massacred 100,000 troops of Zhao. He then left Shangdang, passed the Taihang Ridge and invaded Zhao by taking Chili and Yi'an (Gaocheng, Hebei). Zhao thereupon laid the supreme command in the hands of Li Mu, who defeated Huan Yi in the battle of Fei (Jinxian, Hebei).

No record of Huan Yi is found in the Shiji after his defeat at Feixia. However in the Zhan Guo Ce (a different historical source) it's mentioned that Huan Yi later died attacking Handan, the capital of Zhao, which was defended by Li Mu in one of the last Qin-Zhao battles.

== Identification with Fan Yuqi ==
When Crown Prince Dan of Yan hired Jing Ke to assassinate the king Zheng of Qin, he had asked Fan Yuqi (樊於期), a turncoat of Qin and a guest at Dan's estate at the time, for his head. Jing Ke later took Fan Yuqi's head and a dagger forged by the male blacksmith Xu Furen (徐夫人) to meet the king of Qin.

Fan Yuqi was supposed to be a former favourite general of Qin. Modern historian Yang Kuan identified Fan with Huan Yi.

== In popular culture ==
Huan Yi is portrayed by the actor Lü Xiaohe in the film The Emperor and the Assassin (1998) and by Wang Ya'nan in the television series Assassinator Jing Ke (2004).

In the manga and anime Kingdom, he is portrayed as Kan Ki (his name in onyomi) an ex-bandit leader nicknamed "The Beheader" and one of the new appointed "Qin Six Great Generals" for his prodigious skill for warfare relying mostly on unconventional tactics and psychological warfare. He initially served as one of the Vice Generals in Meng Ao's army alongside General Wang Jian. Meanwhile, Fan Yuqi (Han O Ki in onyomi) is portrayed as a separate character who rebelled against Qin under Lao Ai with Lü Buwei‘s patronage before fleeing once the war was lost.

== See also ==
- List of people who were beheaded
