= Qin Wuyang =

Failed Chinese regicide, Jing Ke's accomplice

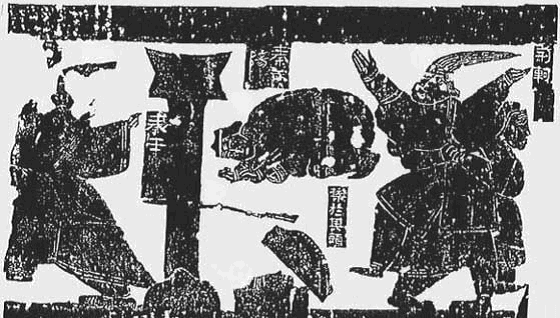
Chinese tomb mural at Han dynasty

Qin Wuyang (Chinese: 秦舞陽) was an adolescent boy who followed the assassin Jing Ke when the latter went on the mission to assassinate Ying Zheng, the king of Qin. At age twelve or thirteen, Qin Wuyang had already gained a reputation for killing and bravery.

== Legend ==
Both Jing and Qin were first disguised as envoys from Yan and were there to present the severed head of "Fan Yuqi", a Qin turncoat, and a map of Dukang. However, Qin Wuyang started sweating profusely and shivered due to nervousness and this aroused Ying Zheng's suspicion when he saw the young man. Thus, Qin Wuyang was not allowed to go near the king and present the head and map. Only Jing Ke went near but Jing Ke missed and failed to assassinate Ying Zheng. Both Jing Ke and Qin Wuyang were killed after this assassination attempt.

== Family ==
- Qin Kai (general), grandfather of Qin Wu Yang, general of Yan
