= Qin Shi Huang =

Emperor of China from 221 to 210 BC

- Huángdì
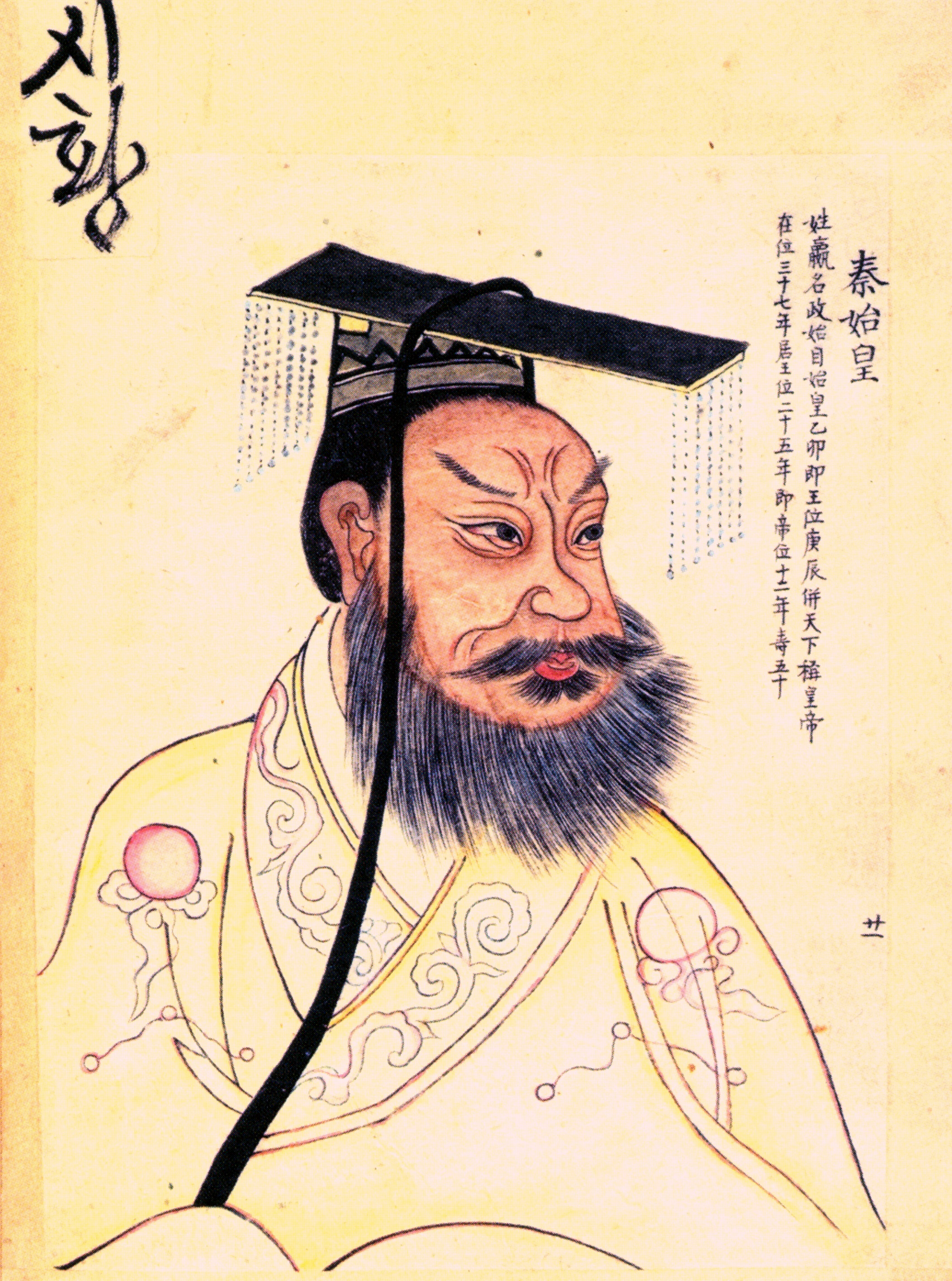
- Imaginary depiction of Qin Shi Huang, 19th century (Note: This 19th-century posthumous depiction is from a Korean book now kept in the British Library. It is based on a portrait of Qin Shi Huang from the Sancai Tuhui.)

Emperor of the Qin dynasty
- Reign: 221 BC – 12 July 210 BC (Note: Volume 90 of Treatise on Astrology of the Kaiyuan Era (8th century) indicates that he died on the yichou day of the 6th month of the 38th year of his reign (starting from his tenure as King of Qin), which corresponds to 11 July 210 BCE on the proleptic Julian calendar (始皇以六月乙丑死于沙丘...). Volume 6 of Records of the Grand Historian (1st century BC) indicates that he died on the bingyin day of the 7th month of his 38th year. While there is no bingyin day in that month, there is a bingyin day in the previous month, which corresponds to 12 July 210 BCE on the proleptic Julian calendar (七月丙寅，始皇崩于沙丘平台。) Older methods of calculation give 18 July. A few modern sources give 10 September, the bingyin day of the 8th month on the proleptic Julian calendar. Modern authors usually don't use specific dates.)
- Successor: Qin Er Shi

King of Qin
- Reign: 6 July 247 BC (Note: Volume 05 of Records of the Grand Historian indicated that King Zhuangxiang died on the bingwu day of the 5th month of the 4th year of his reign. Using the Zhuanxu calendar, the date corresponds to 6 Jul 247 BC on the proleptic Julian calendar. ([四年]...。五月丙午，庄襄王卒...)) – 221 BC
- Predecessor: King Zhuangxiang
- Successor: Position abolished (Empire)
- Born: Ying Zheng (嬴政) or Zhao Zheng (趙政); February 259 BC (Note: Volume 06 of Records of the Grand Historian indicated that Ying Zheng was born in the zhengyue of the 48th year of the reign of King Zhao(xiang) of Qin. Using the Zhuanxu calendar, the month corresponds to 27 Jan to 24 Feb 259 BC in the proleptic Julian calendar. (以秦昭王四十八年正月生于邯郸。)); Handan, Zhao
- Died: 12 July 210 BC (aged 49); Shaqiu (沙丘), Qin dynasty (in present-day Pingxiang County, Hebei)
- Burial: Mausoleum of the First Qin Emperor
- Issue: Fusu; Huhai
Names
- Ancestral name: Ying (嬴); Clan name: Zhao (趙); Given name: Zheng (政)
Regnal name
- Shi Huangdi (始皇帝)
- House: Ying
- Dynasty: Qin
- Father: King Zhuangxiang
- Mother: Queen Dowager Zhao

Qin Shi Huang (February 259 (Note: Volume 06 of Records of the Grand Historian indicated that Ying Zheng was born in the zhengyue of the 48th year of the reign of King Zhao(xiang) of Qin. Using the Zhuanxu calendar, the month corresponds to 27 Jan to 24 Feb 259 BC in the proleptic Julian calendar. (以秦昭王四十八年正月生于邯郸。)) – 12 July 210 BC) was the founder of the Qin dynasty and the first emperor of China (Chinese: 皇帝; pinyin: Huángdì). He invented the title huángdì rather than reuse the existing title for "king" (Chinese: 王; pinyin: wáng); the new title was used by monarchs in China and other countries for the next two millennia. (Note: The title Huangdi was based on the older titles of Huang, often translated as "sovereign" or "august", and Di, which denoted divinity and was used for mythical rulers. Thus the original title could be translated as "Heavenly ruler", "Divine ruler", or even "Thearch".)

Born in Handan, the capital of Zhao, as Ying Zheng (嬴政) or Zhao Zheng (趙政), his parents were King Zhuangxiang of Qin and Lady Zhao. The wealthy merchant Lü Buwei assisted him in succeeding his father as the king of Qin, after which he became King Zheng of Qin (秦王政). By 221 BC, he had conquered all the other warring states and unified all of China, and he ascended the throne as China's first emperor. During his reign, his generals greatly expanded the size of the Chinese state: campaigns south of Chu permanently added the Yue lands of Hunan and Guangdong to the Sinosphere, and campaigns in Inner Asia conquered the Ordos Plateau from the nomadic Xiongnu, although the Xiongnu later rallied under Modu Chanyu.

Qin Shi Huang also worked with his minister Li Si to enact major economic and political reforms aimed at the standardization of the diverse practices among earlier Chinese states. He is traditionally said to have banned and burned many books and executed scholars. His public works projects included the incorporation of diverse state walls into a single Great Wall of China and a massive new national road system, as well as his city-sized mausoleum guarded by a life-sized Terracotta Army. He ruled until his death in 210 BC, during his fifth tour of eastern China.

Qin Shi Huang has often been portrayed as a tyrant and strict Legalist—characterizations that stem partly from the scathing assessments made during the Han dynasty that succeeded the Qin. Since the mid-20th century, scholars have begun questioning this evaluation, inciting considerable discussion on the actual nature of his policies and reforms. According to the sinologist Michael Loewe "few would contest the view that the achievements of his reign have exercised a paramount influence on the whole of China's subsequent history, marking the start of an epoch that closed in 1911."

== Names ==
Qin Shi Huang
- "Qin Shi Huang" in seal script (top) and regular script (bottom)
- Chinese: 秦始皇
- Literal meaning: "First Emperor of Qin"
Transcriptions
Standard Mandarin
- Hanyu Pinyin: Qín Shǐ Huáng
- Bopomofo: ㄑㄧㄣˊ ㄕˇ ㄏㄨㄤˊ
- Wade–Giles: Ch'in^{2} Shih^{3} Huang^{2}
- Tongyong Pinyin: Cín Shǐh Huáng
- IPA: [tɕʰǐn ʂɻ̩̀ xwǎŋ]
Yue: Cantonese
- Yale Romanization: Chèuhn Chí Wòhng
- Jyutping: ceon4 ci2 wong4
- IPA: [tsʰɵn˩ tsʰi˧˥ wɔŋ˩]
Southern Min
- Hokkien POJ: Chîn Sí-hông
- Tâi-lô: Tsîn Sí Hông
Middle Chinese
- Middle Chinese: Dzin si^{B} hwang
Old Chinese
- Baxter (1992): *dzin hlɨjʔ waŋ
- Baxter–Sagart (2014): *dzin l̥əʔ ɢʷˤaŋ

Regnal name
- Chinese: 始皇帝
- Literal meaning: "First Emperor"
Transcriptions
Standard Mandarin
- Hanyu Pinyin: Shǐ Huángdì
- Bopomofo: ㄕˇ ㄏㄨㄤˊ ㄉㄧˋ
- Wade–Giles: Shih^{3} Huang^{2}-ti^{4}
- Tongyong Pinyin: Shǐh Huángdì
- IPA: [ʂɻ̩̀ xwǎŋ.tî]
Yue: Cantonese
- Yale Romanization: Chí Wòhng Dai
- Jyutping: ci2 wong4 dai3
- IPA: [tsʰi˧˥ wɔŋ˩.tɐj˧]
Southern Min
- Hokkien POJ: Sí Hông-tè
Old Chinese
- Baxter–Sagart (2014): *l̥əʔ ɢʷˤaŋ tˤek-s

Modern Chinese sources often give the personal name of Qin Shi Huang as Ying Zheng, with Yíng (嬴) taken as the surname and Zheng (政) the given name. However, in ancient China, the naming convention differed, and the clan name Zhao (趙), the place where he was born and raised, may be used as the surname. Unlike modern Chinese names, the nobility of ancient China had two distinct surnames: the ancestral name (姓) comprised a larger group descended from a prominent ancestor, usually said to have lived during the time of the legendary Three Sovereigns and Five Emperors, and the clan name (氏) comprised a smaller group that showed a branch's current fief or recent title.

The ancient practice was to list men's names separately—Sima Qian's "Basic Annals of the First Emperor of Qin" introduces him as "given the name Zheng and the surname Zhao" (Note: In simplified Chinese, 及生，名为政，姓赵氏. The differentiation between the two types of surnames had largely been lost well before Sima Qian's time, as can be seen from his grammatical construction using 姓 as a verb – "to be surnamed" – with the object 氏, a different kind of surname.)—or to combine the clan surname with the personal name: Sima's account of Chu describes the sixteenth year of the reign of King Kaolie as "the time when Zhao Zheng was enthroned as King of Qin". However, since modern Chinese surnames (despite usually descending from clan names) use the same character as the old ancestral names, it is much more common in modern Chinese sources to see the emperor's personal name written as Ying Zheng, (Note: See Nienhauser's gloss of the name Zhao Zheng (n. 579).) using the ancestral name of the House of Ying.

The rulers of the state of Qin had styled themselves kings from the time of King Huiwen in 325 BC. Upon his ascension, Zheng became known as the King of Qin or King Zheng of Qin. This title made him the nominal equal of the rulers of Shang and Zhou, the last of whose kings had been deposed by King Zhaoxiang of Qin in 256 BC.

Following the surrender of Qi in 221 BC, King Zheng reunited all of the lands of the former Kingdom of Zhou. Rather than maintain his rank as king, however, he created a new title of huángdì (emperor) for himself. This new title combined two titles—huáng of the mythical Three Sovereigns (三皇, Sān huáng) and the dì of the legendary Five Emperors (五帝, Wŭ Dì) of Chinese prehistory. The title was intended to appropriate some of the prestige of the Yellow Emperor, whose cult was popular in the later Warring States period and who was considered to be a founder of the Chinese people. King Zheng chose the new regnal name of First Emperor (Shǐ Huángdì, Wade-Giles Shih Huang-ti) on the understanding that his successors would be successively titled the "Second Emperor", "Third Emperor", and so on through the generations. (In fact, the scheme lasted only as long as his immediate heir, the Second Emperor.) The new title carried religious overtones. For that reason, sinologists - starting with Peter A. Boodberg or Edward H. Schafer - sometimes translate it as "thearch" and the First Emperor as the First Thearch.

The First Emperor intended that his realm would remain intact through the ages but, following its overthrow and replacement by Han after his death, it became customary to prefix his title with Qin. Thus:

- 秦, Qín or Ch'in, "of Qin"
- 始, Shǐ or Shih, "first"
- 皇帝, Huángdì or Huang-ti, "emperor", a new term (Note: While the specific title was new, also note the use of 皇天上帝 ("August Heaven Shangdi"), a conflation of the Zhou and Shang gods by the Duke of Zhou used in his addresses to the conquered Shang peoples.) coined from
  - 皇, Huáng or Huang, literally "shining" or "splendid" and formerly most usually applied "as an epithet of Heaven", a title of the Three Sovereigns, the high god of the Zhou
  - 帝, Dì or Ti, the high god of the Shang dynasty, possibly composed of their divine ancestors, and used by the Zhou as a title of the legendary Five Emperors, particularly the Yellow Emperor

As early as Sima Qian, it was common to shorten the resulting four-character Qin Shi Huangdi to 秦始皇, variously transcribed as Qin Shihuang or Qin Shi Huang.

Following his elevation as emperor, both Zheng's personal name 政 and possibly its homophone 正 (Note: That both were forbidden has been the general understanding of historians but Beck cites numerous sources from the era employing the latter character in support of the argument that it was not forbidden until the reign of the Second Emperor of Qin.) became taboo. (Note: His father's name 子楚 also became taboo, prompting references to Chu to be replaced by its original name "Jing" (荆).) The First Emperor also arrogated the first-person pronoun 朕 for his exclusive use, and in 212 BC began calling himself "The Immortal" (真人; zhēnrén). Others were to address him as "Your Majesty" (陛下; bìxià) in person and "Your Highness" (上; shàng) in writing.

== Birth and parentage ==
According to the Shiji written by Sima Qian during the Han dynasty, the first emperor was the eldest son of the Qin prince Yiren, who later became King Zhuangxiang of Qin. Prince Yiren at that time was residing at the court of Zhao, serving as a hostage to guarantee the armistice between Qin and Zhao. Prince Yiren had fallen in love at first sight with a concubine of Lü Buwei, a rich merchant from the state of Wey. Lü consented for her to be Yiren's wife, who then became known as Lady Zhao after the state of Zhao. He was given the name Zhao Zheng, the name Zheng (正) came from his month of birth Zhengyue, the first month of the Chinese lunar calendar; the clan name of Zhao came from his father's lineage and was unrelated to either his mother's name or the location of his birth. (Song Zhong says that his birthday, significantly, was on the first day of Zhengyue.) Lü Buwei's machinations later helped Yiren become King Zhuangxiang of Qin in 250 BC.

However, the Shiji also claimed that the first emperor was not the actual son of Prince Yiren but that of Lü Buwei. According to this account, when Lü Buwei introduced the dancing girl to the prince, she was Lü Buwei's concubine and had already become pregnant by him, and the baby was born after an unusually long period of pregnancy. According to translations of the Lüshi Chunqiu, Zhao Ji gave birth to the future emperor in the city of Handan in 259 BC, the first month of the 48th year of King Zhaoxiang of Qin.

The idea that the emperor was an illegitimate child, widely believed throughout Chinese history, contributed to the generally negative view of the First Emperor. However, a number of modern scholars have doubted this account of his birth. Sinologist Derk Bodde wrote: "There is good reason for believing that the sentence describing this unusual pregnancy is an interpolation added to the Shiji by an unknown person to slander the First Emperor and indicate his political as well as natal illegitimacy". John Knoblock and Jeffrey Riegel, in their translation of Lü Buwei's Lüshi Chunqiu, call the story "patently false, meant both to libel Lü and to cast aspersions on the First Emperor". Claiming Lü Buwei—a merchant—as the First Emperor's biological father was meant to be especially disparaging, since later Confucian society regarded merchants as the lowest social class.

== Reign as King of Qin ==
=== Regency ===
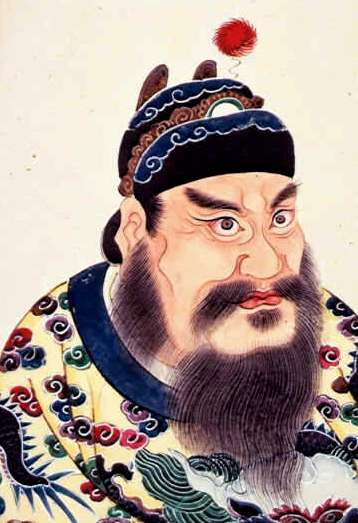
An 18th-century portrait of Qin Shi Huang

In 246 BC, when King Zhuangxiang died after a short reign of just three years, he was succeeded on the throne by his 13-year-old son. At the time, Zhao Zheng was still young, so Lü Buwei acted as the regent prime minister of the State of Qin, which was still waging war against the other six states. Nine years later, in 235 BC, Zhao Zheng assumed full power after Lü Buwei was banished for his involvement in a scandal with Queen Dowager Zhao.

Zhao Chengjiao, the Lord Chang'an (长安君), was Zhao Zheng's legitimate half-brother, by the same father but from a different mother. After Zhao Zheng inherited the throne, Chengjiao rebelled at Tunliu and surrendered to the state of Zhao. Chengjiao's remaining retainers and families were executed by Zhao Zheng.

=== Lao Ai's attempted coup ===
As King Zheng grew older, Lü Buwei became fearful that the boy king would discover his liaison with his mother, Lady Zhao. He decided to distance himself and look for a replacement for the queen dowager. He found a man named Lao Ai. According to The Record of Grand Historian, Lao Ai was disguised as a eunuch by plucking his beard. Later Lao Ai and queen Zhao Ji got along so well that they secretly had two sons together. Lao Ai was ennobled as Marquis, and was showered with riches. Lao Ai had been planning to replace King Zheng with one of his own sons, but during a dinner party he was heard bragging about being the young king's stepfather. In 238 BC, while the king was travelling to the former capital, Yong (雍), Lao Ai seized the queen mother's seal and mobilized an army in an attempted coup d'état. When notified of the rebellion, King Zheng ordered Lü Buwei to let Lord Changping and Lord Changwen attack Lao Ai. Although the royal army killed hundreds of rebels at the capital, Lao Ai successfully fled the battlefield.

A price of 1 million copper coins was placed on Lao Ai's head if he was taken alive or half a million if dead. Lao Ai's supporters were captured and beheaded; then Lao Ai was tied up and torn to five pieces by horse carriages, while his entire family was executed to the third degree. The two hidden sons were also killed, while the mother Zhao Ji was placed under house arrest until her death many years later. Lü Buwei drank a cup of poisoned wine and committed suicide in 235 BC. Ying Zheng then assumed full power as the King of the Qin state. Replacing Lü Buwei, Li Si became the new chancellor.

=== First assassination attempt ===
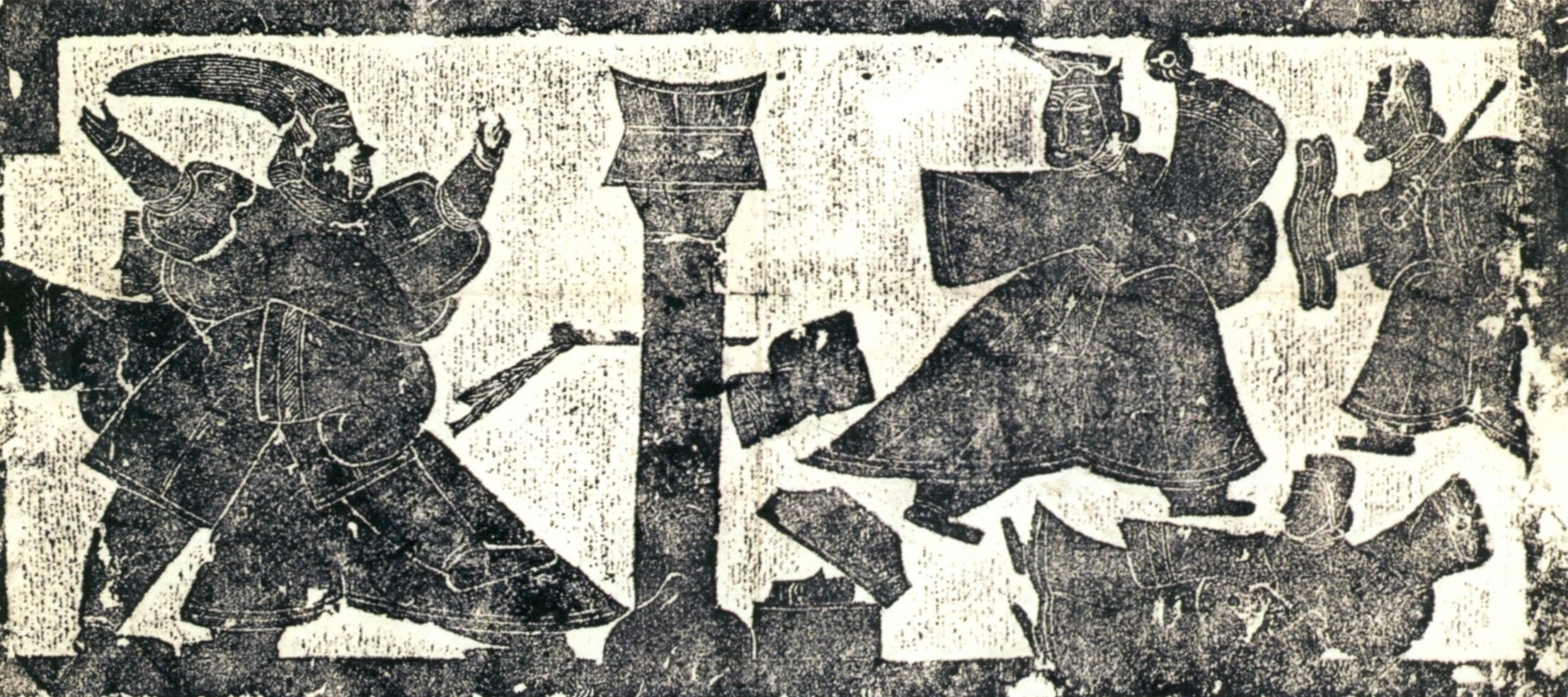
Jing Ke's assassination attempt on Qin Shi Huang; Jing Ke (left) is held by one of Qin Shi Huang's physicians (left, background). The dagger used in the assassination attempt is seen stuck in the pillar. Qin Shi Huang (right) is seen holding an imperial jade disc. One of his soldiers (far right) rushes to save his emperor – stone rubbing, Eastern Han (3rd century).

King Zheng and his troops continued their conquest of the neighbouring states. The state of Yan was no match for the Qin states: small and weak, it had already been harassed frequently by Qin soldiers. Crown Prince Dan of Yan plotted an assassination attempt against King Zheng, recruiting Jing Ke and Qin Wuyang for the mission in 227 BC.

The assassins gained access to King Zheng by pretending a diplomatic gifting of goodwill: a map of Dukang and the severed head of Fan Wuji. Qin Wuyang stepped forward first to present the map case but was overcome by fear. Jing Ke then advanced with both gifts, while explaining that his partner was trembling because "[he] had never set eyes on the Son of Heaven". When the dagger unrolled from the map, the king leapt to his feet and struggled to draw his sword – none of his courtiers were allowed to carry arms in his presence. Jing stabbed at the king but missed, and King Zheng slashed Jing's thigh. In desperation, Jing Ke threw the dagger but missed again. He surrendered after a brief fight in which he was further injured. The Yan state was conquered in its entirety five years later.

=== Second assassination attempt ===
Gao Jianli was a close friend of Jing Ke, and wanted to avenge his death. As a famous zhu player, he was summoned to play for King Zheng. Someone in the palace recognized him and guessed his plans. Reluctant to kill such a skilled musician, the king ordered his eyes put out, and then proceeded with the performance. The king praised Gao's playing and even allowed him closer. The zhu had been weighted with a slab of lead, and Gao Jianli swung it at the king but missed. The second assassination attempt had failed; Gao was executed shortly after.

=== Unification of China ===
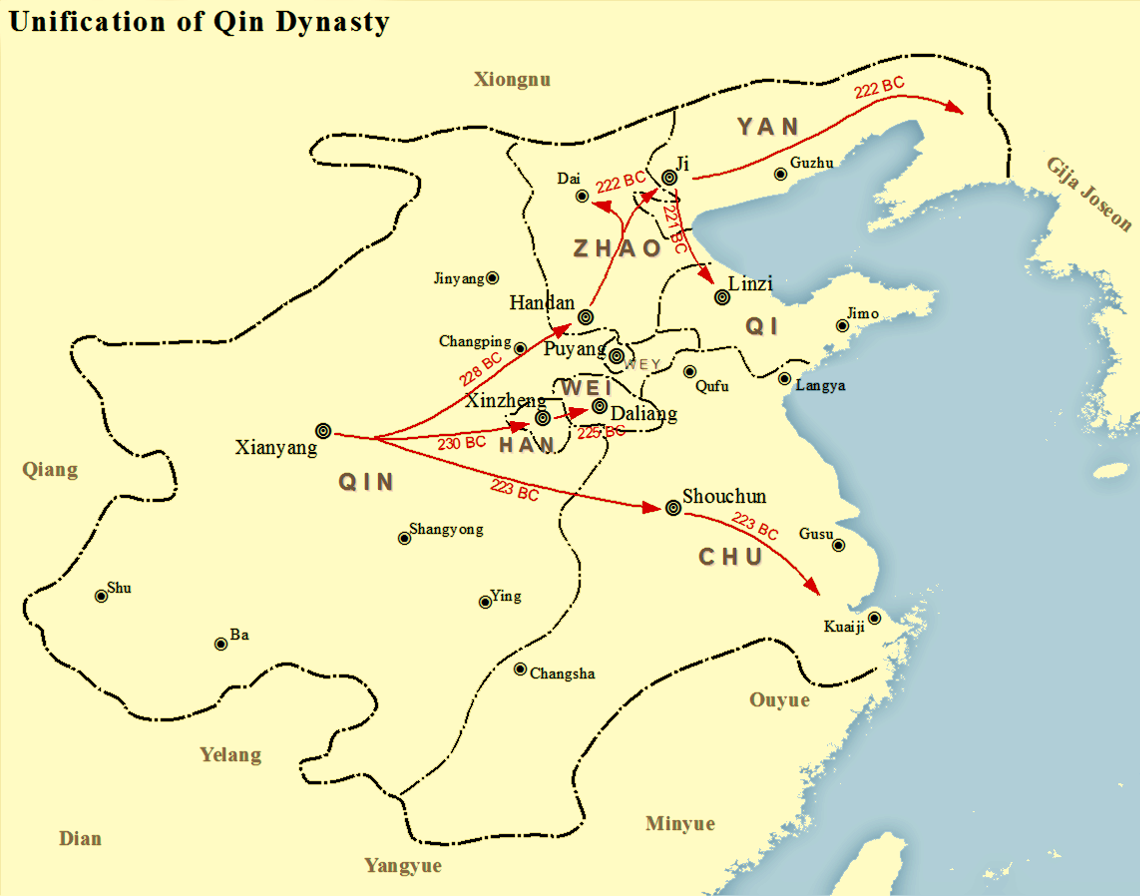
Qin's unification of the Seven Warring States

In 230 BC, King Zheng began the final campaigns of the Warring States period, setting out to conquer the remaining six major Chinese states and bring China under unified Qin control.

In the 17th Year of Qin Shi Huang's reign (230 BCE), Qin sent Neishi Teng (內史騰) to conquer Han, capturing King An of Han, taking over all Han territory, establishing the Yingchuan Commandery (潁川郡) The following year (229 BCE), The Qin army, commanded by Wang Jian, Yang Duanhe, Qiang Lei, and Li Xin invaded Zhao, which had been severely weakened by natural disasters, and captured the capital of Handan in 228. Prince Jia of Zhao managed to escape with the remnants of the Zhao army and established the short-lived state of Dai, proclaiming himself king.

In 227 BC, fearing a Qin invasion, Crown Prince Dan of Yan ordered a failed assassination attempt on King Zheng. This provided casus belli for Zheng to invade Yan in 226, capturing the capital of Ji (modern Beijing) that same year. The remnants of the Yan army, along with King Xi of Yan, were able to retreat to the Liaodong Peninsula.

After Qin besieged and flooded their capital of Daliang, the state of Wei surrendered in 225 BC. Around this time, as a precautionary measure, Qin seized ten cities from Chu, the largest and most powerful of the other Warring States. In 224, Qin launched a full-scale invasion of Chu, capturing the capital of Shouchun in 223. In 222, Qin armies extinguished the last Yan remnants in Liaodong and the Zhao rump state of Dai. In 221, Qin armies invaded the state of Qi and captured King Jian of Qi without much resistance, bringing an end to the Warring States period.

By 221 BC, all Chinese lands had been unified under the Qin. To elevate himself above the feudal Zhou kings, King Zheng proclaimed himself the First Emperor, creating the title which would be used as the title of the Chinese sovereign for the next two millennia. Qin Shi Huang also ordered the Heshibi to be crafted into the Heirloom Seal of the Realm, which would serve as a physical symbol of the Mandate of Heaven, and would be passed from emperor to emperor until its loss in the 10th century.

During 215 BC, in an attempt to expand Qin territory, Qin Shi Huang ordered military campaigns against the Xiongnu nomads in the North. Led by General Meng Tian, Qin armies successfully routed the Xiongnu from the Ordos Plateau, setting the ancient foundations for the construction of the Great Wall of China. In the South, Qin Shi Huang also ordered several military campaigns against the Yue tribes, which annexed various regions in modern Guangdong and Vietnam.

== Reign as Emperor of Qin ==
=== Administrative reforms ===
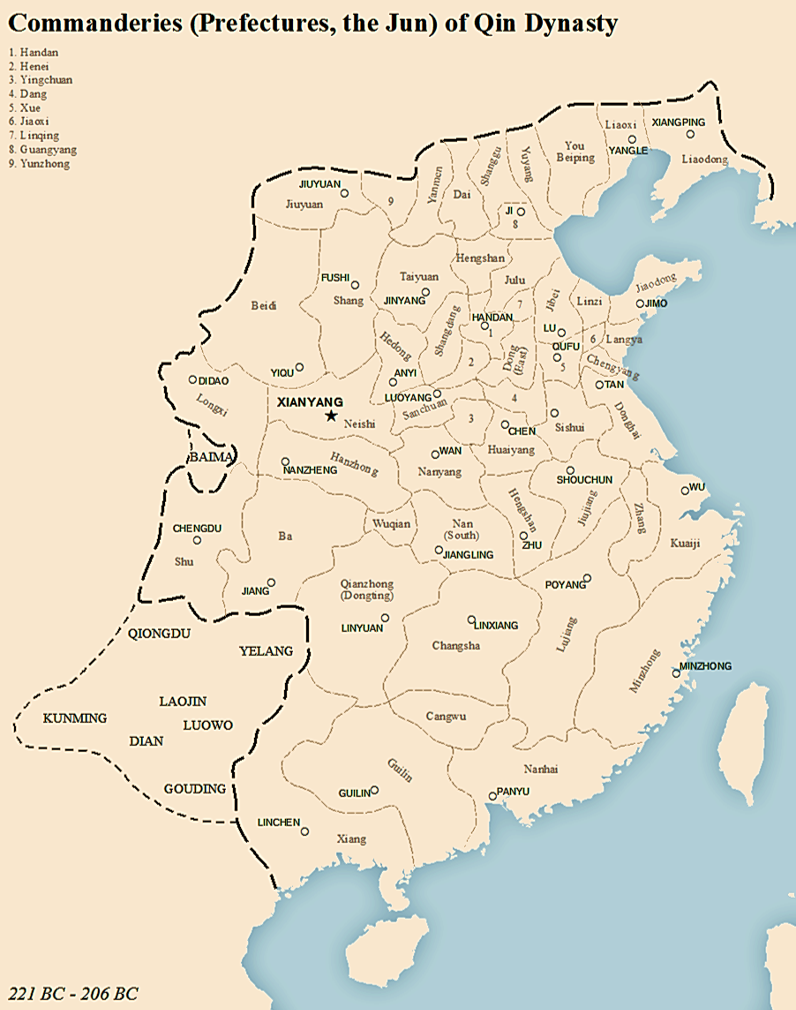
Administrative divisions of Qin

In an attempt to avoid a recurrence of the political chaos of the Warring States period, Qin Shi Huang and Li Si worked to completely abolish the feudal system of loose alliances and federations. They organized the empire into administrative units and subunits: first 36 (later 40) commanderies, then counties, townships, and hundred-family units (里, Li, roughly corresponding to modern-day subdistricts and communities). People assigned to these units would no longer be identified by their native region or former feudal state, for example "Chu person" (楚人, Chu rén). Appointments were to be based on merit instead of hereditary right.

=== Economic reforms ===
Qin Shi Huang and Li Si unified China economically by standardizing the weights and measurements. Wagon axles were prescribed a standard length to facilitate road transport. The emperor also developed an extensive network of roads and canals for trade and communication. The currencies of the different states were standardized to the Ban Liang coin. The forms of Chinese characters were unified. Under Li Si, the seal script of the state of Qin became the official standard, and the Qin script itself was simplified through removal of variant forms. This did away with all the regional scripts to form a universal written language for all of China, despite the diversity of spoken dialects.

=== Monumental statuary ===
According to Chinese records, after unifying the country in 221 BC, Qin Shuhuang confiscated all the bronze weapons of the conquered countries, and cast them into twelve monumental statues, the Twelve Metal Colossi, which he used to adorn his Palace. Each statue was said to be 5 zhang [11.5 meters] in height, and weighing about 1000 dan [about 70 tons]. Sima Qian considered this as one of the great achievements of the Emperor, on a par with the "unification of the law, weights and measurements, standardization of the axle width of carriages, and standardization of the writing system". During 600 years, the statues were commented upon and moved around from palace to palace, until they were finally destroyed in the 4th century AD, but no illustration has remained.

=== Philosophy ===
While the previous Warring States era was one of constant warfare, it was also considered the golden age of free thought. Qin Shi Huang eliminated the Hundred Schools of Thought, which included Confucianism and other philosophies. With all other philosophies banned, Legalism became the mandatory ideology of the Qin dynasty.

Beginning in 213 BC, at the instigation of Li Si and to avoid scholars' comparisons of his reign with the past, Qin Shi Huang ordered most existing books to be burned, with the exception of those on astrology, agriculture, medicine, divination, and the history of the state of Qin. This would also serve to further the ongoing reformation of the writing system by removing examples of obsolete scripts. Owning the Classic of Poetry or the Book of Documents was to be punished especially severely. According to the later Shiji, the following year Qin Shi Huang had some 460 scholars buried alive for possessing the forbidden books. The emperor's oldest son Fusu criticized him for this act. The emperor's own library did retain copies of the forbidden books, but most of these were destroyed when Xiang Yu burned the palaces of Xianyang in 206 BC.

Recent research suggests that this "burying Confucian scholars alive" is a Confucian martyrs' legend. More probably, the emperor ordered the execution of a group of alchemists who had deceived him. In the subsequent Han dynasty, the Confucian scholars, who had served the Qin loyally, used this incident to distance themselves from the failed regime. Kong Anguo (c. 165 – c. 74 BC), a descendant of Confucius, described the alchemists as Confucianists and entwined the martyrs' legend with his story of discovering the lost Confucian books behind a demolished wall in his ancestral house.

Qin Shi Huang also followed the theory of the five elements: fire, water, earth, wood, and metal. It was believed that the royal house of the previous Zhou dynasty had ruled by the power of fire, associated with the colour red. The new Qin dynasty must be ruled by the next element on the list, which is water, Zhao Zheng's birth element. Water was represented by the colour black, and black became the preferred colour for Qin garments, flags, and pennants. Other associations include north as the cardinal direction, the winter season and the number six. Tallies and official hats were 15 centimetres (5.9 inches) long, carriages two metres (6.6 feet) wide, one pace (步; bù) was 1.4 m (4.6 ft).

=== Third assassination attempt ===
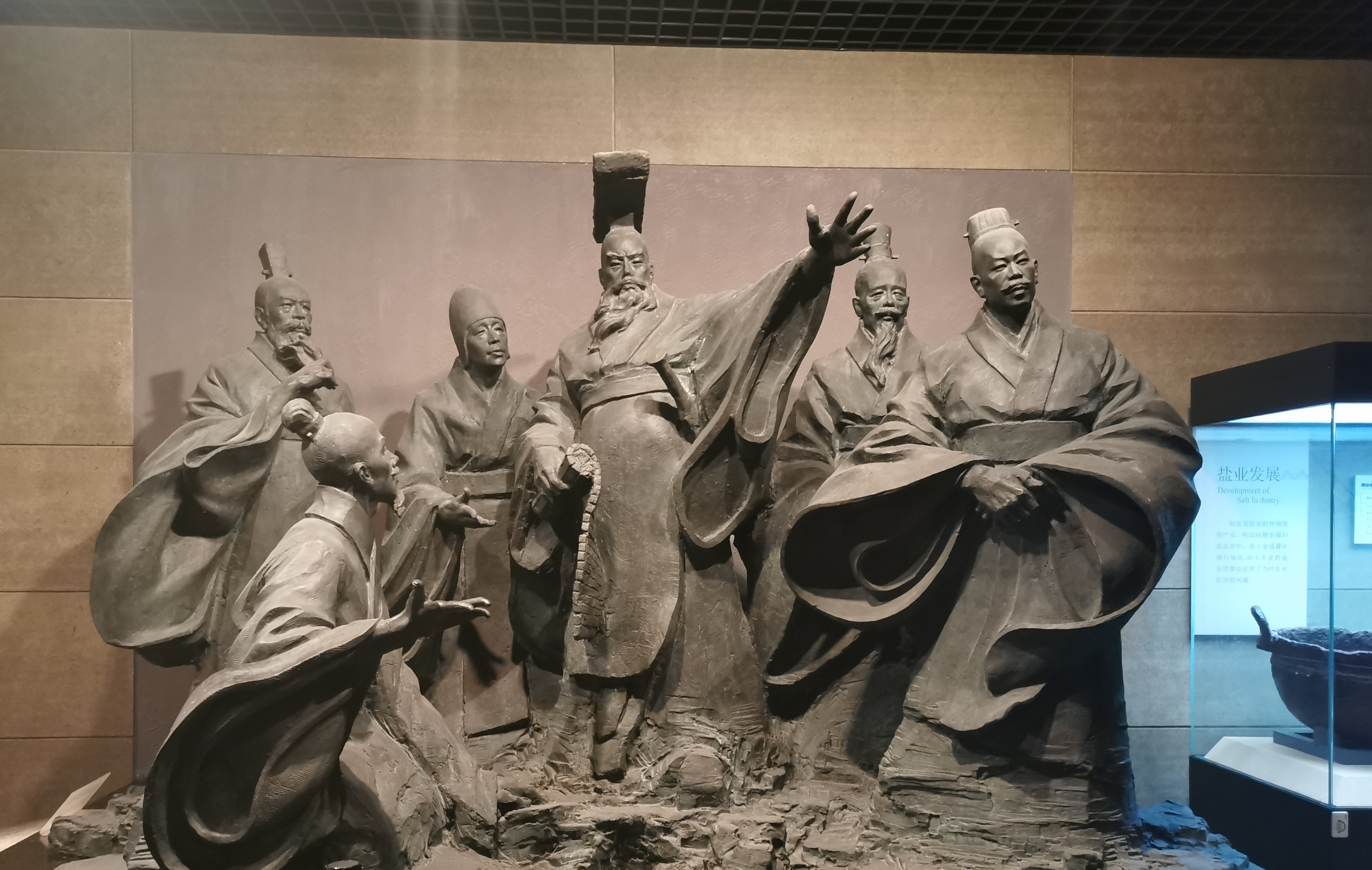
Modern sculpture depicting Qin Shi Huang on his imperial tour

In 230 BC, the state of Qin had defeated the state of Han. In 218, a former Han aristocrat named Zhang Liang swore revenge on Qin Shi Huang. He sold his valuables and hired a strongman assassin, building a heavy metal cone weighing 120 jin (roughly 160 lb or 97 kg). The two men hid among the bushes along the emperor's route over a mountain during his third imperial tour. At a signal, the muscular assassin hurled the cone at the first carriage and shattered it. However, the emperor was travelling with two identical carriages to baffle attackers, and he was actually in the second carriage. Thus the attempt failed, though both men were able to escape the subsequent manhunt.

=== Public works ===
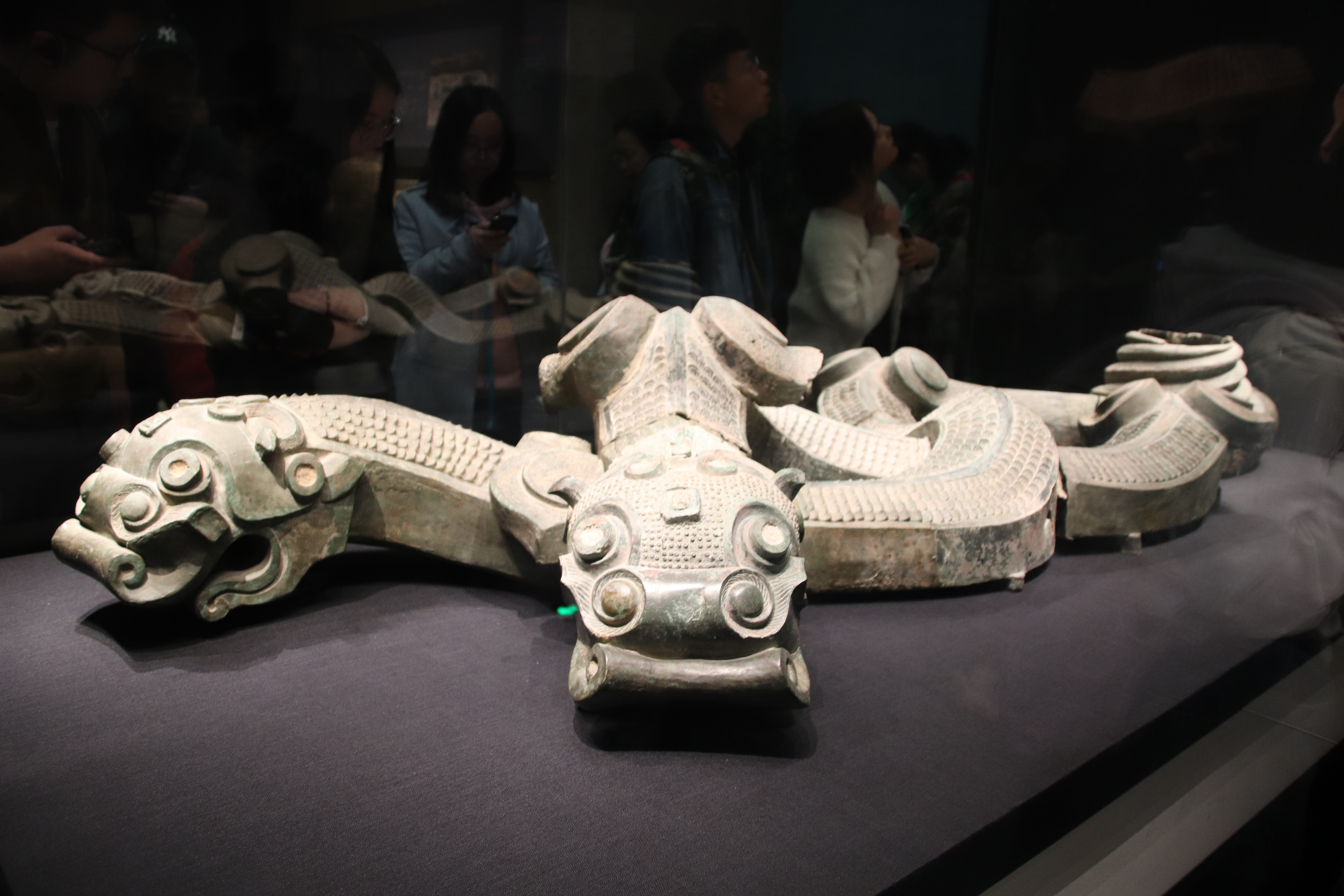
Qin dynasty twin bronze dragons, found near the Mausoleum of the First Qin Emperor

==== Great Wall ====
Numerous state walls had been built during the previous four centuries, many of them closing gaps between river defences and impassable cliffs. To impose centralized rule and prevent the resurgence of feudal lords, the Emperor ordered the destruction of walls between the former states, which were now internal walls dividing the empire.

However, to defend against the northern Xiongnu nomads, who had beaten back repeated campaigns against them, he ordered new walls to connect the fortifications along the empire's northern frontier. Hundreds of thousands of workers were mobilized, and an unknown number died, to build this precursor to the current Great Wall of China. Transporting building materials was difficult, so builders always tried to use local materials: rock over mountain ranges, rammed earth over the plains. "Build and move on" was a guiding principle, implying that the Wall was not a permanently fixed border. There are no surviving records specifying the length and course of the Qin walls, which have largely eroded away over the centuries.

==== Lingqu Canal ====
In 214 BC, the Emperor began the project of a major canal allowing water transport between north and south China, originally for military supplies. The canal, 34 kilometres in length, links two of China's major waterways, the Xiang River flowing into the Yangtze and the Lijiang River, flowing into the Pearl River. The canal aided Qin's expansion to the south-west. It is considered one of the three great feats of ancient Chinese engineering, along with the Great Wall and the Sichuan Dujiangyan Irrigation System.

=== Elixir of life ===
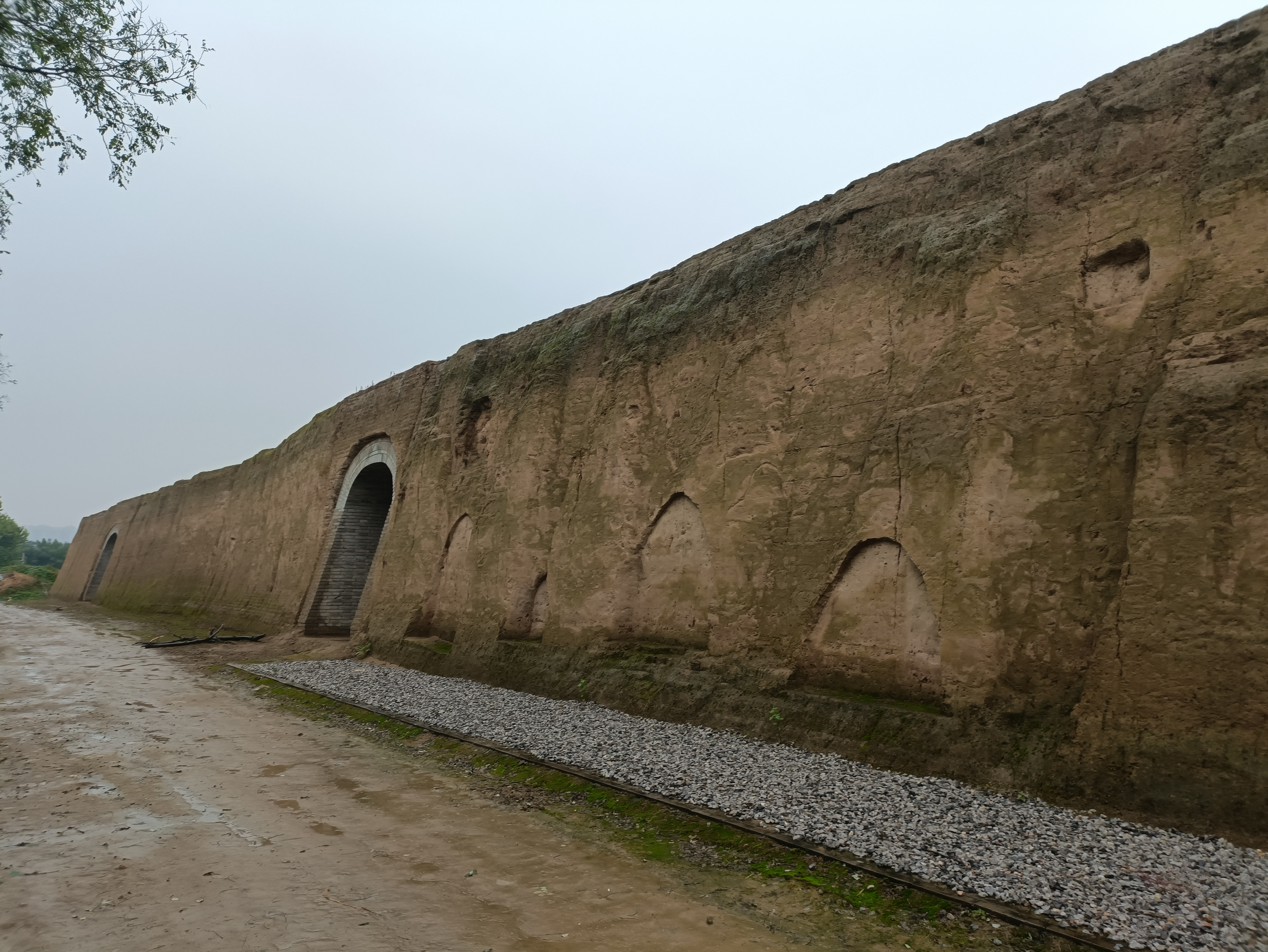
The Epang Palace in Xi'an, destroyed in 206 BC

As he grew old, Qin Shi Huang desperately sought the fabled elixir of life which supposedly confers immortality. In his obsessive quest, he fell prey to many fraudulent elixirs. He visited Zhifu Island three times in his search.

In one case he sent Xu Fu, a Zhifu islander, with ships carrying hundreds of young men and women in search of the mystical Mount Penglai. They sought Anqi Sheng, a thousand-year-old magician who had supposedly invited Qin Shi Huang during a chance meeting during his travels. The expedition never returned, perhaps for fear of the consequences of failure. Legends claim that they reached Japan and colonized it.

It is also possible that the Emperor's book burning, which exempted alchemical works, could be seen as an attempt to focus the minds of the best scholars on the Emperor's quest. Some of those buried alive were alchemists, and this could have been a means of testing their death-defying abilities.

The emperor built a system of tunnels and passageways to each of his over 200 palaces, because travelling unseen would supposedly keep him safe from evil spirits.

== Final years ==
=== Death ===
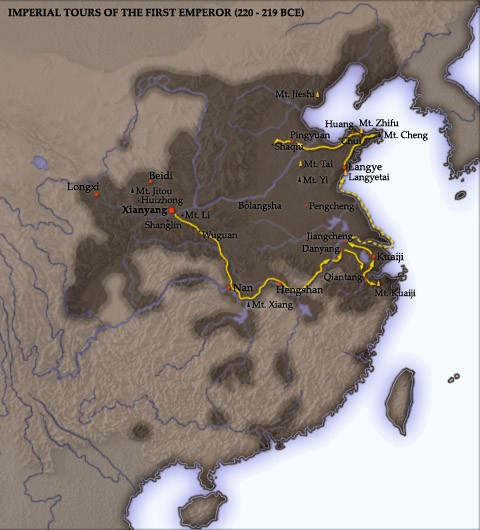
Imperial tours of Qin Shi Huang

In 211 BC, a large meteor is said to have fallen in Dongjun in the lower reaches of the Yellow River, and someone inscribed the seditious words "The First Emperor will die and his land will be divided" (始皇死而地分; Shǐ huáng sǐ ér dì fēn). The Emperor sent an imperial secretary to investigate this prophecy. No one would confess to the deed, so all living nearby were put to death, and the stone was pulverized.

During his fifth tour of eastern China, the Emperor became seriously ill in Pingyuanjin (Pingyuan County, Shandong), and died in July or August of 210 BC, at the palace in Shaqiu prefecture, about two months' travel from Xianyang, at the age of 49.

The cause of Qin Shi Huang's death remains unknown, though he had been worn down by his many years of rule. One hypothesis holds that he was poisoned by an elixir containing mercury, given to him by his court alchemists and physicians in his quest for immortality.

=== Succession ===
Upon witnessing the Emperor's death, Chancellor Li Si feared the news could trigger a general uprising during the two months' travel for the imperial entourage to return to the capital Xianyang. Li Si decided to hide the emperor's death: the only members of the entourage to be informed were a younger son, Ying Huhai, the eunuch Zhao Gao, and five or six favourite eunuchs. Li Si ordered carts of rotten fish to be carried before and behind the wagon of the Emperor, to cover the foul smell of his body decomposing in the summer heat. Pretending he was alive behind the wagon's shade, they changed his clothes daily, brought food, and pretended to carry messages to and from him.

After they reached Xianyang, the death of the Emperor was announced. Qin Shi Huang had not liked to talk about his death and had never written a will. Although his eldest son Fusu was first in line to succeed him as emperor, Li Si and the chief eunuch Zhao Gao conspired to kill Fusu, who was in league with their enemy, general Meng Tian. (This was revenge, as Meng Tian's brother Meng Yi, a senior minister, had once punished Zhao Gao.) Li Si and Zhao Gao forged a letter from Qin Shi Huang commanding Fusu and General Meng to commit suicide. The plan worked, and the younger son Hu Hai started his brief reign as the Second Emperor, later known as Qin Er Shi or "Second Generation Qin".

== Family ==
The immediate family members of Qin Shi Huang include:

- Parents
  - King Zhuangxiang of Qin
  - Queen Dowager Zhao
- Half-siblings:
  - Chengjiao, Lord of Chang'an, legitimate paternal half-brother from a different mother
  - Two illegitimate maternal half-brothers born to Queen Dowager Zhao and Lao Ai.
- Children:
  - Fusu, Crown Prince (1st son)
  - Gao
  - Jianglü
  - Huhai, later Qin Er Shi (18th son)

Qin Shi Huang had about 50 children (about 30 sons and 15 daughters), but most of their names are unknown. He had numerous concubines but appeared to have never named an empress.

Qin dynasty

See Family tree of Qin
Zheng 政 259–210 BC King of Qin 秦王 r. 247–221 BC Qin Shi Huang 秦始皇 r. 221–210 BC
1	18 or 25 (disputed)
Fusu 扶蘇 d. 210 BC	Huhai 胡亥; 229–207 BC Qin Er Shi 秦二世 r. 210–207 BC
Ziying 子嬰 d. 206 BC King of Qin r. 207 BC

== Legacy ==
=== Mausoleum and Terracotta Army ===
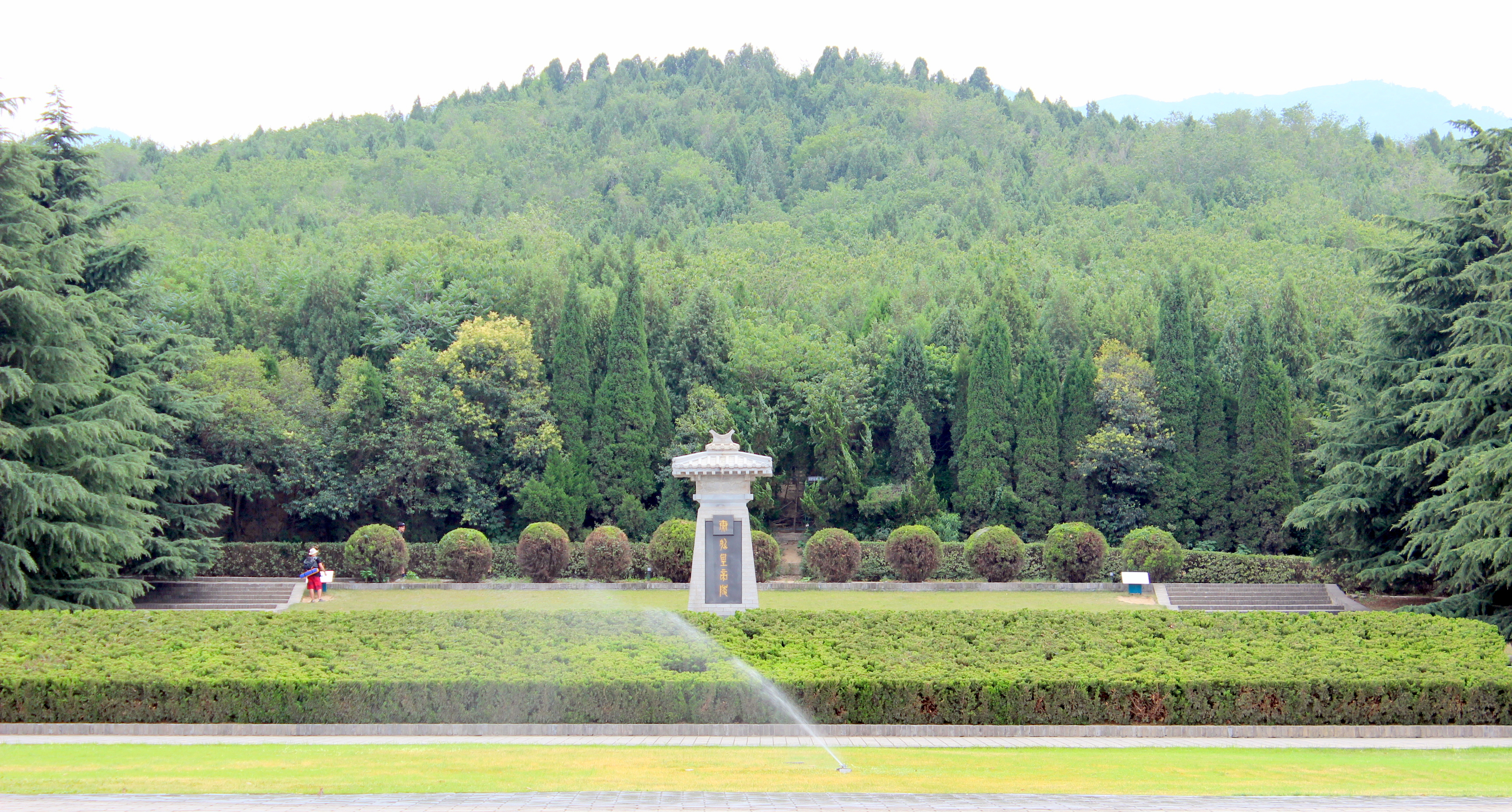
Mount Li - The Mausoleum of the First Emperor of China where Qin Shi Huang was ultimately interred.

Sima Qian, writing a century after the First Emperor's death, wrote that it took 700,000 men to construct the emperor's mausoleum. British historian John Man points out that this figure is larger than the population of any city in the world at that time and he calculates that the foundations could have been built by 16,000 men in two years. Sima Qian never mentioned the Terracotta Army, but he did mention that the Qin Emperor built monumental bronze statues for his palace. The terracotta statues were discovered by a group of farmers digging wells on 29 March 1974. The soldiers were created with a series of mix-and-match clay molds and then further individualized by the artists' hand. Han Purple was also used on some of the warriors. There are around 6,000 statues excavated, whose purpose was to protect the Emperor in the afterlife. Also among the army are chariots and 40,000 real bronze weapons.

Visual tour of the three main Terracotta Army pits (no audio).

One of the first projects which the young king accomplished while he was alive was the construction of his own tomb. In 215 BC Qin Shi Huang ordered General Meng Tian to begin its construction with the assistance of 300,000 men. Other sources suggest that he ordered 720,000 unpaid laborers to build his tomb according to his specifications. Again, given John Man's observation regarding populations at the time (see paragraph above), these historical estimates are debatable. The main tomb (located at 34°22′53″N 109°15′13″E) containing the emperor has yet to be opened and evidence suggests that it remains relatively intact. Sima Qian's description of the tomb includes replicas of palaces and scenic towers, "rare utensils and wonderful objects", 100 rivers made with mercury, representations of "the heavenly bodies", and crossbows rigged to shoot anyone who tried to break in. The tomb was built at the foot of Mount Li, 30 kilometers away from Xi'an. Modern archaeologists have located the tomb, and have inserted probes deep into it. The probes revealed abnormally high quantities of mercury, some 100 times the naturally occurring rate, suggesting that some parts of the legend are credible. Secrets were maintained, as most of the workmen who built the tomb were killed.

Pit 1 of the Terracotta Army Museum, Xian.

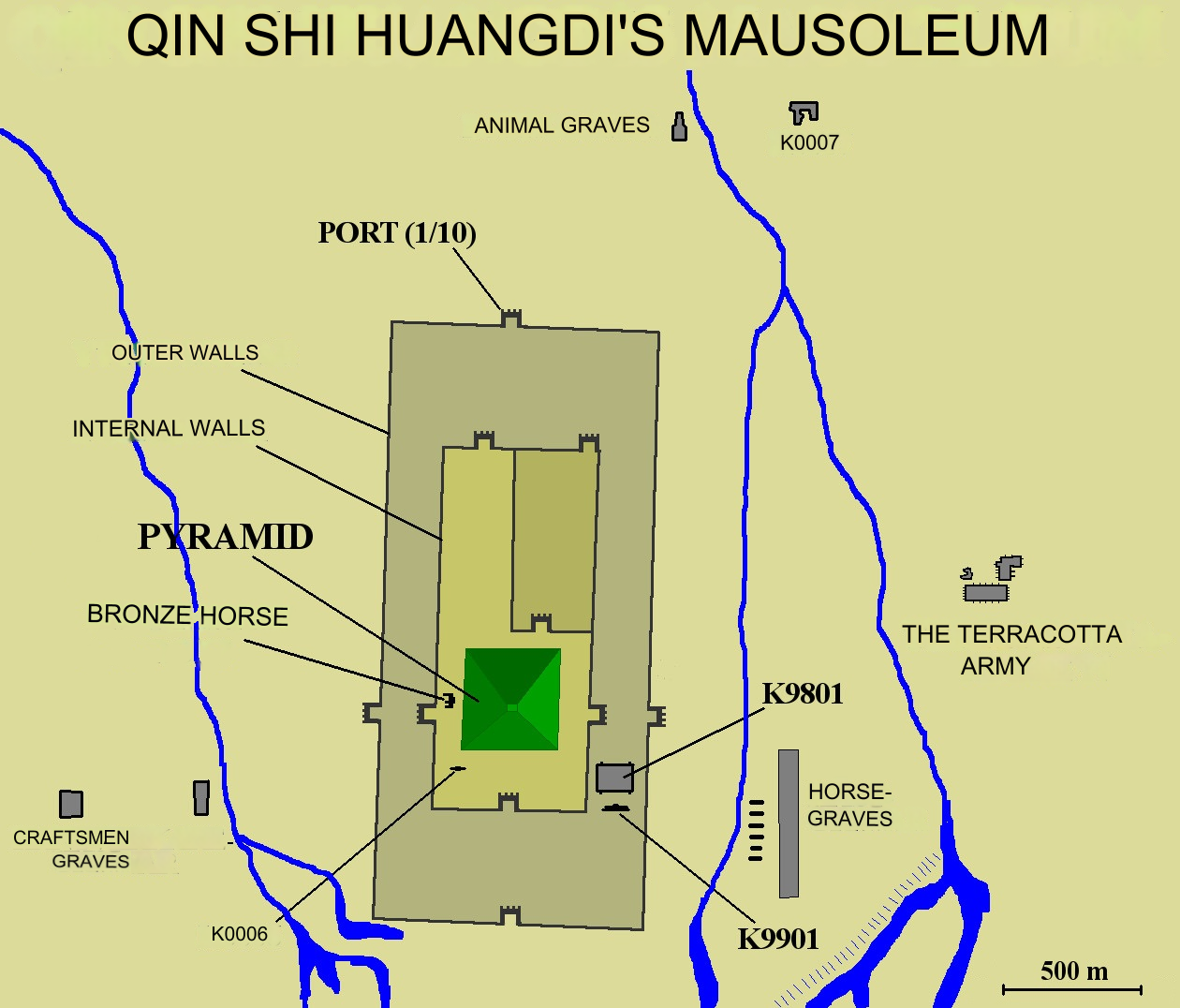
Plan of the Qin Shi Huang Mausoleum (expand)

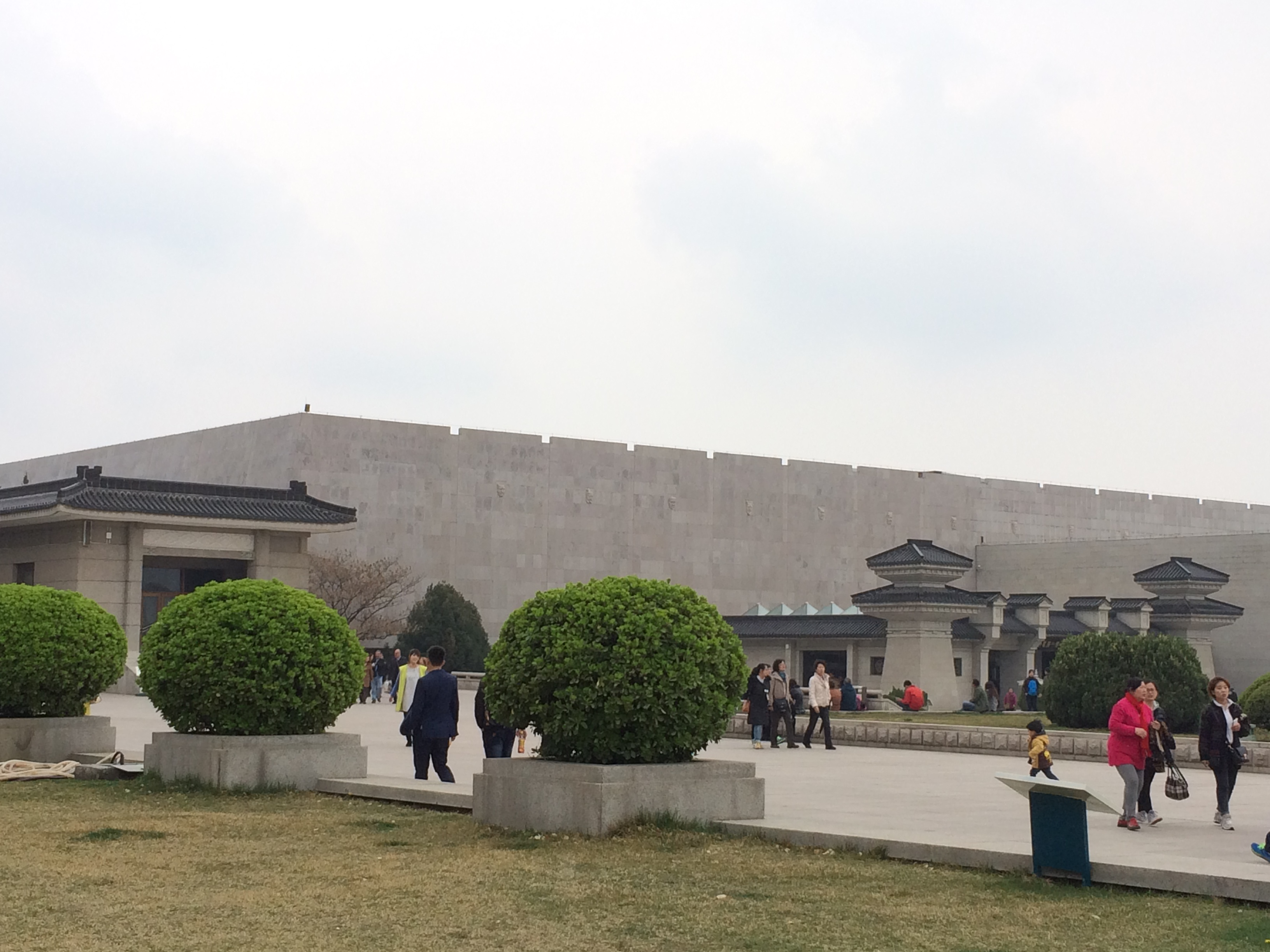
Terracotta Army Museum - The complex that currently houses the Terracotta Army excavation sites

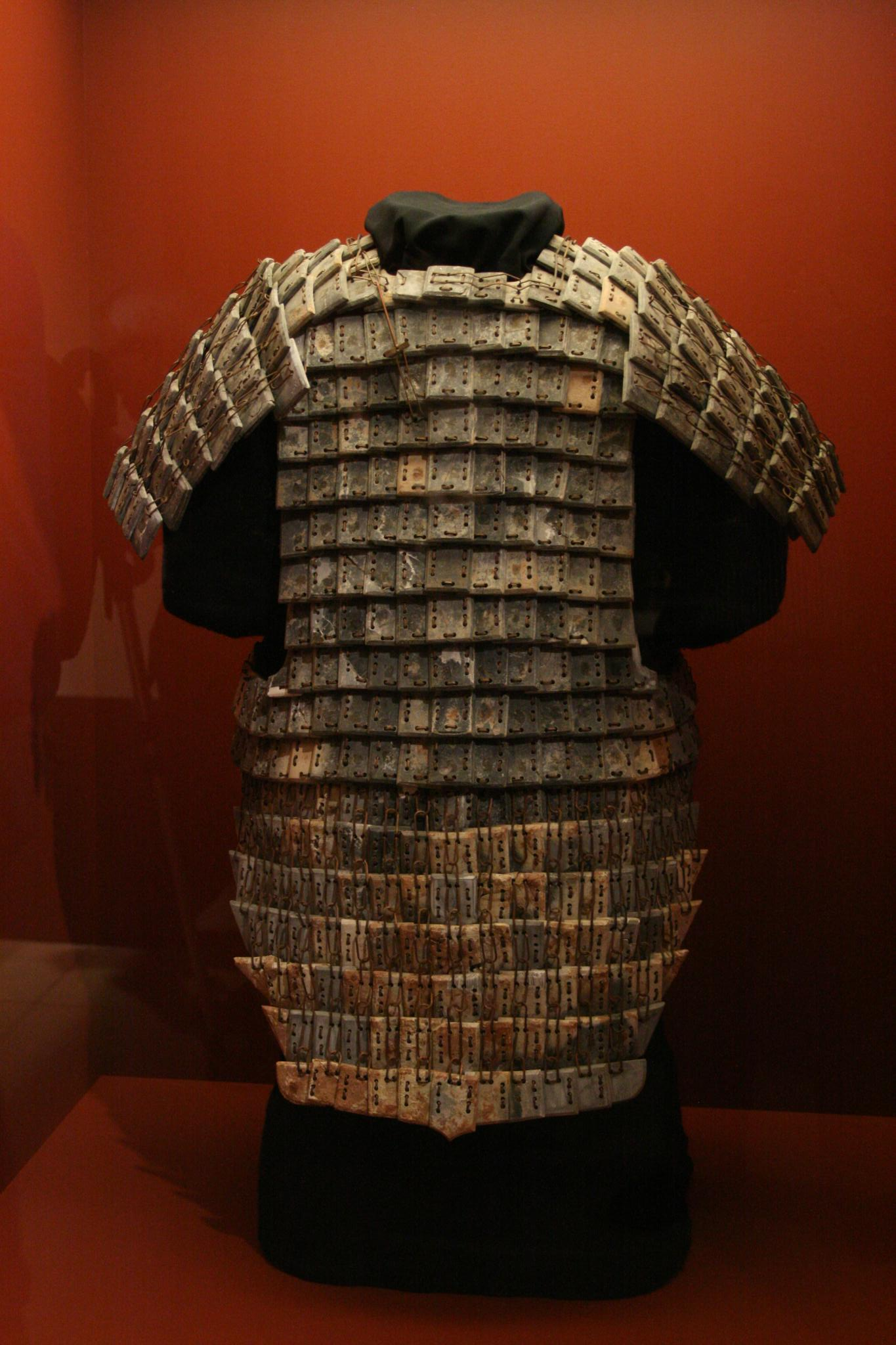
Recovered suit of armor from the Mausoleum site.

=== Reputation and assessment ===
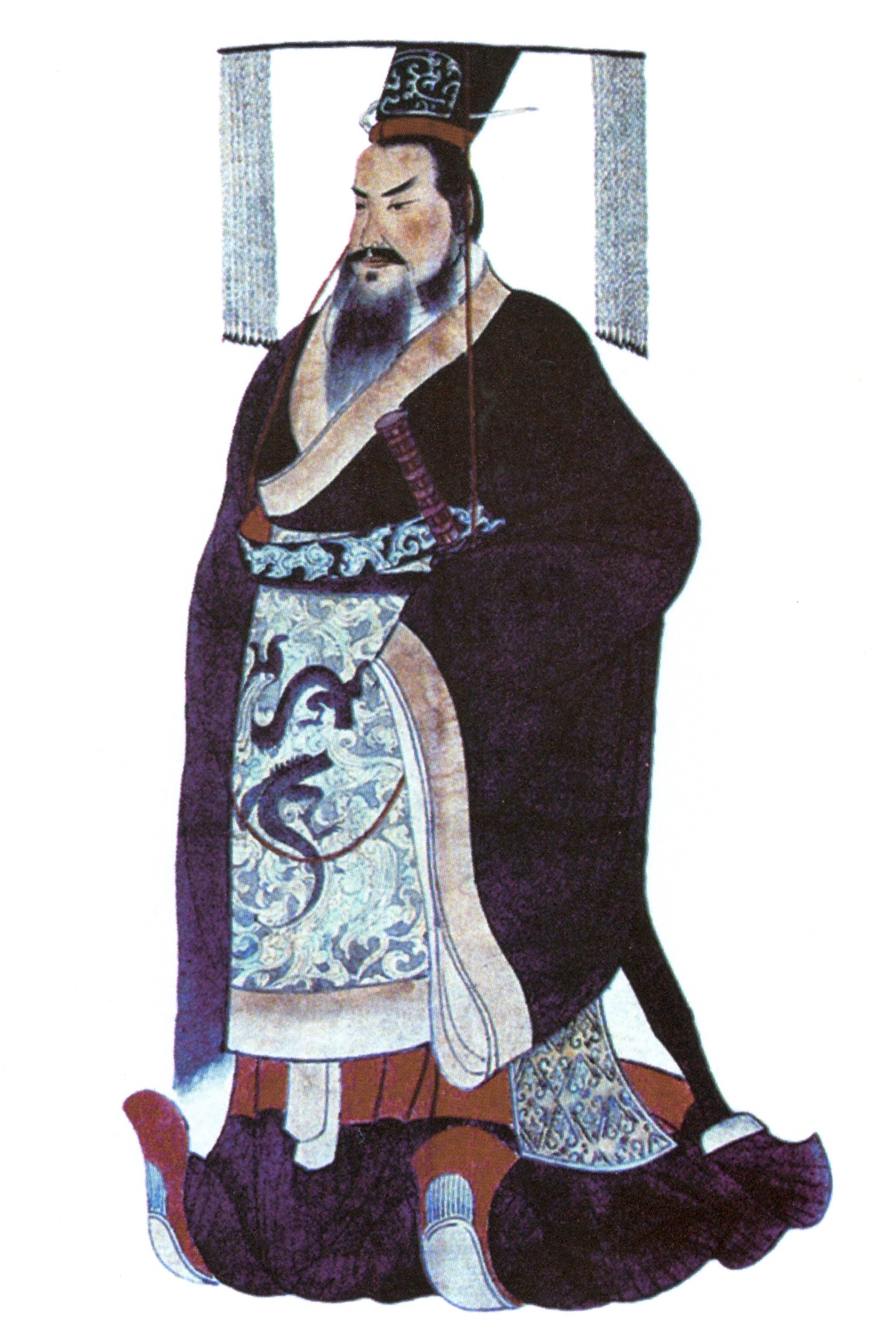
An imaginary depiction of Qin Shi Huang, painted during the late Qing dynasty

Traditional Chinese historiography almost always portrayed the Emperor as a brutal tyrant who had an obsessive fear of assassination. Ideological antipathy towards the Legalist State of Qin was established as early as 266 BC, when Confucian philosopher Xunzi disparaged it. Later Confucian historians condemned the emperor, alleging that he burned the classics and buried Confucian scholars alive. They eventually compiled a list of the Ten Crimes of Qin to highlight his tyrannical actions.

The famous Han poet and statesman Jia Yi concluded his essay The Faults of Qin (過秦論, Guò Qín Lùn) with what was to become the standard Confucian judgment of the reasons for Qin's collapse. Jia Yi's essay, admired as a masterpiece of rhetoric and reasoning, was copied into two great Han histories and has had a far-reaching influence on Chinese political thought as a classic illustration of Confucian theory. He attributed Qin's disintegration to its internal failures. Jia Yi wrote that:

Qin, from a tiny base, had become a great power, ruling the land and receiving homage from all quarters for a hundred odd years. Yet after they unified the land and secured themselves within the pass, a single common rustic could nevertheless challenge this empire... Why? Because the ruler lacked humaneness and rightness; because preserving power differs fundamentally from seizing power.

In the modern period, assessments began to emerge that differed from those of traditional historiography. The reassessment was spurred on by the weakness of China in the latter half of the 19th century and early 20th century. At that time, some began to regard Confucian traditions as an impediment to China's entry into the modern world, opening the way for changing perspectives.

At a time when foreign nations encroached upon Chinese territory, leading Kuomintang historian Xiao Yishan emphasized the role of Qin Shi Huang in repulsing the northern barbarians, particularly in the construction of the Great Wall.

Another historian, Ma Feibai (馬非百), published in 1941 a full-length revisionist biography of the First Emperor entitled Qín Shǐ Huángdì Zhuàn (秦始皇帝傳), calling him "one of the great heroes of Chinese history". Ma compared him with the contemporary leader Chiang Kai-shek and saw many parallels in the careers and policies of the two men, both of whom he admired. Chiang's Northern Expedition of the late 1920s, which directly preceded the new Nationalist government at Nanjing was compared to the unification brought about by Qin Shi Huang.

With the advent of the Chinese Communist Revolution and the establishment of a new, revolutionary regime in 1949, another re-evaluation of the First Emperor emerged as a Marxist critique. This new interpretation of Qin Shi Huang was generally a combination of traditional and modern views, but essentially critical. This is exemplified in the Complete History of China, which was compiled in September 1955 as an official survey of Chinese history. The work described the First Emperor's major steps toward unification and standardisation as corresponding to the interests of the ruling group and the merchant class, not of the nation or the people, and the subsequent fall of his dynasty as a manifestation of the class struggle. The perennial debate about the fall of the Qin dynasty was also explained in Marxist terms, the peasant rebellions being a revolt against oppression—a revolt which undermined the dynasty, but which was bound to fail because of a compromise with "landlord class elements".

On hearing he'd been compared to the First Emperor for his persecution of intellectuals, Mao Zedong reportedly boasted in 1958:

He buried 460 scholars alive; we have buried forty-six thousand scholars alive... You [intellectuals] revile us for being Qin Shi Huangs. You are wrong. We have surpassed Qin Shi Huang a hundredfold. When you berate us for imitating his despotism, we are happy to agree! Your mistake was that you did not say so enough.

However, Li Zhisui, then one of Mao's personal physicians, described Mao's admiration for Qin Shi Huang in a somewhat more moderate viewpoint in his memoirs The Private Life of Chairman Mao:

[Qin]... the man credited with building the Great Wall... was another of Mao's favorites and the emperor with whom he was most often compared. [Qin] had expanded China's territory and consolidated a multitude of small countries into a single state. He had introduced measures and weights. He had constructed roads. But the Chinese people hated him because he had executed the Confucian scholars and burned the classic books. But [Qin] killed the scholars, Mao argued, only because they got in the way of his efforts to unify China and build the Chinese Empire. And he only killed 260 Confucian scholars. Where was the great tragedy in that? One ought not, in looking at [Qin], exaggerate the trivial and ignore the great.

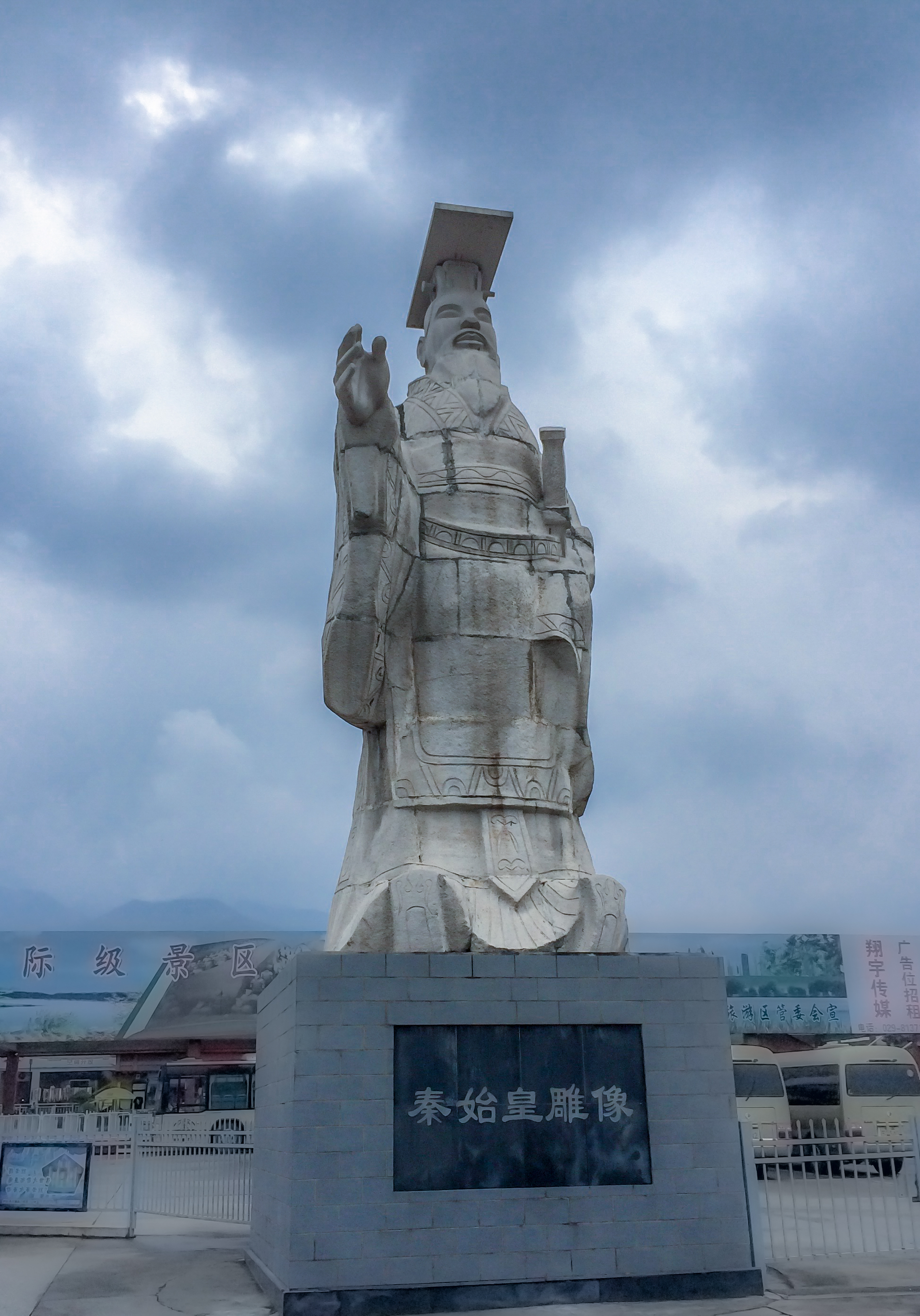
Statue of Qin Shi Huang in Xi'an

Since 1972, however, a radically different official view of Qin Shi Huang in accordance with Maoist thought has been given prominence throughout China. Hong Shidi's biography Qin Shi Huang initiated the re-evaluation. The work was published by the state press as a mass popular history, and it sold 1.85 million copies within two years. In the new era, Qin Shi Huang was seen as a far-sighted ruler who destroyed the forces of division and established the first unified, centralized state in Chinese history by rejecting the past. Personal attributes, such as his quest for immortality, so emphasized in traditional historiography, were scarcely mentioned. The new evaluations described approvingly how, in his time (an era of great political and social change), he had no compunctions against using violent methods to crush counter-revolutionaries, such as the "industrial and commercial slave owner" chancellor Lü Buwei. However, he was criticized for not being as thorough as he should have been, and as a result, after his death, hidden subversives under the leadership of the chief eunuch Zhao Gao were able to seize power and use it to restore the old feudal order.

To round out this re-evaluation, Luo Siding put forward a new interpretation of the precipitous collapse of the Qin dynasty in an article entitled "On the Class Struggle During the Period Between Qin and Han" in a 1974 issue of Red Flag, to replace the old explanation. The new theory claimed that the cause of the fall of Qin lay in the lack of thoroughness of Qin Shi Huang's "dictatorship over the reactionaries, even to the extent of permitting them to worm their way into organs of political authority and usurp important posts".

=== Depictions in popular media ===
- "The Wall and the Books" ("La muralla y los libros"), an acclaimed essay on Qin Shi Huang published by Argentine writer Jorge Luis Borges (1899–1986) in the 1952 collection Other Inquisitions (Otras Inquisiciones).
- The Emperor's Shadow (1996) – The film focuses on Qin Shi Huang's relationship with the musician Gao Jianli, a friend of the assassin Jing Ke.
- The Emperor and the Assassin (1999) – The film covers much of Ying Zheng's career, recalling his early experiences as a hostage and foreshadowing his dominance over China.
- Hero (2002) – The film stars Jet Li, a nameless assassin who plans an assassination attempt on the King of Qin (Chen Daoming). The film is a fictional re-imagining of the assassination attempt by Jing Ke on Qin Shi Huang.
- Rise of the Great Wall (1986) – a 63-episode Hong Kong TV series chronicling the events from the emperor's birth until his death. Tony Liu played Qin Shi Huang.
- A Step into the Past (2001) – a Hong Kong TVB production based on a science fiction novel by Huang Yi.
- Qin Shi Huang (2002) – a mainland Chinese TV semi-fictionalized series with Zhang Fengyi.
- Kingdom (2006) – a Japanese manga that provides a fictionalized account of the unification of China by Ying Zheng with Li Xin and all the people that contributed to the conquest of the six Warring States.
- Fate/Grand Order (2015), an online, free-to-play role-playing mobile game of the Fate franchise developed by Delightworks and published by Aniplex features Qin Shi Huang as a Ruler class servant.
- Civilization VI (2016), a turn-based strategy 4X video game developed by Firaxis Games and published by 2K features Qin Shi Huang as a playable leader.
- First Emperor: The Man Who Made China (2006) – a drama-documentary special about Qin Shi Huang. James Pax played the emperor. It was shown on Channel 4 in the United Kingdom in 2006.
- China's First Emperor (2008) – a special three-hour documentary by The History Channel. Xu Pengkai played Qin Shi Huang.
- The Mummy: Tomb of the Dragon Emperor (2008) – the third of The Mummy trilogy. In the film, after General Ming Guo is killed for touching sorceress Zi Yuan, she puts a curse on the Emperor Qin and his army. He is played by Jet Li.
- Qin Shi Huang is depicted in seventh volume of the manga Record of Ragnarok, fighting Hades. In the manga, he is depicted as a tall slender young man with a cloth covering his eye. He is also shown to be wearing traditional Chinese clothing.
- Qin Shi Huang features in the "Deadly Dynasties" episode of Horrible Histories with the song "Qin Leader", which is an educational parody of Omi's "Cheerleader".
- CCTV, Season 3 of Guojia Baozang – a collection of CCTV sponsored short historical stage dramas with Fu Dalong portraying Qin Shi huang.

== Bibliography ==
=== Early ===
- Sima Qian (c. 91 BC). Shiji
  - Sima, Qian (2007). Records of the Grand Historian: Qin dynasty. Translated by Dawson, Raymond. Columbia University Press]. ISBN 978-0-19-922634-4.
  - Sima, Qian (2006). William, Nienhauser (ed.). The Grand Scribe's Records V.1: The Hereditary Houses of Pre-Han China. Indiana University Press. ISBN 9780253340252.
  - Sima, Qian (1994). William, Nienhauser (ed.). The Grand Scribe's Records I: The Basic Annals of Pre-Han China. Indiana University Press. ISBN 9780253340214.
  - Sima, Qian (1993). Records of the Grand Historian: Qin Dynasty. Translated by Watson, Burton (3rd ed.). New York: Columbia University Press. ISBN 978-0231081696.

=== Modern ===
==== Books ====
- Barbieri-Low, Anthony J.; Yates, Robin D. S. (2015). Law, State, and Society in Early Imperial China. Sinica Leidensia. Vol. 1. Leiden: Brill. ISBN 978-90-04-30053-8.
- Bodde, Derk (1986). "The State and Empire of Ch'in". In Twitchett, Dennis; Loewe, Michael (eds.). The Cambridge History of China, Volume 1: The Ch'in and Han Empires, 221 BC–AD 220. Cambridge: Cambridge University Press. ISBN 978-0-521-24327-8.
- Clements, Jonathan (2006). The First Emperor of China. Cheltenham: Sutton. ISBN 978-0-7509-3960-7.
- Cotterell, Arthur (1981). The First Emperor of China: The Greatest Archeological Find of Our Time. New York: Holt, Rinehart, & Winston. ISBN 978-0-03-059889-0.
- Guisso, R. W. L.; Pagani, Catherine; Miller, David (1989). The First Emperor of China. New York: Birch Lane. ISBN 978-1-55972-016-8.
- Lewis, Mark Edward (2007). The Early Chinese Empires: Qin and Han. Cambridge, MA: Harvard University Press. ISBN 978-0-674-02477-9.
- Loewe, Michael (2000). A Biographical Dictionary of the Qin, Former Han and Xin Periods (221 BC - AD 24). Leiden: Brill. ISBN 978-90-04-10364-1.
- Loewe, Michael (2004). The Men Who Governed Han China: Companion to a Biographical Dictionary of the Qin, Former Han and Xin Periods. Leiden: Brill. ISBN 978-90-04-13845-2.
- Paludan, Ann (1998). Chronicle of the Chinese Emperors: The Reign-by-Reign Record of the Rulers of Imperial China. London: Thames & Hudson. ISBN 978-0-500-05090-3.
- Pines, Yuri (2009). Envisioning Eternal Empire. University of Hawaii Press. ISBN 978-0-8248-3275-9.
- Portal, Jane (2007). The First Emperor, China's Terracotta Army. London: British Museum Press. ISBN 978-1-932543-26-1.
- Vervoorn, Aat Emile (1990). "Chronology of Dynasties and Reign Periods". Men of the Cliffs and Caves: The Development of the Chinese Eremitic Tradition to the End of the Han Dynasty. Hong Kong: Chinese University Press. pp. 311–316. ISBN 978-962-201-415-2.
- Wilkinson, Endymion (2018). Chinese History: A New Manual (5th ed.). Cambridge, MA: Harvard University Asia Center. ISBN 978-0-9988883-0-9.

==== Articles ====
- Dull, Jack L. (July 1983). "Anti-Qin Rebels: No Peasant Leaders Here". Modern China. 9 (3): 285–318. doi:10.1177/009770048300900302. JSTOR 188992. S2CID 143585546.
- Müller, Claudius Cornelius (29 May 2021). "Qin Shi Huang". Encyclopædia Britannica. Chicago.
- Sanft, Charles (2008). "Progress and Publicity in Early China: Qin Shihuang, Ritual, and Common Knowledge". Journal of Ritual Studies. 22 (1): 21–37. JSTOR 44368779.
- Sørensen, Ærenlund (2010). "How the First Emperor Unified the Minds of Contemporary Historians: The Inadequate Source Criticism in Modern Historical Works about the Chinese Bronze Age". Monumenta Serica. 58: 1–30. doi:10.1179/mon.2010.58.1.001. JSTOR 41417876. S2CID 152767331.

First Emperor of Qin House of Ying Born: 260 BC Died: 210 BC
Regnal titles
Preceded by King Zhuangxiang	King of Qin; 246–221 BC with Lü Buwei (246–235 BC)	Recreated Title next held by Qin San Shi
New title	Emperor of China; Qin; 221–210 BC	Succeeded by Qin Er Shi
Vacant Qin's wars of unification Title last held by King Nan of Zhou as King of China	Monarchs of China as Emperor of China; Qin; 221–210 BC	Succeeded by Qin Er Shi
