= Jing Ke =

Ancient Chinese assassin (died 227 BCE)

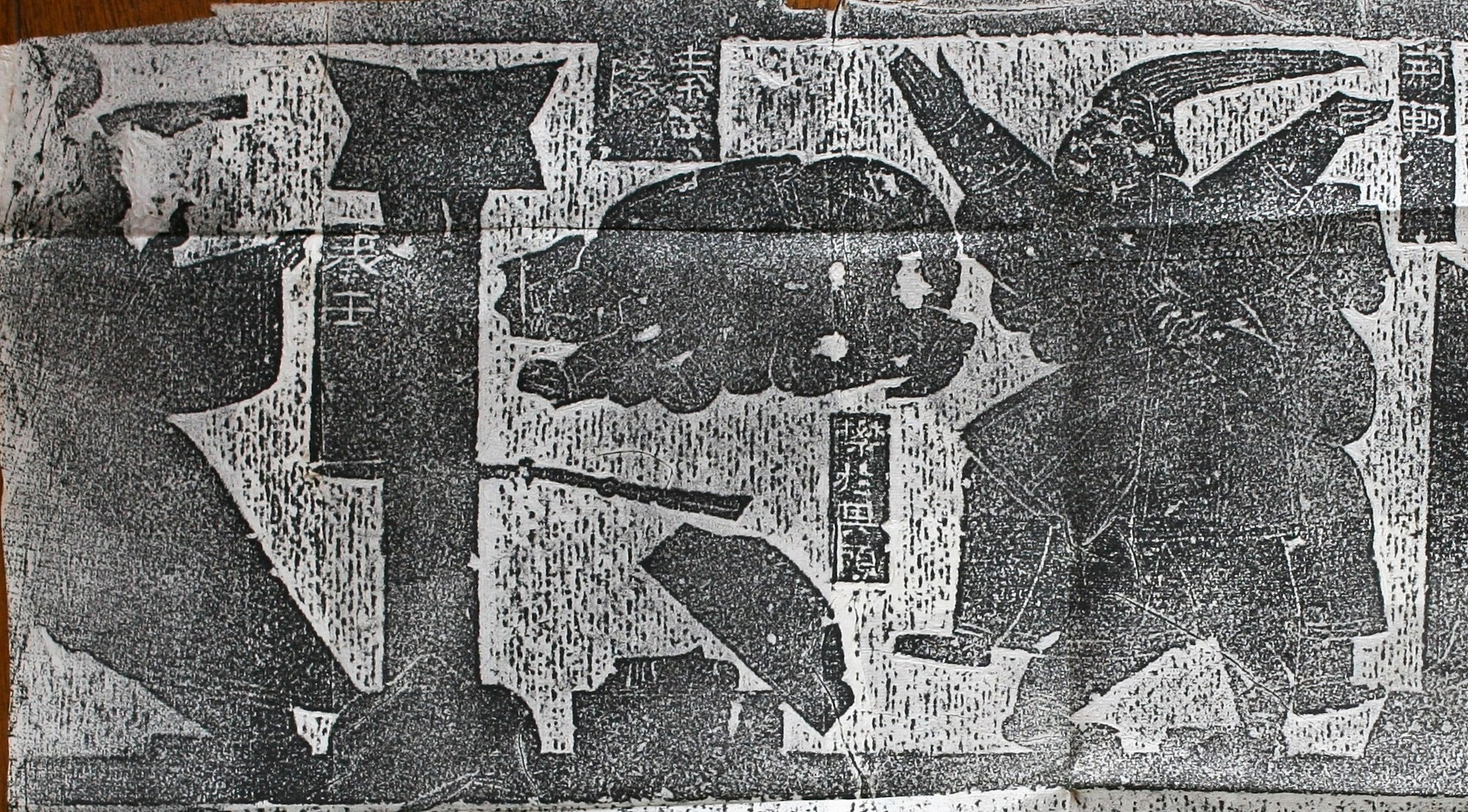
- The Wu Family Shrines mural shows Jing Ke's assassination attempt. The King of Qin is on the left, Qin Wuyang is kneeling in the middle, and Jing Ke, on the right, has been seized. In the middle is the dagger, sticking out of the column, and the opened box with the head inside.
- Traditional Chinese: 荊軻
- Simplified Chinese: 荆轲
Transcriptions
Standard Mandarin
- Hanyu Pinyin: Jīng Kē
- Wade–Giles: Ching K'o
- IPA: [tɕíŋ kʰɤ́]
Yue: Cantonese
- Jyutping: ging1 o1
Middle Chinese
- Middle Chinese: kiæŋ kʰɑ
Old Chinese
- Zhengzhang: *keŋ kʰaːl

Jing Ke (died 227 BC) was a youxia during the late Warring States period of Ancient China. As a retainer of Crown Prince Dan of the Yan state, Jing Ke was infamous for his failed assassination attempt on King Zheng of the Qin state, who later became Qin Shi Huang, the first emperor of the Qin dynasty and the first unified sovereign in Chinese history. Jing Ke's story is told in the chapter titled Biographies of Assassins (刺客列傳) in Sima Qian's Records of the Grand Historian.

== Background ==
In 230 BC, the Qin state began conquering other states as part of King Zheng's ambition to unify the country. The Qin army, having already achieved absolute military supremacy over the other states since 260 BC, first successfully annihilated the state of Han, the weakest of the Seven Warring States. Two years later, the once-formidable Zhao state was also conquered in 228 BC.

Zhao's northeastern neighbor, the Yan state was next in line to be threatened by Qin expansion. In exchange for peace, King Xi of Yan had earlier forced his son Crown Prince Dan to be held a diplomatic hostage in the Qin, but Prince Dan returned knowing that Qin was far stronger than Yan and would attack it sooner or later.

Jing Ke originally came from the minor Wei state. He was of the clan name Qing (庆氏) of the ancestral name Jiang (姜姓) and a distant descendant of Wukui of Qi, had good education and was proficient in the art of the sword. His homeland of Wei was annexed by Qin in 239 BC, and Jing Ke fled to Yan. A youxia named Tian Guang (田光) first introduced him to Prince Dan. There Jing Ke accepted the hospitality of Prince Dan, who, as a last resort, decided to send an assassin against the King of Qin. The plan involved either kidnapping the king and forcing him to release the territories from his control; or failing this, killing him. The expectation in either case was that Qin would be left disorganized, enabling the other remaining major states to unite against its conquest.

== Assassination plot ==
=== Planning ===
In 228 BC, the Qin army was already at the Zhao capital of Handan, and was waiting to approach the state of Yan. At the time, Dukang (督亢, in present-day counties of Zhuozhou, Gaobeidian and Gu'an of Hebei province) was the first region of the Yan state that the Qin wanted to annex due to the region's fertile farmlands.

The assassination plan plotted by Prince Dan was to have Jing Ke disguised as a nobleman ambassador visiting Qin to beg for mercy and surrender the map of Dukang (and thus also the administrative rights of the region) as gift for peace. At the time, a Qin general Fan Yuqi (identified as Huan Yi by Yang Kuan) had lost favor with the Qin court and fled to Yan in exile, and the Qin state wanted him for treason and had put a bounty of 1,000 gold pieces for his head. Jing Ke went to Fan Yuqi to personally discuss the assassination plan. Fan Yuqi, who wanted revenge against Qin, believed that the plan would work, and agreed to commit suicide so that his severed head could be collected as a more sincere gift to Qin, which would give Jing Ke the opportunity to get closer to King Zheng of Qin.

Prince Dan then obtained the sharpest possible dagger, refined it with poison, and gave it to Jing Ke. To accompany him, Prince Dan assigned Qin Wuyang, a hitman who was known to have successfully committed murder at the age of 13, as Jing Ke's assistant.

In 227 BC, Prince Dan and other guests wore white clothing and white hats at the Yi River (易水) to send off the pair of assassins. Jing Ke reportedly sang a song "The wind howls, and the waters of the River Yi are cold. When a hero sets out, he never returns!" (風蕭蕭兮易水寒，壯士一去兮不復還) when his friend Gao Jianli came to farewell him.

=== The attempt ===
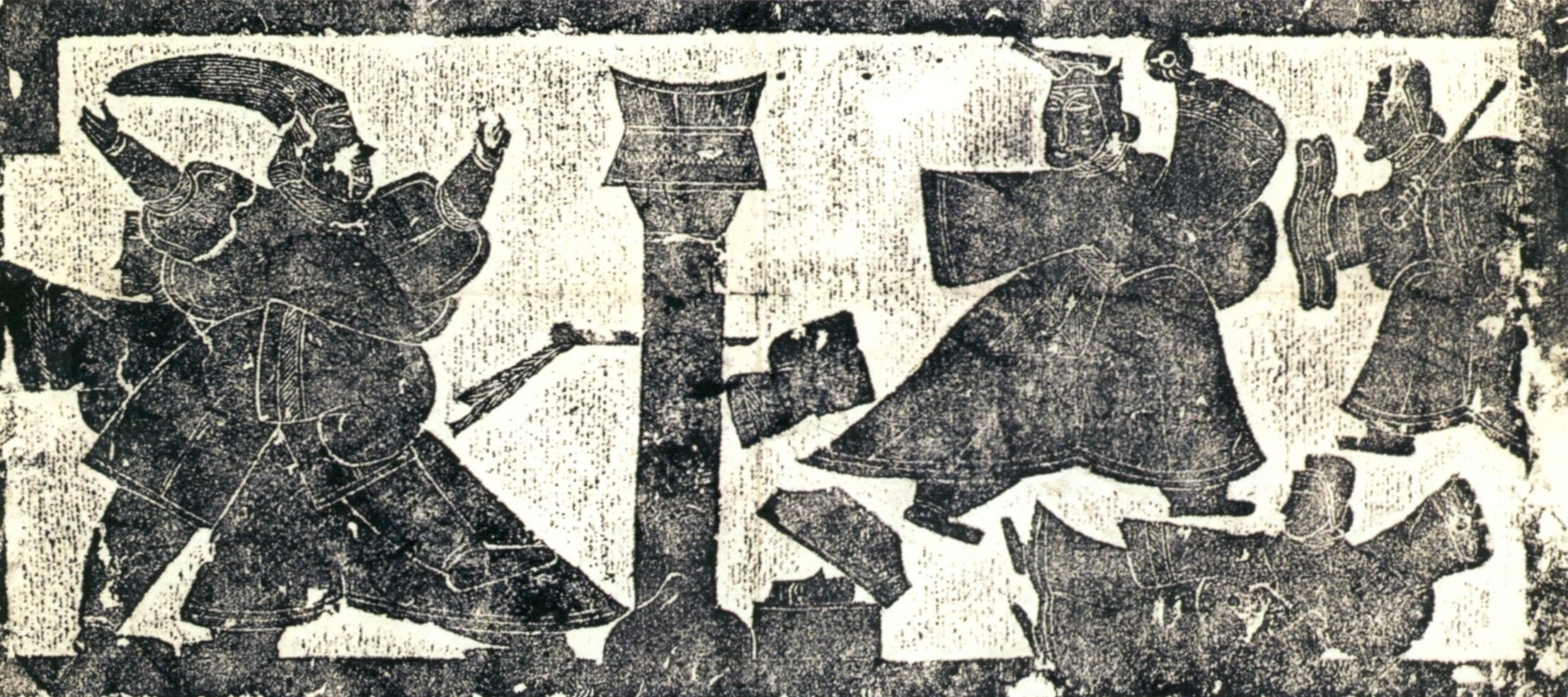
Jing Ke's assassination attempt on Qin Shi Huang; Jing Ke (left) is held by one of Qin Shi Huang's physicians (left, background). The dagger used in the assassination attempt is seen stuck in the pillar. Qin Shi Huang (right) is seen holding an imperial jade disc. One of his soldiers (far right) rushes to save his emperor. Stone rubbing; 3rd century, Eastern Han

King Zheng of Qin received the message of Yan emissaries presenting gifts, and was willing to receive them at the royal palace in the Qin capital Xianyang. Concealing the dagger inside the map scroll, Jing Ke and Qin Wuyang greeted King Zheng as Yan ambassadors. Qin Wuyang reportedly became so nervous that he acted almost paralyzed when entering the palace. Jing Ke, who remained calm, managed the excuse that his partner had never set eyes on the grace of the Son of Heaven. Other sources suggest Jing Ke described Qin Wuyang as a rural boy who had never seen the world and was suffering a cultural shock. The panicked Qin Wuyang was then barred from moving up the palace, and Jing Ke was ordered to approach King Zheng alone to present the map.

Jing Ke walked up to King Zheng's throne and politely presented the map scroll on the table. When the King Zheng unrolled the map, Jing Ke immediately seized the revealed dagger, grabbed the king's sleeve and attacked him, who somehow managed to back away from the initial thrust by tearing off the sleeve in the process. While King Zheng leapt to his feet and fled from the attacker, he desperately attempted to draw his own longsword hanging on the belt, but was unable to do so while running as it was a very long ceremonial sword. None of the other Qin officials within the vicinity were armed and able to stop Jing Ke, and the royal guards were all stationed outside the palace hall and were unable to immediately reach the scene. In the confusion Jing Ke began to close in on the king, who struggled to get away from the assassin by circling behind a pillar.

Seeing the king in grave danger, a royal physician named Xia Wuju (夏無且) grabbed his medicine bag and hurled it at Jing Ke, which slowed down the assassin just enough to allow King Zheng to recover some distance. Reminded by cries from other officials, King Zheng managed to shift his longsword behind his back and successfully unsheathe it. Now armed with a weapon, King Zheng turned back to confront Jing Ke and struck him in the thigh, effectively immobilizing him. The injured Jing Ke threw his dagger at King Zheng in desperation, but missed. The king then proceeded to stab Jing Ke eight more times, mortally wounding him. Knowing it was hopelessly over, the dying Jing Ke sat with his legs stretched forward and apart (a posture then considered very vulgar and rude), and used the last of his strength to taunt King Zheng with abuses. At this point, the palace guards had arrived at the scene to finish off both Jing Ke and the fleeing Qin Wuyang.

It was recorded that right after the incident, King Zheng sat on the throne holding his sword catatonically for a short while before recovering from the mental shock, and thanked and rewarded the physician Xia Wuju for attempting to stop the assassin.

== Aftermath ==
After Jing Ke's assassination attempt, the Qin army general Wang Jian was sent against the Yan state. In 226 BC, Prince Dan sent his army to fight at Ji (薊), but were soon defeated. In an effort to try to appease the King of Qin, King Xi of Yan put his son to death; however, the Yan were annexed and destroyed nonetheless.

== In popular culture ==
- The 1996 Chinese historical film The Emperor's Shadow, starring Jiang Wen, Ge You and Xu Qing, is based on aftermath of Jing Ke's assassination attempt.
- The Chinese film The Emperor and the Assassin (1999), starring Zhang Fengyu, Li Xuejian and Gong Li, is based on the assassination.
- The 2002 Chinese epic Hero is a highly fictionalized take on Jing Ke's attempted assassination.
- Nobel laureate Mo Yan wrote a play in 2003, entitled "Our Jing Ke" (我们的荆轲), which retells the story of Jing Ke's failed assassination attempt. The play premiered in August 2011 in Beijing by Beijing People's Art Theatre (BPAT). The play won the highest drama award in China in 2012.

== See also ==
- Gao Jianli, Jing Ke's close friend, who later attempted to assassinate Qin Shi Huang
- Zhang Liang, a Han aristocrat who also attempted to assassinate Qin Shi Huang in 218 BC.
