= Crown Prince Dan =

- Crown Prince of State of Yan
- Born: 姬丹
- Died: 226 BC
- Father: Xi, King of Yan

Crown Prince Dan (Chinese: 太子丹; pinyin: Tàizǐ Dān) was a crown prince of the State of Yan during the Warring States period of ancient China. He was also called Yan Dan (Chinese: 燕丹; pinyin: Yān Dān).

He lived in the State of Qin as a hostage, but returned to Yan in 232 BC. He sent Jing Ke to assassinate King Zheng of Qin, who later assumed the title Qin Shi Huang and became the first Emperor of China, in the wake of Jing's failure. King Xi of Yan, Dan's father and the last king of Yan, ordered the execution of Dan to please Qin after the Yan capital Ji fell to Qin. The invasion of Qin was halted for few years, during which time the states of Wei and Chu were conquered; meanwhile, King Xi of Yan moved to the Liaodong Commandery.

The state of Yan was conquered in 222 BC and King Xi was captured.

All except King Xi were featured in the Chinese period epic The Emperor and the Assassin. Prince Dan is also featured in the 2004 TV series Assassinator Jing Ke.
