= A Step into the Past =

2001 Hong Kong TV series

- Official poster

Chinese name
- Traditional Chinese: 尋秦記
- Simplified Chinese: 寻秦记
Transcriptions
Standard Mandarin
- Hanyu Pinyin: Xún Qín Jì
Yue: Cantonese
- Jyutping: Cam4 Ceon4 Gei3
- Genre: Historical fiction Wuxia; Science fiction
- Based on: Xun Qin Ji by Wong Yik
- Screenplay by: Wong Kwok-fai; Tong Kin-ping; Lau Choi-wun; Cheung Siu-fong; Ho Kwan-ngo
- Directed by: Mun Wai-hung; Shek Ming-chuen; Lau Shun-on; Lam Tze-yan; Ng Kam-yuen
- Starring: Louis Koo; Kwong Wa; Jessica Hsuan; Sonija Kwok; Raymond Lam; Joyce Tang; Michelle Saram; Waise Lee; Eileen Yeow; Sidney Yim; Kwok Fung
- Theme music composer: Chiu Tsang-hei
- Opening theme: Tin Ming Jui Ko (天命最高) by Louis Koo
- Ending theme: Ngo Yuen Oi (我願愛) by Louis Koo
- Country of origin: Hong Kong
- Original language: Cantonese
- No. of episodes: 40

Production
- Producer: Chong Wai-kin
- Production locations: Hong Kong; Hengdian World Studios
- Editors: Wong Kwok-fai; Tong Kin-ping
- Camera setup: Multi camera
- Running time: 45 minutes per episode
- Production company: TVB

Original release
- Network: TVB Jade
- Release: 15 October – 7 December 2001

Related
- Back to the Past (2025)

A Step into the Past is a 2001 Hong Kong television series produced by TVB and based on Huang Yi's novel of the same Chinese title. The series tells the story of a 21st-century Hong Kong VIPPU Inspector who travels back in time to the Warring States period of ancient China. He is involved in a number of important historical events that lead to the first unification of China under the Qin dynasty. The series' first original broadcast ran from 15 October to 7 December 2001 on the TVB Jade network in Hong Kong.

A film sequel to the series, titled Back to the Past was theatrically released on 31 December 2025.

== Plot ==
=== 21st century Hong Kong ===
Hong Siu-lung is a 21st-century VIPPU Inspector in Hong Kong. In the first episode, Hong and his colleagues stand guard at an exhibition of the First Emperor's Terracotta Army. One of Hong's colleagues notices that one of the terracotta warriors bears a striking resemblance to Hong. Moments later, wealthy businessman Lee Siu-chiu is attacked and held hostage at the museum by a madman who had suffered losses in the stock market. Hong rescues Lee and defuses the crisis.

Hong is unhappy despite his success in his career. He has just broken up with his girlfriend, Chun Ching, after a seven-year-long relationship. She insisted that they be wed, but he preferred to continue their relationship without a proper marriage. Chun married another man, and Hong becomes depressed.

=== Time travelling ===
Impressed with Hong's rescue attempt, Lee Siu-chiu and Doctor Wu Yau recruit him for a secret time-travelling experiment. Hong agrees to help them in exchange for an opportunity to travel back in time to salvage his failed relationship with Chun Ching. He is tasked to travel back more than two thousand years to the Qin dynasty, half an hour prior to the coronation of Ying Ching in 247 BC, and document the event with a digital camera before a swift departure. However, a critical error occurs during the traveling stage and Hong is sent further back in time three years earlier than originally planned. He is now trapped in the Zhao state of the Warring States period in 250 BC.

In order to return to the future, Hong has to make an arduous journey across thousands of miles in ancient China to activate a device at a specific location and time. He was warned that making even a slight change in the grand scheme of events will trigger a chain reaction of catastrophes that will alter history.

=== Warring states period ===
Hong enjoys a series of adventures in history. His knowledge of the 21st century, intelligence and experience as an elite special agent, as well as his prowess in martial arts, enables him to make a strong stand in history. He enters the service of various lords and nobles, and becomes a valuable ally to them. Concurrently, he becomes involved in romantic relationships with four women. The first, Sin-yau, is a wandering female assassin and the first person he meets after travelling back in time. The second, Wu Ting-fong, is the beautiful but spoiled daughter of a wealthy noble. The third is a pretty female scholar named Kam Ching, who resembles his 21st century girlfriend Chun Ching in appearance and shares a similar name (completely homophonic in Standard Mandarin). The last is Princess Chiu Sin, the daughter of the king of Zhao, who dies in a tragic incident later. He also befriends the king's sister, Chiu Nga and her son Chiu Poon. Meanwhile, he foils the evil plans of Chiu Muk, a secret agent from the Chu state, and becomes Chiu's enemy. Chiu Muk's henchman Lin Chun also sees Hong as his greatest rival.

=== Destiny ===
Ying sees Hong as a valuable ally in his future endeavors and wants to retain him as an adviser. However, Hong begins to feel regret when he sees the evil creation of his efforts, fulfilling the predestination paradox. He is aware that he is not destined to leave his mark in history and refuses to stay in the imperial court. He leaves with Wu Ting-Fong and Kam Ching, who are both happily married to him at last. Ying sends his troops to pursue Hong and eventually decides to exile Hong and decrees that the name "Hong Siu-lung" shall henceforth be purged from history. All books and historical records pertaining to Hong are ordered to be destroyed, which leads to Qin Shihuang's notorious practice of the burning of books and burying of scholars.

Hong and his family find paradise in the plains far from the urban regions. Hong and Wu Ting-Fong have a son. In the final moments of the last episode, Hong's son tells him he wants to change his name from Bowie to Hong Yu, a man who historically become a prominent military general who overthrew the Qin dynasty but has a tragic end as he became a dictator. Hong then exclaims in English "Shit!"

== Cast ==
Note: Character names are in Cantonese romanisation.

=== Main characters ===
- Louis Koo as Hong Siu-lung (Chinese: 項少龍; pinyin: Xiàng Shàolóng), the protagonist of the story. Born in 1975, Hong was orphaned at the age of three and spent most of his childhood in foster care. Sociable, diligent, and smart, Hong graduates to VIPPU Inspector after only one year of training. When his girlfriend of seven years breaks up with him, Hong agrees to a time travelling project organised by Lee Siu-chiu on the condition that he will see his girlfriend again when he returns.
- Raymond Lam as Chiu Poon / Ying Ching (Chinese: 趙盤 / 嬴政; pinyin: Zhào Pán / Yíng Zhèng), the son of Princess Chiu Nga and General Zhao Kuo. He is despised by other nobles due to his mother's promiscuous reputation. After Hong rescues Lady Chu from the Zhao state, Chu mistakes Chiu as her deceased son, Ying Ching. Through Hong's coercion, also compounded by his personal lust for power and vengeance, Chiu becomes the crown prince of Qin and ascends to the throne, subsequently becoming the First Qin Emperor, the First Emperor of a unified China.
- Kwong Wa as Lin Chun / Lo Oi (Chinese: 連晉 / 嫪毐; pinyin: Lián Jìn / Lào Ǎi), a swordsman who used to serve Chiu Muk. He is abandoned by Chiu after Hong injures his right arm in a duel. During his banishment, Lin meets Lo Oi, a left-handed swordsman. After convincing Lo to teach him left-handed swordplay, he kills Lo and takes his identity.
- Sonija Kwok as Chun Ching / Kam Ching (Chinese: 秦青 / 琴清; pinyin: Qín Qīng / Qín Qīng). Chun Ching was Hong's girlfriend of seven years, but broke up with him after he reneged on the wedding promise. Hong agrees to participate in a time-travelling project after he is assured that Chun Ching will return to him. After Hong is transported to two thousand years back, he meets Kam Ching, a female scholar who resembles Chun Ching in appearance, and they develop a romantic relationship.
- Jessica Hsuan as Wu Ting-fong (Chinese: 烏廷芳; pinyin: Wū Tíngfāng), the impulsive and spoiled daughter of the Qin loyalist Wu Ying-yuen. Although disgusted by Hong's flirtatious nature, she gradually becomes jealous of her own accord when she sees him with other maidens. Nonetheless, Wu develops a close friendship with Princess Chiu Sin and often visits her.
- Joyce Tang as Sin-yau (Chinese: 善柔; pinyin: Shànróu), a female assassin. She was an orphan. She becomes the apprentice of Mohist practitioner Cho Chau-to, also becoming an assassin who kills people for money. She is the first person Hong meets after he is transported back in time.
- Michelle Saram as Princess Chiu Sin (Chinese: 趙倩; pinyin: Zhào Qiàn), the daughter of King Hao-sing of Zhao. She develops feelings for Hong after he "rescues" her from the palace. She is also Hong's first love after he returns in time.
- Waise Lee as Chiu Muk (Chinese: 趙穆; pinyin: Zhào Mù), a secret agent who works for the Chu state as a spy in Zhao.
- Shirley Yim as Chiu Nga (Chinese: 趙雅; pinyin: Zhào Yǎ), the younger sister of the king of Zhao. She is Chiu Poon's mother and a close friend of Hong Siu-lung.

=== Supporting characters ===
- Eileen Yeow as Lady Chu (Chiu)
- Kwok Fung as Lui But-wai
- Power Chan as Lee See
- Derek Kok as Wong Chin
- Wong Man-piu as Tang Yik (滕翼)
- Lau Ka-long as Ying Jun {荊俊}
- Sherming Yiu as Lui Leung-yung (呂娘蓉)
- Yu Tze-ming as Chau Hin
- Wong Wai as Wu Ying-yuen (烏應元)
- Timothy Siu as Wu Ting-wai (烏廷威)
- Jimmy Au as To Fong (陶方)
- Kwok Tak-shun as Luk Kung (鹿公)
- Wong Wai-leung as Chiu Ko
- Lee Lung-kei as King Chong-sheung
- Andy Tai as Lord Yeung Chuen
- Lee Hoi-sang as Mung Ngo
- Chow Yeung as Prince Sing-kiu
- Peter Lai as King Hao-sing
- Lau Wing Kin as Chiu Tak (趙德)
- Bond Chan as Chiu Ka (趙嘉)
- Joyce Koi as Lord Lung-yeung
- Savio Tsang as Lord Suen-ling
- Ricky Wong as Hiu Ngai-mau
- Chan Ka-yee as Lady Ping-yuen (平原夫人)
- Raven Po as Crown Prince of Wei (魏太子)
- Gordon Liu as Cho Chau-dou (曹秋道)
- Steve Lee as Yim Ping (嚴平)
- Chan Wing-chun as Lo Oi
- Russell Cheung as the fake Ying Ching
- Kenneth Ma as Kam Ching's late husband
- Ng Yik-him as Hon Fei
- Law Ho-kai as Lee Yuen
- Yeung Ka-lok as Hon Yin (韓闖)
- Chan Tik-hak as Uncle Mute (啞大叔)
- Lam King-kong as Ah Keung (潺仔強) (episode 1)
- Chor Yuen as Officer Wong (王Sir) (episode 1)
- Mak Cheung-ching as madman Mak Wai-gin (麥偉健) (episode 1)
- John Tang as Lee Siu-chiu (李小超) (episode 1)
- Liu Kai-chi as Wu Yau (烏有) (episode 1)
- Yuen Wah as Yuen Chung (元宗) (episode 2–3)
- Cheung Lui as bandit Fui-wu (灰鬍) (episode 3)
- Tan Kuen-fai as bandit Coeng-mou (長毛) (episode 3)
- Lam Yuen-ying as bandit Dyun-mou (短毛) (episode 3)
- Wong Kun-sun as mountain bandit (山賊) (episode 3)
- Chow Chung as old man Gaa-ming (家明) (episode 2)
- Ha Ping as old woman Jyun-gwan (婉君) (episode 2)
- Wong He as the drummer (敲鑼人) (episode 6)
- Lee Chun-wai as Hong Yu (episode 40)

== Production and reception ==
This was the last television drama that Louis Koo acted in, as he had decided to concentrate on his film career. He has since worked on films such as Election and its sequel.

Raymond Lam, in his first major role, was highly praised for his breakthrough performance as Ying Ching, and rose to fame quickly. He has starred in numerous leading roles ever since.

While filming in Zhuozhou, Hebei, Jessica Hsuan was stricken with cholera, causing her to enter a local hospital. She remained in bed for over a month until she was able to leave and start filming again. This caused Hsuan's character to be absent for a while in the series. During her hospital stay, many of her co-stars, including Koo, visited her regularly.

After its 2005 midnight re-run, TVB decided to release the complete series on DVD and VCD for the first time on November 18 in the same year. It also became the second TVB drama to be released on DVD after War and Beauty, and the first to receive a non-limited release.

== Film adaptation ==
In May 2015, Koo's film production studio One Cool Film Productions (天下一電影製作有限公司) announced that it has obtained the rights to adapt the series into a full-length feature film. Koo, who will also produce the film, confirmed that he will reprise his role as Hong Siu-lung. In March 2018, One Cool Film Productions (天下一電影製作有限公司) confirmed that it has cast Lam and Hsuan to reprise their roles as Ying Ching and Wu Ting-fong, respectively. Jack Lai was hired to direct, and the film title was announced to be Back to the Past. A year later in March 2019, Back to the Past held its first press conference, also announcing that Kwok, Tang, and Saram will be returning, though it was not specified if they will be reprising their original roles. Ng Yuen-fai will co-direct alongside Lai. The film will be set 19 years after the events of the original television series.

== See also ==
- The King of Yesterday and Tomorrow
