= The King's Woman =

Chinese television series

- Genre: Historical fiction Wuxia; Romance
- Based on: The Legend of Qin: Li Ji Story by Wen Shiren
- Written by: Chen Huiru; Zhu Xianzhong
- Directed by: Liu Xin
- Starring: Dilraba Dilmurat; Vin Zhang; Li Tai; Liu Chang; Zhang Xuan
- Country of origin: China
- Original language: Mandarin
- No. of episodes: 48

Production
- Production companies: Beijing HualuBaina Film & TV; Zhong He Media; Beijing Hua'er Tai He

Original release
- Network: Zhejiang TV
- Release: 14 August – 4 October 2017

The King's Woman (Chinese: 秦时丽人明月心) is a 2017 Chinese television series starring Dilraba Dilmurat and Vin Zhang. It is adapted from the novel The Legend of Qin: Li Ji Story (秦时明月之丽姬传). The series aired on Zhejiang TV every Monday to Wednesday, from 14 August to 4 October 2017.

== Synopsis ==
Gongsun Li is the granddaughter and disciple of military commander Gongsun Yu. When she was young, she met and rescued Ying Zheng, who then fell in love with her at first sight. When the Qin troops were attacked, Gongsun Li's childhood lover, Jing Ke was poisoned while protecting her. In order to attain the antidote for Jing Ke, Gongsun Li agreed to marry Ying Zheng.

However, she found out that she was already pregnant with Jing Ke's child. Ying Zheng decides to hide the truth for Gongsun Li, treating the child, Tianming, as his own. Gongsun Li was deeply touched by Ying Zheng's actions. Simultaneously, Han Shen (Sun Li and Jing Ke's senior) entered the palace to save her and stayed on in the palace as an imperial guard

== Cast ==
=== Main ===
- Dilraba Dilmurat as Gongsun Li / Li'er
  - Huangyang Tiantian as young Gongsun Li
  - A kind and caring woman who was in love with Jing Ke. After he was poisoned, she gives herself up to the King in order to pay for the cure. She soon finds herself falling in love with Ying Zheng and willing to do anything for him. She tends to put others before herself and does not care if she is hurt. She holds the affection of Jing Ke, Ying Zheng, and Han Shen. She has a son, Tianming with Jing Ke.
  - "Concubine Li" (丽良人), later "Madam Li" (丽夫人)
- Vin Zhang as Ying Zheng
  - Dongli Wuyou as young Ying Zheng
  - The King of Qin and later Emperor of Qin who plans to unite China. As a child, he fell in love with Gongsun Li, one of the first people to show him compassion. Years later, he runs into her and recognizes her as the girl who saved him. He immediately makes her a fugitive in order to force her to become his wife. He is known for his unpredictable temper and is feared by everyone in his court. He has two sons, Fusu (his biological son) and Tianming (Gongsun Li's son).
- Li Tai as Han Shen
  - The senior disciple of both Jing Ke and Gongsun Li. He is in love with her and is willing to protect her with his life. When Li first entered the palace, Han Shen followed her and became an imperial guard to protect her. He is known as a skilled martial artist and sword master.
- Chang Liu as Jing Ke
  - Xu Wangzi as young Jing Ke
  - Gongsun Li's second senior disciple and Han Shen's junior disciple. He is in love with Gongsun Li and has a special relationship with Ge Lan. He is skilled in Swan Swordsmanship, a deadly sword technique that was passed down from his master. He planned to assassinate Ying Zheng, but ultimately failed.
- Zhang Xuan as Ge Lan / Lan'er
  - Jing Ke and Gongsun Li's close friend. She is the daughter of a skilled sword master, Ge Nie. She is in love with Jing Ke, but holds in her feelings because she knows he’ll never love her back. She is light hearted and kind, often putting others before herself.

=== Supporting ===
==== Qin kingdom ====
- Li Qiang as Lü Buwei
  - Ying Zheng's biological father and Prime minister of Qin who used his son to gain his position in the royal court. After he is banished, he faked his death and helped an enemy territory. He is then killed by Ying Zheng.
- Chen Yisha as Lady Zhao, the Queen Dowager
  - Ying Zheng's mother and Lü Buwei's lover who was honoured as "Queen Dowager" after her son's ascension. After her lover, Lao Ai is killed, she goes crazy and is confined in the Southern Palace under Ying Zheng's command.
- Yang Tong as Li Zhong
  - Ying Zheng's closest friend and head of the royal palace guards.
- Su Youchen as Chengjiao, Lord of Chang'an
  - Ying Zheng's brother who was coerced to rebel and surrendered while punished by reduction to a lower rank. They indirectly make peace thanks to Gongsun Li's intervention.
- Liao Xueqiu as Queen Dowager Huayang
  - Ying Zheng's grandmother and the head of the harem, who was born in Chu State. She hates Gongsun Li and would do anything to make sure she doesn’t become queen.
- Wang Ting as Chu Ruo
  - Ying Zheng's concubine born into the Chu Royal family and is close with Queen Dowager Huayang. She is scheming and sabotages Gongsun Li as much as possible. However, she grows to be a more mature and considerate person, even advising Li'er to protect herself against Ying Zheng.
  - "Madam Chu" (楚夫人), demoted to "Concubine Chu" (楚良人) and later promoted again to "Madam Chu" (楚夫人)
- Qiu Yinong as Min Dai
  - Gongsun Li's close friend who later betrays her due to her vicious heart. It is then revealed that she purposely married into Qin so she could help her homeland.
  - "Madam Min" (敏夫人)
- Li Xiapei as Concubine Han
  - One of Ying Zheng's concubines who was killed by Min Dai.
- Zhang Gu as Zhao Gao
  - Ying Zheng's advisor who is willing to do anything to help his homeland, Zhao. He worked with Madam Min in order to ensure Zhao's safety.
- Zhao Tingliang as Li Si
  - A member of the Qin royal court who is jealous of anybody who could threaten his position.
- Liu Haochen as Lao Ai
  - Qin's false eunuch and Queen Dowager Zhao's lover. After committing adultery with her, he used her seal to rebel and was then punished by Ying Zheng.
- Zhou Xiaopeng as Sikong Ma
- Yuan He as Yao Jia
- Cheng Dachun as Ji Fengjian
  - One of the four villains in Xianyang killed by Ge Nie's sword.
- Zhu He as Mang Bianlin
  - One of the four villains in Xianyang killed by Ge Nie's sword.
- Li Junying as Kuang Huoquan
  - One of the four villains in Xianyang killed by Ge Nie's sword.
- Yuan Zhiwei as Rui Daoshan
  - One of the four villains in Xianyang killed by Ge Nie's sword.
- Huang Qian as Meng Wu
  - A warrior of Qin during the Warring States Period who become Ying Zheng's trusted general.
- Meng Yuli as Concubine Jing
  - Ying Zheng's concubine.
- Lü Yingna as Qing'er
  - Gongsun Li's maidservant in the palace.

==== Yan kingdom ====
- Sean Pai Yixiang as Crown Prince Ji Dan / Yan Dan
  - Prince of Yan who was imprisoned for his whole life in Qin. Although Ying Zheng views him as a close friend, Dan believes that Ying Zheng is a cruel person. Gongsun Li then helped him escape back to Yan.
- Yao Kan as Tian Guang
  - Yan Dan's royal tutor and Yan's strategist who sacrifices himself for Dan.
- Jiang Yi as Gao Jianli
  - Yan's ranger and Jing Ke's confidant.
- Liu Yiyang as Qin Wuyang
  - Yan's deputy envoy and Jing Ke's assistant.

=== Others ===
- Wang Tonghui as Ge Nie
  - Jing Ke's good friend. He is known as the world's best swordsman.
- Yang Zhe as Gongsun Yu, Gongsun Li's grandfather and a great general of the Wei State.
- Sun Kan as Crown Prince Jia, Zhao Royal family's member.
- Lin Jiandong as Dou Yi, "Poison Needle Demon King" (毒针妖王)
- Jin Youming as Xiahou Yang, Dan's person who works for Li Si and later died under Ge Nie's sword.
- Zhang Bowen as four-year-old Ying Tianming, Gongsun Li's son with Jing Ke.
  - Yin Haoquan as nine-year-old Ying Tianming
- Zhao Zuoshan as King Xi of Yan
- Chen Jingyu as Lord Tang
- Zhang Haifeng as King of Han State
- Shen Xuewei as Zi Chu
- Cheng Cheng as Lord of Changping
- Wei Zhiqiang as Lu Goujian
- Bai Jincheng as Ju Wu
- Wu Chenchao as Bao Ye
- Jiang Ke as Xuan Wu

== Production ==
The producing team of The King's Woman included Chen Minzheng, the fashion designer for Empresses in the Palace and the creative director for Nirvana in Fire and The Disguiser, Zhao Changyong.

=== Casting ===
To immerse in the role, Vin Zhang prepared a for a month beforehand to learn about the related history and the background of Qin Shi Huang. During this period, Zhang also learnt horse riding for the scenes required by the series. The King's Woman is Dilraba Dilmurat's fourth collaboration with Vin Zhang after V Love, Eternal Love, and Pretty Li Hui Zhen.

=== Filming ===
The series was filmed on set at the Hengdian Studios throughout the Lunar New Year of 2017.

== Soundtrack ==
The King's Woman - Original Television Soundtrack (秦时丽人明月心电视剧原声音乐大碟)
No.	Title	Music	Length
1.	"Follow You through Life and Death (生死相随)" (Ending theme song)	Cui Zige & Roger Yang	3:50
2.	"Fated (注定)"	Chang Sisi	4:24
3.	"Hundred Flowers Wilted (百花残)"	Cui Zige	4:34
4.	"Love Hasn't Ended (情未央)"	Cui Zige	4:28
5.	""Untiteled(无题)""

== Reception ==
The drama garnered over 1.5 billion viewers in total on Youku. The series placed first in television ratings and became one of the most searched and discussed topic online during its broadcast with around 1.2 billion readers on Weibo and shares over 5 million.

China Zhejiang TV premiere ratings (CSM52)
Broadcast date	Episodes	Ratings (%)	Audience share (%)	Rank
2017-08-14	1-2	0.984	5.406	1
2017-08-15	3-4	0.696	3.880	3
2017-08-16	5-6	0.873	4.882	2
2017-08-21	7-8	0.890	5.089	1
2017-08-22	9-10	0.881	4.905	2
2017-08-23	11-12	0.854	4.856	2
2017-08-28	13-14	0.953	5.400	1
2017-08-29	15-16	1.083	6.221	1
2017-08-30	17-18	0.996	5.884	1
2017-09-04	19-20	0.587	3.930	2
2017-09-05	21-22	0.628	3.780	1
2017-09-06	23-24	0.452	2.904	3
2017-09-11	25-26	0.537	3.313	2
2017-09-12	27-28	0.504	3.011	2
2017-09-13	29-30	0.556	3.545	2
2017-09-18	31-32	0.436	2.888	3
2017-09-19	33-34	0.620	3.980	1
2017-09-20	35-36	0.722	4.619	1
2017-09-25	37-38	0.720	4.838	1
2017-09-26	39-40	0.621	4.228	1
2017-09-27	41-42	0.591	3.847	1
2017-10-02	43-44	0.645	3.762	1
2017-10-03	45-46	0.804	4.570	1
2017-10-04	47-48	1.041	5.950	1

== International broadcast ==
Country	Network	Airing dates
China	Zhejiang TV (浙江卫视)	August 14, 2017 - October 4, 2017 (Star Theater Monday to Wednesday 22: 00-23: 30)
Malaysia	8TV	5 January 2018 – 2018 (Best of the East: Asian Selection Monday through Friday 20:30 - 21:30)
Hong Kong	myTV SUPER	October 3, 2017 - December 7, 2017 (Monday to Friday 11:45 - 12:45, 15:15 - 16:15, 18:00 - 18:45, 19:30 - 20:30 and 22:30 - 23:30)
Hong Kong	TVB Chinese Drama (華語劇台)	October 3, 2017 (Monday to Friday 22: 30-23: 30)
Singapore	StarHub (Hub VV Drama channel)	November 26, 2017 - February 17, 2018 (Saturday, Sunday 19:15 - 21:00; two episodes per day)
Taiwan	緯來戲劇台	December 22, 2017 (Monday to Friday 22:00 - 23:00)
Taiwan	LTV (龍華數位媒體科技)	December 25, 2017 (Monday to Friday 19:00-20:00)
Thailand	Channel 9 MCOT HD	March 24, 2018 - June 10, 2018 (9 SERIES Every Saturday and Sunday from 14.05 - 15.50)
Thailand	Channel 9 MCOT HD	March 8, 2021 - J 00, 2021 (PREMIUM SERIES Every Monday, Tuesday and Wednesday from 22.30-23.30)
Myanmar	CANAL+ MAE MADI	April 12, 2018 - September 18, 2018 (Every Tuesday, Thursday 20:00 - 21:30)
Southeast Asia	tvN (Asia)	Every Monday To Saturday 17:30-18:30
Vietnam	VTV3	5 - 29 January 2019 (every day 17:20-18:50; two episodes per day) As Lệ Cơ truyện
India	Trm-C Drama	3 Dec 2024 - 29 Jan 2025 ( Every Monday Wednesday, Thursday 18:00) As same Title
