= The Legend of Haolan =

- Drama poster
- Also known as: Beauty Haolan
- Traditional Chinese: 皓鑭傳
- Simplified Chinese: 皓镧传
- Hanyu Pinyin: Hào Lán Zhuàn
- Genre: Historical fiction
- Written by: Er Di
- Directed by: Li Dachao
- Starring: Wu Jinyan; Mao Zijun; Nie Yuan
- Country of origin: China
- Original language: Mandarin
- No. of episodes: 62

Production
- Executive producer: Yu Zheng
- Production company: Huanyu Film

Original release
- Network: iQiyi (China); Star Chinese Channel (Southeast Asia Distribution)
- Release: January 19 – March 24, 2019

The Legend of Haolan (Chinese: 皓镧传) is a 2019 Chinese television series starring Wu Jinyan, Mao Zijun and Nie Yuan. It was broadcast on iQiyi from January 19 to March 24, 2019, and was one of the most highly anticipated television dramas of the year.

Despite the show's good ratings, it failed to live up to the success of 2018's Story of Yanxi Palace.

== Synopsis ==
The series is set during the Warring States period (3rd century BC), and chronicles the rise of Li Haolan to become the Empress Dowager.

Betrayed by her family and her first love, Li Haolan finds herself in desperate circumstances at the start of the series. Her father, State Censor Li He, arranges marriage between her and the far-older Yu Ping, who treats his other wives brutally. When she tries to circumvent this fate by begging her first love, Prince Jiao, ask to marry her, Li Haolan's stepmother, Gao Min, orders her killed and thrown into the river. Surviving only by chance, Li Haolan crawls back from the brink of death to discover her reputation in tatters, as Gao Min spread the rumor that Li Haolan shamed the family by eloping with a stranger to explain the girl's disappearance. Li Haolan's mother, Wang Wan'er, a lowly concubine, has gone mad with grief over her daughter's unknown fate. Gao Min orders the murder of Li Haolan's mother and sells Li Haolan into slavery, just as Li Haolan watches her sweetheart marrying her little sister, Li Xiuyu.

Stricken with the knowledge of everyone's complicity, and unable to return home, Li Haolan vows she will never beg for another thing in her life as she tries to claw her way out of her fallen circumstances and avenge the death of her mother and the wrongs done to her. The scheming merchant Lü Buwei purchases Li Haolan and takes interest in the fate of this intelligent, unusual girl. Together, they form an unlikely partnership as they both begin to climb the ladders of power.

Through Lü Buwei's influence, Li Haolan enters Zhao's imperial court and makes a match with Ying Yiren, the captive prince of Qin. As Qin and Zhao fall into war, the balance of power changes, with Li Haolan on top.

== Cast ==
=== Main ===
- Wu Jinyan as Li Haolan / Zhao Ji
  - Li He's eldest daughter, by Wang Wan'er. Intelligent, talented, and kind, this favored daughter of a high official becomes a woman fiercely determined to avenge the wrongs done to her and gain enough power to ensure no one can bend her pride again after she is sold into slavery. Because they are on the same path for power, she makes a pact with Lü Buwei to act as his partner. She is unafraid to call out misbehavior and demands she be treated fairly. She eventually becomes the wife of King Zhuangxiang of Qin and the mother of Qin Shi Huang, the first emperor of China.
- Nie Yuan as Lü Buwei
  - A scheming merchant with a reputation for cunning and excellent business sense, Lü Buwei understands the importance of appearance and connections. Despite being from the wealthiest family in Zhao, the upper classes were allowed to step on Lü Buwei and his father due to their merchant status, causing him to vow that, one day, he would have more power and influence than them all. He often hides his altruism under the guise of profit scheming and is never afraid to take advantage of a bad situation, causing others to misunderstand him.
- Mao Zijun as Ying Yiren/Zichu
  - Lord Anguo's son, by his concubine Xia Ji, adopted by his wife Lady Huayang. A prince of Qin, later known as King Zhuangxiang of Qin and the father of Qin Shi Huang, the first emperor of China. Initially the insignificant 27th prince of Qin, Yiren is held in the Zhao imperial court as a royal hostage to ensure the compliance of his home country of Qin. He loves art and music, and is kind to those beneath him, but hates his captors. His warm, pleasant demeanor hides chilly depths.

=== Supporting ===
==== Zhao ====
- Wang Zhifei as Zhao Dan
  - King Xiaocheng of Zhao. A specially known lover of beauty and dancing girls, the King of Zhao can be superstitious and fills his harem with easy distractions.
- Ning Jing as Lady Li
  - King Xiaocheng's queen. Often overlooked, Queen Li is extremely intelligent and extremely bored. She easily sees through most schemes, including Haolan's, though she favors keeping the knowledge to herself. Li Haolan's quick wits endear her to the Queen, who makes Haolan her maid-in-waiting as a form of amusement and mental exercise.
- Yin Xu as Lady Yun Chisu
  - A dancing girl, later King Xiaocheng's concubine. Mother of Prince Yu.
- Yang Caiying as Lady Mei
  - King Xiaocheng's concubine. Unable to get pregnant as a result of the devilry of Lady Li.
- Zhang Nan as Han Qionghua
  - A princess of Han, later King Xiaocheng's concubine. Lover of Prince Yu.
- Hong Yao as Prince Jiao
  - King Xiaocheng's eldest son, by his concubine Lady Gao, adopted by his queen Lady Li. Li Xiuyu's husband. He shared a first love with Li Haolan and vowed to her that they'd marry. Self-important and selfish, he has very high political aspirations, which Li Haolan's status as concubine-born would have inconvenienced. Because of this, he looks the other way when Haolan is in danger and marries her younger sister. He is quick to impetuously demand his way and not afraid to spread false accusations to get it.
- He Fengtian as Prince Yu
  - King Xiaocheng's second son, by his concubine Lady Yun.
- Zhao Yiqin as Prince Yi
  - King Xiaocheng's third son, by his concubine Lady Yuan.
- Hai Ling as Princess Ya
  - King Xiaocheng's daughter, by his Queen Lady Li. The fiery spirit of a warrior trapped in the body of the King's favorite and most-indulged daughter. She fancies herself in love with the hostage prince of Qin, Prince Yinren. In temperament, Princess Ya resembles a child crushing to death a bird she's caught and is loving to death. A creature of extreme opposites: she is both smotheringly obsessive and possessive towards the things she wants, but dismissive and destructive of everything else. She is also quickly bored and changeable once she gets what she desires.
- Liu Enshang as Zhao Sheng
  - Lord Pingyuan. The Prime Minister of Zhao. Interacting with the normal classes more often than his superiors and savvy at navigating the ridiculous whims of the upper nobility, the Prime Minister is a surprisingly practical and intelligent official who does much to ensure the state continues to function equally and practically.
- Nan Fulong as Gongsun Qian, a general.
- Jiang Zixin as Yin Xiaochun
  - A physician. No-nonsense doctor who does not accept bribes. Yin Xiaochun is a rare female physician and the best doctor in the Zhao court.
- Lu Zhongtai as The Director of the Grand Diviners.
- Yang Hongwu as Gao Meng, a general.
- Pei Zitian as Gao Haoyang, a general.
- Yao Weiping as Lian Po, a general.
- Lian Lian as Xiao Hongye, Lady Li's servant.
- Zhang Jingru as Azhao, Lady Li's servant.
- Shi Jingzi as Lüzhu
  - Han Qionghua's servant, later Lady Li's servant.
- Chen Haoming as Xiaxue
  - Princess Ya's servant.
- Du Lingli as Baihe
  - A servant in Xuri Palace.

==== Lü household ====
- Wen Haibo as Lü Xin, Lü Buwei's father.
- Gao Yu'er as Yao Ji, Lü Buwei's dancing girl.
- Zheng Long as Situ Que
  - Situ Yue's elder brother. Lü Buwei's servant.
- Zhang Yixi as Situ Yue
  - Situ Que's younger sister. Lü Buwei's servant, later a servant in the palace.

==== Bai household ====
- Yu Yankai as Bai Qi, Lord Wu'an.
- Li Chuan as Bai Zhong, Bai Qi's son.
- Pu Guanjin as Bai Ling'er, Bai Qi's daughter. She is silly and capricious, and doesn't think about the consequences of her actions. She falls in love with Lu Buwei and tricks Yiren into arranging her marriage to him. Ling'er never stops loving Lu, who is longing for Haolan, and meets her death sacrificing her life for him.

==== Li household ====
- Shen Baoping as Li He
  - Li Haolan's father. The Censor of Zhao. Motivated by personal and familial glory and willing to take hand ups to get it. Li He is aware of the truth behind Li Haolan's circumstances, but, despite his apparent sorrow over the situation of his favorites, makes no effort to champion her or her mother since he benefits from their suffering.
- Lu Ling as Wang Wan'er
  - Li He's first wife/concubine, Li Haolan's mother. Though legally his wife and first in his affections, Li He used Wang Wan'er's foreign status to disregard the law and demoted her from her position as main wife, reducing her to a concubine, when the rich and powerful Gao Min expressed her desire to marry him.
- Wang Lin as Gao Min
  - Li He's main wife. Cruel and calculating, Gao Min thinks little of taking brutal action against others in her quest to get what she desires. She uses her family affluence and shark-like intelligence to rule the Li family.
- Li Chun'ai as Li Xiuyu
  - Li He's younger daughter, by his second wife Gao Min. Prince Jiao's wife. Though close as children, Li Xiuyu has long envied her more talented and favored older sister, Li Haolan, and ultimately shows her true colors as an adult.
- Liu Shitong as Fangcao
  - Gao Min's servant, later Li Xiuyu's servant.

==== Yu household ====
- Wang Jianguo as Yu Ping
  - The Minister of Criminal Justice of Zhao. Yu Ping has a brutish reputation and several of his past wives have died under suspicious circumstances. The Li family owes Yu Ping and offending him could have dire consequences. Yu Ping's undesired request for Li Haolan's hand in marriage sets her initial fall from grace.
- Gong Zhengnan as Yu Hao
  - Yu Ping's eldest son. A petty bully with none of the intelligence of his father, but all of the entitlement.

==== Qin ====
- He Qiang as Ying Ji
  - Ying Yiren's grandfather. Lord Anguo's father. King Zhao Xiang of Qin.
- Wang Maolei as Ying Zhu
  - Ying Yiren's father. Lord Anguo. The Crown Prince of Qin, later King Xiaowen of Qin.
- Tan Zhuo as Lady Huayang
  - A lady of the Mi clan of Chu. Lord Anguo's wife. Ying Yiren's adoptive mother. The future Queen of Qin and Queen Dowager Huayang of Qin.
- He Jiayi as Xia Ji
  - Lord Anguo's concubine. Ying Yiren's mother. The future Queen Dowager Xia of Qin.
- Wang Yu as Ying Zixi, Lord Anguo's son.
- Fang Anna as Siluo, Ying Yiren's concubine. Siluo is extremely jealous of Haolan and is neglected by Yiren. She is executed after her numerous crimes against Haolan and the state are revealed.
- Tong Mengshi as Ying Zheng
  - Ying Yiren's eldest son, by his wife Li Haolan. A prince of Qin, later the Crown Prince of Qin and Qin Shi Huang.
- Zhu Jian as Lao Ai, Youngest son of King of Han.
  - Saved by Haolan because he claims to be Han Qionghua's younger step-brother. Admires Haolan. (Historically Haolan's hidden lover, according to Sima Qian)

==== Fan household ====
- Tan Jianchang as Fan Ju, The Prime Minister of Qin.
- Xu Muchan as Fan Ya, Fan Ju's daughter.
- Gu Kaili as Fan Ya's nanny.

==== Chu ====
- Zhao Jiuyi as Xiong Wan
  - The Crown Prince of Chu, later King Kaolie of Chu.
- Liu Min as Lady Xiong
  - Lady Huayang's elder sister. Wife of Marquis Xuan.
- Zhou Yunshen as Xiong Chen
  - Lady Huayang's younger brother. Lord Yangquan.

==== Others ====
- Tang Xiangen as Zhu Xian
- Hong Shiya as Cheng Xiu
  - killed by Lü Buwei.
- Wang Meixin as Pang Min
  - Daughter of a Qin Officer. Admirer of Prince Yu.

== Production ==
The series was filmed from December 20, 2017, to April 8, 2018.

The series was originally slated to have 63 episodes, but the 63rd and final episode was cut due to historical inaccuracies. The new finale is a narrated voiceover at the conclusion of Episode 62.

== Awards and nominations ==
Award	Category	Nominee	Results	Ref.
Golden Bud - The Fourth Network Film And Television Festival	Best Web Series	The Legend of Haolan	Nominated	
Golden Bud - The Fourth Network Film And Television Festival	Best Actress	Wu Jinyan	Nominated	

== International broadcast ==
Region	Network	Dates	Notes
Hong Kong, Macau, Singapore, Australia, United States, Malaysia Astro AOD and Worldwide	TVB Jade	4 February - 14 April (Monday-Friday at 8:30 p.m) (Two Episode Back To Back for Saturday at 8:30 p.m)	Dubbed With Cantonese.
Hong Kong and Southeast Asia	Star Chinese Channel	19 January-16 April 2019 Weekdays 22:00	Selection Countries Only
Republic of Korea	Channel China	4 July 2019	
Thailand	Channel 3	1 November 2023 Everyday 02:50	Dubbed with Thai
