= The Destiny of White Snake =

- Genre: Mythology; Fantasy; Romance
- Based on: Legend of the White Snake
- Written by: Han Peizhen; Liu Ya; Li Zhenru
- Directed by: Yi Tao; Liu Guohui
- Starring: Yang Zi; Ren Jialun; Mao Zijun; Li Man
- Country of origin: China
- Original language: Mandarin
- No. of seasons: 1
- No. of episodes: 60

Production
- Production location: Hengdian World Studios
- Running time: 45 mins
- Production companies: H&R Century Pictures; Innovation Media Power; Shanghai New Culture

Original release
- Network: iQiyi
- Release: July 9, 2018

The Destiny of White Snake (Chinese: 天乩之白蛇传说) is a 2018 Chinese television series loosely based on the Chinese ancient folk legend Legend of the White Snake. It stars Yang Zi, Ren Jialun, Mao Zijun and Li Man. The series airs on iQiyi from July 9, 2018.

== Synopsis ==
Zi Xuan is the disciple of the Green Emperor and he specializes in medicine and is cultivating to become a deity. He meets a young white snake, whom he nicknamed Xiao Bai, and kept as a pet. Over the course of time, Xiao Bai gathered enough cultivation to transform into a teenage human girl, and she eventually grows closer to Zi Xuan and developed a strong romance with him. While trying to find a herb that would save Zi Xuan's life after he is injured, she accidentally breaks a heavenly seal at the elixir chamber of Mount Jiuxi and releases an ancient beast, the black water dragon, from thousand years of imprisonment on the human world. To save the world, Zi Xuan sacrifices himself and disintegrates, but before he fades, he gives Xiao Bai a proper name: Bai Yaoyao.

After Zi Xuan's death, Bai Yaoyao is devastated and decides to retreat from the world. A thousand years pass by and they meet again. Zi Xuan, now reborn as Xu Xian, who is the chief of the Yao Shi Palace (medicine valley), remembers nothing of his and Bai YaoYao's past. However, she remembers everything and she tries to ensure that he lives a peaceful life.

== Cast ==
=== Main ===
Actor	Character	Introduction
Yang Zi	Bai YaoYao / Xiao Bai	A cultivating white snake-demon who later transforms into a human girl. Disciple of Holy Mother of Mount Li. Later developed a relationship with Xu Xian / Zi Xuan.
Ren Jialun	Xu Xian / Zi Xuan	Chief of Yao Shi Palace (Medicine Valley). A cultivating doctor who was an immortal cultivating to become a deity and was a disciple of the Green Emperor in his previous lifetime. Has the fate of Seven Prowesses (destined to be alone for rest of his lifetime).
Mao Zijun	Fa Hai / Qi Xiao / Ling Chu	A demon catcher who was the disciple of the White Emperor in his previous lifetime. Later he becomes a monk at Mount Jin Temple. Has the fate of Alkaid (destined to slay evil and cultivate for rest of his lifetime).
Li Man	Xiao Qing	A green snake-demon who had an ill fated relationship with Fa Hai / Qi Xiao / Ling Chu. Friend of Bai Yaoyao. Leader of a band of minor demons residing in a mountain near Yao Shi Palace. Destined to be slain by Fa Hai / Qi Xiao / Ling Chu as the last demon in his mortal trial, but, instead, sacrifices her immortality to save Fa Hau / Qi Xiao / Ling Chu and Bai YaoYao.

=== Supporting ===
Actor	Character	Introduction
He Dujuan	Leng Ning	Mistress of Yao Shi Palace (Medicine Valley). Xu Xian's disciple junior. Jealous of Bai Yaoyao's relationship with Xu Xian and becomes evil and eventually turn into a demon. She slowly became a pawn of Taotie who he use against Xu Xian and Bai Yaoyao.
Carina Lau	Queen Mother of the West	Owner of Saturn Peach Garden.
Angie Chiu	Holy Mother of Mount Li	Mentor of Bai Yaoyao.
He Zhonghua	White Emperor	Mentor of Ling Chu. Chief of Kunlun Mountain
Zhu Xiaoyu	Green Emperor	Mentor of Zi Xuan. Chief of Mount Jiuxi
Liu Xueyi	Heavenly Emperor	Ruler of the Immortal Realm (Empyrean Heaven) . Older twin brother of Zhan Huang, He was originally from the demon clan which was kept secret from the Immortal realm and not many has seen his true face. Has estrange relationship with his younger twin brother, Zhan Huang
Liu Xueyi	Zhan Huang (Demon Emperor)	A five colored Qilin demon. Ruler of the Demons and Bei Huang that who fancies Bai Yaoyao because she gathered his broken spirit accidentally unknowingly while searching for Zi Xuan's scatter soul fragments . Has the fate of Dubhe (Greedy wolf, destine to swallow everything, cause chaos and destruction). Seek to steal the other two fates and start war against Immortal Realm (Empyrean Heaven). Resent his older twin brother for having better life than him and being the pitiful one due having the fate of Dubhe. Has command of nature ability given by Heavenly Emperor thousand years ago which allows him command and force all demons to obey him his orders so he could become Demon Emperor of Bei Huang where the demon clans reside .
Luo Mi	Die Man	Butterfly Demon, Subordinate of Taotie, disguised herself as a physician in the mortal realm. Working with Leng Ning under the order of Taotie.
Alen Tan	Ni Yun	Demon, Subordinate of Zhan Huang
Zhang Moyang	Immortal Crane	Xu Xuan's childhood friend.
Wang Jinsong	Baicao Xian Jun / Leng Hui Chun	Herb deity of Penglai Heavenly Mountain, Previous chief and founder of Yao Shi Palace (Medicine Valley) and father of Leng Ning during his mortal trial.
Fu Fang Jun	Taotie	Son of East Sea dragon king, former mount of White Emperor. Rebel against the Immortal Realm because of on longer want to serve the Immortals and tries to cause chaos by releasing ancient beast, Black water dragon into mortal realm a thousand years ago after escaping his imprisonment. Archenemy of Zi Xuan who destroy his deity seed causing him to lose his physical form and wandering between three realms for a thousand years with a fragment of his soul . Parts of fragmented soul cultivate into a plague demon after a thousand years later after his battle against Zi Xuan.
Shen Bao Ping	Master Yuan Yi	Chief of Demon Hunter villa, Mentor of Qi Xiao, possessed by Taotie who needed a temporary vessel for his fragmented soul.
He Lin	Xu Jiao Rong	Older sister of Xu Xian, a famous matchmaker who wants her young brother, Xu Xian, to marry Leng Ni.
Lu Peng	Qing Feng	Disciple of the Yao Shi Palace (Medicine Valley)
Zhao Wen Hao	Xiao Hui	A rabbit demon, underling of Xiao Qing who secretly works for Taotie due being blackmailed since his family are his hostages.
Jing Ci	Hong Xin	A carp demon who has unrequited love for Zhao Yu (Xiao Wang Ye), a prince in the mortal realm who save her three years ago.

== Production ==
Filming commenced at Hengdian World Studios on January 15, 2017 and wrapped up on June 5, 2017.

Interesting Fact

- Angie Chiu, who portrayed Bai Su Zhen in the 1992's New Legend of Madame White Snake now portrayed Bai Yaoyao's teacher, Holy Mother of Mount Li in this drama

== Soundtrack ==
No.	Title	Lyrics	Music	Singers	Length
1.	"Ruo Shui (弱水)" (Opening theme song)	Duan Sisi	Tan Xuan	Richie Jen
2.	"Flowing Years (流年)" (Ending theme song)	Liao Yu, He Kuanghui	He Kuanghui, Wang Xintong	He Jie
3.	"A Thousand Years (千年)"	Liao Yu, He Kuanghui	He Kuanghui, Wang Xintong	Jin Zhiwen & Jike Junyi
4.	"Monologue (独白)"	Liao Yu	He Kuanghui, Wang Xintong	Zhou Shen (version 1), 音频怪物 (version 2)
5.	"Fan Xin (凡心)"	Zhou Jieying, Dong Zhen	Lin Huayong	Dong Zhen
6.	"Few Lifetimes of Happiness (几生欢)"	Duan Sisi	Tan Xuan	Yang Zi

== Awards and nominations ==
Award	Category	Nominated work	Result	Ref.
Influence of Recreational Responsibilities Awards	Web Drama of the Year		Won	

== International broadcast ==
Country	Network(s)/Station(s)	Series premiere	Title
Thailand	MCOT HD	June 3, 2019 (Every Monday, Tuesday and Wednesday from 21.00 - 22.00 hrs.)	The Destiny of White Snake นางพญางูขาว ( ; lit: Madam White Snake)
Thailand	MCOT HD	June 10, 2021 (Every Monday to Friday from 18:00 - 19:00)	The Destiny of White Snake นางพญางูขาว ( ; lit: Madam White Snake)
