= Lü Buwei =

Chinese merchant and politician of the Qin state (291–235 BCE)

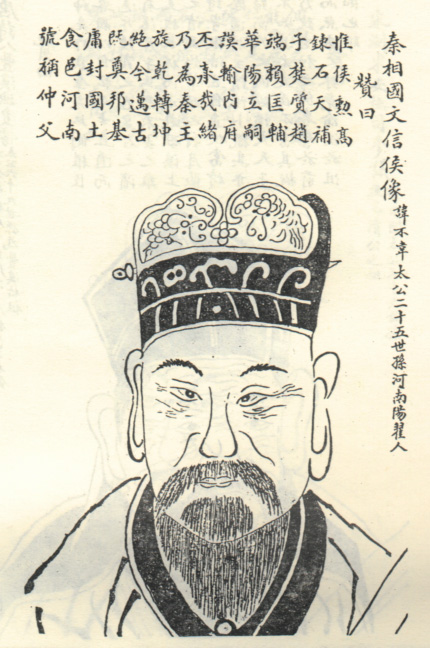

Chancellor of Qin
- In office 251 BCE – 235 BCE
- Monarchs: King Zhuangxiang of Qin; Ying Zheng
- Succeeded by: Li Si

Personal details
- Born: 291 BCE
- Died: 235 BCE (aged 55–56)
- Occupation: Merchant, politician

Lü Buwei
- Traditional Chinese: 呂不韋
- Simplified Chinese: 吕不韦
Transcriptions
Standard Mandarin
- Hanyu Pinyin: Lǚ Bùwéi
- Wade–Giles: Lü^{3} Pu^{4}-wei^{2}
- IPA: [lỳ pû.wèɪ]
Yue: Cantonese
- Yale Romanization: Léuih Bāt-wàih
- Jyutping: Leoi^{5} Bat^{1}-wai^{4}
- IPA: [lɵɥ˩˧ pɐt̚˥.wɐj˩]
Southern Min
- Tâi-lô: Lī Put-uî
Old Chinese
- Baxter–Sagart (2014): *[r]aʔ pə [ɢ]ʷə[j]

Lü Buwei (291–235 BCE) was a Warring States period Chinese merchant and eventual late pre-imperial Qin state Chancellor. Originally an influential merchant from the Wey (衛) state, Lü Buwei met and befriended King Zhuangxiang of Qin, who was then a minor prince serving as a hostage in the Zhao state. Through bribes and machinations, Lü Buwei succeeded in helping King Zhuangxiang become the heir apparent to the Qin throne. After King Zhuangxiang ascended the throne following the death of his father, King Xiaowen, he appointed Lü Buwei as his chancellor (相邦) in 249 BCE, and ennobled him as "Marquis Wenxin" (文信侯). After King Zhuangxiang's death in 247 BCE, Lü Buwei became the chancellor and regent to King Zhuangxiang's young son, Ying Zheng, who later became Qin Shi Huang (First Emperor of the Qin dynasty).

In 235 BCE, after being implicated in a scandal involving the Queen Dowager Zhao (Ying Zheng's mother) and her illicit lover Lao Ai, Lü Buwei was stripped of his posts and titles and was banished to the remote Shu region in the south of Qin. While in exile, Lü Buwei committed suicide by consuming poison.

Apart from his political career, Lü Buwei is also known for sponsoring the Lüshi Chunqiu, an encyclopaedic compendium of the ideas of the Hundred Schools of Thought that was published in 239 BCE.

== Life ==
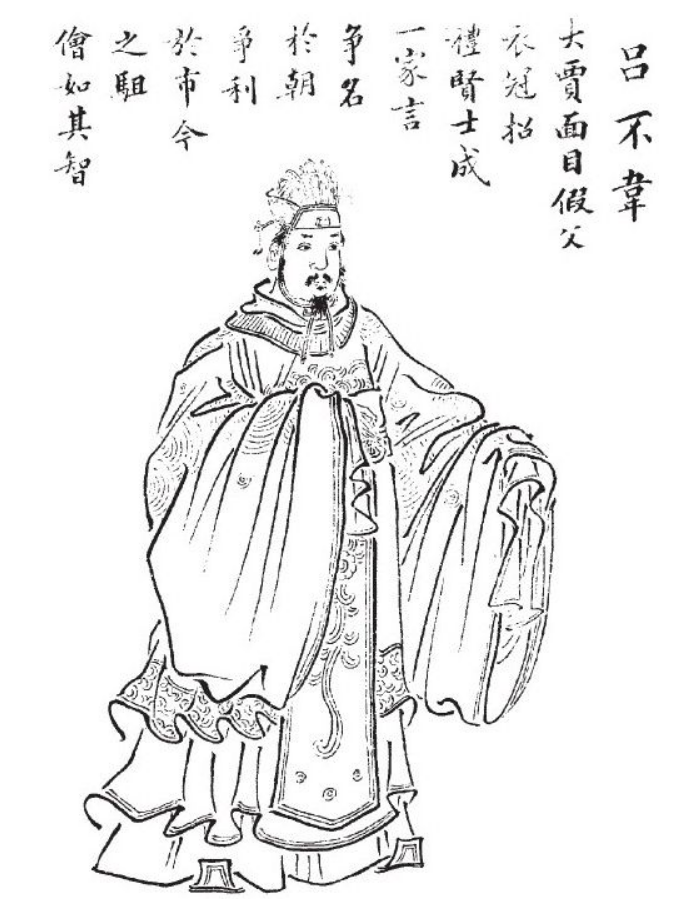
Lü Buwei

The primary sources of information about Lü Buwei date from the first century BCE: Sima Qian's Shiji (Records of the Grand Historian), and Liu Xiang's Zhan Guo Ce (Strategies of the Warring States) and Shuoyuan (說苑, Garden of Stories). Since these three Han dynasty texts openly criticise both Lü Buwei and the Qin dynasty, some alleged stories (for example, Lü's private thoughts and conversations) can be discounted. Note that some of the following English translations come from John Knoblock and Jeffrey Riegel's scholarly study of the Lüshi Chunqiu.

Lü Buwei's biography in the Shiji mentioned that he was from the Wey state and he became a successful travelling merchant earning "thousands of measures of gold". In 267 BCE, the first son of King Zhaoxiang of the Qin state died, so King Zhaoxiang named his second son, Lord Anguo, as his new heir apparent. Lord Anguo promoted his concubine, Lady Huayang (華陽夫人), who was childless, to the status of his primary spouse. Lord Anguo had over twenty sons. Among them, Yiren, who ranked somewhere in the middle in terms of age, was sent to the Zhao state to serve as a royal hostage. When Lü Buwei was trading in Handan, the capital of Zhao, he met Yiren and said, "This is a rare piece of merchandise that should be saved for later."

The Zhan Guo Ce recorded a story about Lü Buwei deciding to switch his career from business to politics.

On returning home, he said to his father, "What is the profit on investment that one can expect from plowing fields?"
"Ten times the investment," replied his father.
"And the return on investment in pearls and jades is how much?"
"A hundredfold."
"And the return on investment from establishing a ruler and securing the state would be how much?"
"It would be incalculable."
"Now if I devoted my energies to labouring in the fields, I would hardly get enough to clothe and feed myself; yet if I secure a state and establish its lord, the benefits can be passed on to future generations. I propose to go serve Prince Yiren of Qin who is a hostage in Zhao and resides in the city of Jiao."

Using bribes and machinations, Lü Buwei arranged for Yiren to return to Qin and successfully persuaded Lady Huayang to adopt Yiren as her son, thereby making Yiren the heir apparent to Lord Anguo. Lady Huayang renamed Yiren to "Zichu" (子楚; lit. "son of Chu") because she was from the Chu state.

The Shiji mentioned that Lü Buwei had a beautiful "dancing girl", Lady Zhao, in his household, with whom Zichu became so infatuated that he asked for her. Lü Buwei reluctantly presented Lady Zhao to Zichu, and they returned to Handan. In 259 BCE, Lady Zhao gave birth to a son, Ying Zheng, who eventually unified China under the Qin dynasty and became historically known as "Qin Shi Huang" (First Emperor of Qin). After the death of King Zhaoxiang in 251 BCE, Lord Anguo was enthroned and became historically known as "King Xiaowen", but he died three days after his coronation in 250 BCE. Zichu succeeded his father and became historically known as "King Zhuangxiang". King Zhuangxiang appointed Lü Buwei as his chancellor (相邦; or prime minister) and enfeoffed him as "Marquis Wenxin" (文信侯) with a taxable fief covering 100,000 households in Luoyang. While in office, Lü Buwei oversaw Qin's military campaigns against neighboring states. When King Zhuangxiang died in 247 BCE, a 13-year-old Ying Zheng succeeded him, while Lü Buwei continued serving as a chancellor (相邦) and regent to the young king.

As the chancellor and regent, Lü Buwei dominated the Qin government and military. He invited famous scholars from all over China to Xianyang, the Qin capital, where they compiled the Lüshi Chunqiu (Lü's Spring and Autumn [Annals]), an encyclopedic compendium of the ideas of the Hundred Schools of Thought.

The Shiji says that Lady Zhao (who became the Queen Dowager after Ying Zheng ascended the throne) pursued many illicit sexual activities, and Lü Buwei,

fearing that discovery would cause disaster to befall him, secretly sought a man with a large penis, Lao Ai [嫪毐], whom he made his retainer. Sometimes he would have music performed and order Lao Ai to put his penis through a wheel of paulownia wood and walk about, making certain that the queen dowager would hear about it to entice her. The queen dowager did hear about it and consequently secretly desired to obtain him. Lü Buwei thereupon introduced Lao Ai to her. Deviously ordering someone to accuse Lao Ai of a crime punishable by castration, Lü also privately told the queen dowager, "If we can fake the castration, we can make him a servant in the harem." The queen dowager therewith covertly gave a generous bribe to the officer charged with castrations to falsely sentence him and to pluck out his eyebrows and beard to make him appear a eunuch. As a result, he was made a servant of the queen dowager.

The Queen Dowager fell in love with Lao Ai and had him enfeoffed as the "Marquis Changxin". After she became pregnant, he recklessly took control of the Qin government.

The Shuoyuan mentioned:

Lao Ai had sole power over the affairs of state and grew increasingly arrogant and extravagant. The high officials and honoured ministers of government all drank and gambled with him. Once when he got drunk, he began to speak belligerently. In a provocative fashion, eyes glaring with anger, he bellowed, "I am the stepfather of the emperor. How dare some wretch oppose me!" One of those with whom he had quarrelled ran to report this to the emperor [Ying Zheng], who was outraged.

Ying Zheng learnt that Lao Ai was not really a eunuch, and had plotted with the Queen Dowager to make their illegitimate son become successor. In 238 BCE, Lao Ai launched a revolt in an attempt to seize power from Ying Zheng, but the rebellion was crushed and Lao Ai was executed along with three generations of his relatives. Ying Zheng stripped his mother of her position as the Queen Dowager and ordered the two sons she secretly had with Lao Ai to be put into sacks and beaten to death. Lü Buwei was implicated in the incident and was stripped of his posts and titles and banished to the remote Shu region in the south of Qin. Lü Buwei feared eventual execution so he committed suicide in 235 BCE by consuming poison. As a result of the Lao Ai affair, Ying Zheng removed power from most of Lü Buwei's retainers and followers (one notable exception being Li Si) and restored it to the hereditary Qin aristocracy. After Lü Buwei's death, the Lüshi Chunqiu fell out of favour with the Qin government, but was resurrected by the Han dynasty later.

Knoblock and Riegel describe the Western and Chinese historical perspectives of Lü Buwei as follows:

Lü engineered the succession of a minor prince to the throne of Qin; and when that prince died after a few months on the throne, Lü became regent for his young son, the future First Emperor of Qin. In the West, we would regard Lü as a merchant-prince, a patron of culture and literature, an eminent statesman and wise counsellor, a kind of Medici prince who influenced not merely Florence and Italy, but all of European civilization. But in China the facts of Lü's life, together with the fact that he was from the despised merchant class, condemned Lü in the eyes of the Han literati. They considered Qin and its unification of China an unmitigated evil. So Lü was in their eyes a parvenu and a fraud whose schemes had made possible Qin's evil. He was a baleful figure, richly deserving of condemnation and eminently worthy of ridicule and calumny.

== In popular culture ==
- Lü Buwei is a major character in the 1999 Chinese film The Emperor and the Assassin, which focuses on the events just before the unification of China by Qin Shi Huang. The true nature of the relationship between the Emperor and Lü Buwei is a major plot point in the story.
- Lü Buwei is played by Kwok Fung in the 2001 Hong Kong television series A Step into the Past, which is based on a novel by Huang Yi. In the series, Ying Zheng is Lü Buwei's biological son, but the revelation is that Ying Zheng had already died in his youth. A young man called Zhao Pan takes on Ying Zheng's identity and, with the help of Xiang Shaolong (a 21st-century Hong Kong policeman who travelled back in time), knocks Lü Buwei out of power. Zhao Pan reveals his true identity to a shocked Lü Buwei later and kills him.
- Lü Buwei is a major character in the historical novel series The Jade Disk by José Frèches.
- The story of Lü Buwei is retold in graphic form, partly framed as a romance comic, in the second volume of The Cartoon History of the Universe.
- Hermann Hesse mentions Lü Buwei in his book The Glass Bead Game as a character that mentions that the quality of the music is directly related to the sense of life that one has.
- Lü Buwei is a character and one of primary antagonists in the Japanese manga Kingdom. The manga and its anime adoption does not deviate heavily from the classical historical portrayal of Lü Buwei, depicting him as a malevolent schemer who aligns himself with his former lover, the Queen Dowager, in order to usurp the throne of Qin, under the guise of helping Ying Zheng. Also, his creation of Lushi Chunqiu was seen too, challenging commoners to change anything on that collection, in exchange of rewards. And he is known to be too rich, he even threw a lavish banquet, including elephants that Lu himself described as a "drop in the bucket". His motive for abandoning Ying for a campaign is for Zhao Chengjiao to usurp the throne and eliminate him when the time comes. This failed, and he was implicated in Lao Ai's rebellion, stripped of everything he has and exiled to Shu. He committed "suicide", but a mysterious carriage leaves the area he was exiled in with dialogue indicating its occupant wished to observe the world that Ying would create as the latter seeks to unify China.
- Lü Buwei appears in the Chinese television series The King's Woman as a true father of Ying Zheng.
- Lü Buwei is portrayed by Nie Yuan in The Legend of Haolan (2019).
- Lü Buwei is portrayed by Duan Yihong in Qin Dynasty Epic (2020).
