= Nie Yuan =

Chinese actor

- 聂远
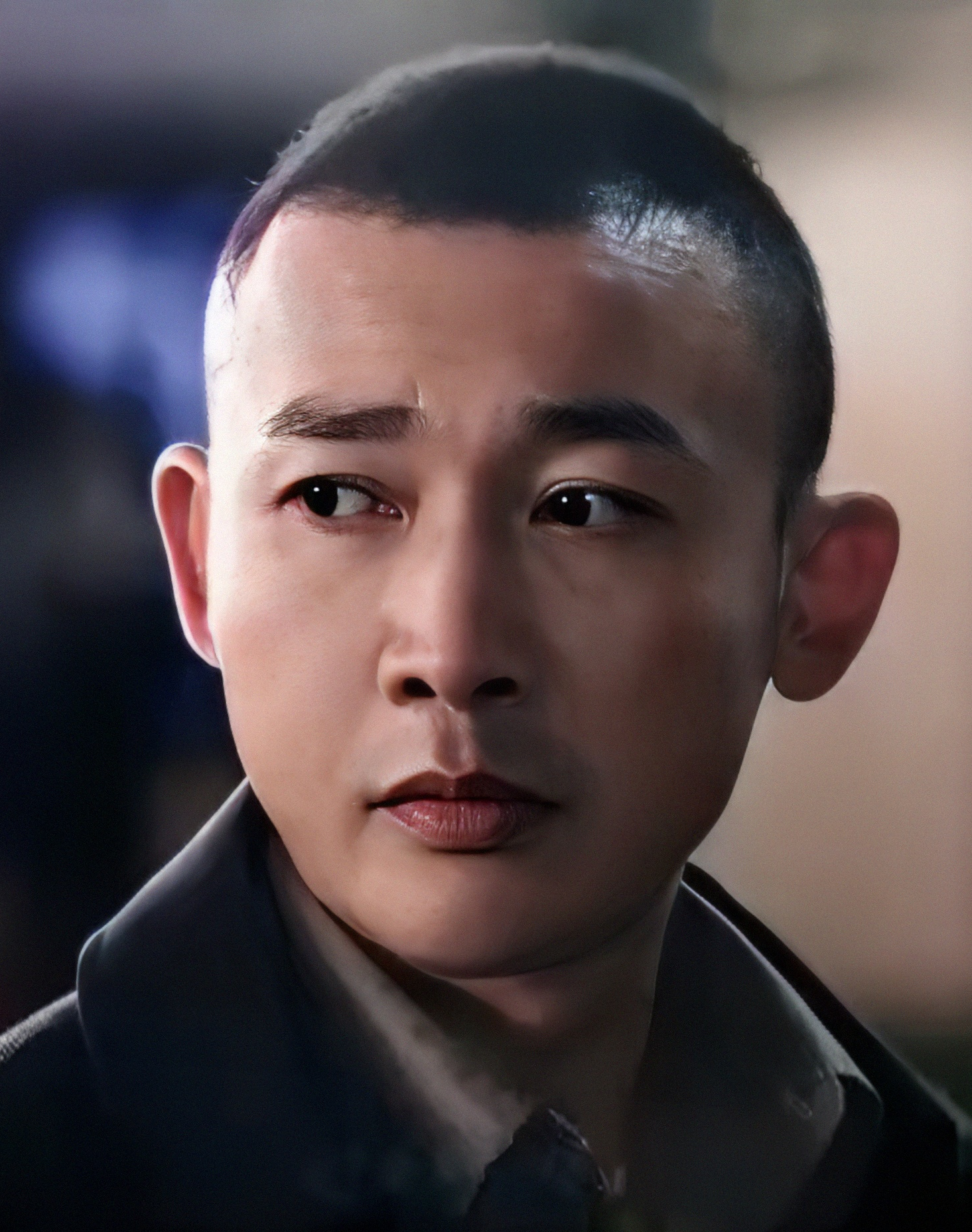
- Nie participated in the iQIYI drama Dark Night and Dawn
- Born: 17 March 1978 (age 48); Zhenyuan County, Qiandongnan, Guizhou, China
- Education: Shanghai Theatre Academy
- Occupation: Actor
- Years active: 1997–present
- Agent: Huanyu Film
- Spouses: Yang Guang (m. 2008; div. 2012) Qin Ziyue (m. 2014)
- Children: 1 daughter (b. 2014)

Chinese name
- Traditional Chinese: 聶遠
- Simplified Chinese: 聂远
Transcriptions
Standard Mandarin
- Hanyu Pinyin: Niè Yuǎn
Yue: Cantonese
- Jyutping: Nip6 Jyun5
- Website: nieyuan.net

Nie Yuan (born 17 March 1978) is a Chinese actor best known for his numerous television performances, some of his more notable roles include: Qi Tianlei in Wrong Carriage, Right Groom (2000); Hu Fei in Fox Volant of the Snowy Mountain (2006); Li Ke in Carol of Zhenguan (2007); Zhao Yun in Three Kingdoms (2010), Tang Sanzang in Journey to the West (2011) and Qianlong Emperor in Story of Yanxi Palace (2018).

== Early life ==
Nie was born in Zhenyuan County, Guizhou. His parents named his elder brother and him "Zhen" and "Yuan" respectively to remind them not to forget their hometown (Zhenyuan). When Nie recalled his adolescent days, he saw himself as a "youth-at-risk" then – he secretly joined the Guiyang Dance Class without informing his parents; when he was around 15 and 16 years old, he smoked, got into fights, and ran away from home. His worried parents sent him to enlist in the People's Liberation Army. Nie later enrolled in the Shanghai Theatre Academy after completing his service in the army. However, he behaved insolently in the academy and was almost expelled for poor conduct, but a teacher appealed for him to stay. After this incident, he became more mature and changed his rebellious ways.

== Career ==
Nie first started acting when he was still in the Shanghai Theatre Academy. He was a "highly productive" actor, as he described in his own words, "In times when I was playing with my life, I could finish filming one episode in two days. I tried completing filming a 140 episodes television drama and one movie in a year. This can be taken as a record."

In 2000, after graduating from the academy, Nie and his first girlfriend, actress Huang Yi, collaborated in the television drama Wrong Carriage, Right Groom. Nie did not receive much acclaim for his performance while in contrast, Huang Yi was very successful. In 2001, Nie worked on Tianxia Liangcang with director Wu Ziniu, and was noted for his outstanding performance. Following that, Nie acted in the period dramas Love Legend of the Tang Dynasty, Eternity: A Chinese Ghost Story, Heroes of Sui and Tang Dynasties, Hanxue Baoma, Jingcheng Sishao, Han Women, and Carol of Zhenguan, and experienced a surge in popularity for his portrayal of good-looking young men dressed in ancient Chinese costumes.

In 2004, Nie was named by the Chinese media as one of the "Mainland's New Four Young Actors", along with Huang Xiaoming, Tong Dawei and Yin Xiaotian. That year, producer Zhang Jizhong was searching for someone to portray the lead character Yang Guo in his wuxia television series The Return of the Condor Heroes. Nie was a popular choice for "Yang Guo" and he participated in the audition as well, but eventually lost the role to Huang Xiaoming, who was not as popular as him then. Huang Xiaoming's performance in The Return of the Condor Heroes propelled him to fame, while in contrast, Nie did not advance much in his career. It was said that Nie and Huang developed a rivalry over the incident, but in a 2010 interview, Nie admitted that he did feel depressed when he lost the opportunity to act as Yang Guo, but also stated that his feud with Huang Xiaoming is not true.

In 2006, Nie starred in the wuxia drama Fox Volant of the Snowy Mountain.

From 2008 onwards, Nie's career took an upturn when he starred in the television series Three Kingdoms (2010) as military general Zhao Yun and Journey to the West (2011) as Tang Sanzang, adaptations of two of the Four Great Classical Novels of Chinese literature. He then acted in the films The Flowers of War as a soldier, The Last Supper as military general Xiang Zhuang, Avalokitesvara as Tang Emperor Li Yi, and Brotherhood of Blades as an eunuch.

Nie gained renewed recognition with his portrayal of Qianlong Emperor in the hit palace dramas Story of Yanxi Palace.

He later starred as Lu Buwei in the historical drama The Legend of Haolan.

Nie participated in the period drama series "Legacy" which will premiere exclusively on WarnerMedia's regional streaming service HBO Go at an unspecified date later in 2021. "Legacy" is a 1920s-set drama that chronicles the lives of the wealthy Yi family and three sisters who vie to inherit their father's shopping mall business. In a time of upheaval and uncertainty, the three sisters set aside their differences to keep the business afloat and save their family.

== Personal life ==
When he was in his third year at Shanghai Theatre Academy, Nie met actress Huang Yi and started a relationship with her. They also acted together as a couple in the television drama Wrong Carriage, Right Groom. They broke up later as they pursued their respective careers.

Around 2003, Nie started a new relationship with Liu Yun, whom he first met when they were working together in the television series Hanxue Baoma. They were later paired up again in Dahan Jinguo (2004). Nie and Liu separated in 2006.

On September 28, 2008, Nie married actress Yang Guang. Their wedding was held in Beijing and more than 300 guests were invited. They divorced in 2012.

In early 2014, Nie married actress Qin Ziyue, who had a minor role in Journey to the West (2011). Their daughter was born on May 8 of that year.

== Filmography ==
=== Film ===
Year	English title	Chinese title	Role	Notes/Ref.
2000		滕王阁传奇	Wang Bo	Television film
2000		刀锋	Fang Xiao	Television film
2002	Ghosts	凶宅幽灵	Jiang Hongbin	
2004	Love Message	简讯一月追	Tan Qiang	Cameo
2005	The Road	芳香之旅	Liu Fendou	
2005	Abao's Story	阿宝的故事	Luo Wei	
2006	Hidden Tiger	卧虎	Policeman	
2006	Eastern Legend	东方海盗传奇	Young Tang Lang	Cameo
2007		大爱无垠	Zhu Yibing	
2007	Wonder Women	女人本色	Cheng Bicong	
2008	Fit Lover	爱情左灯右行	Wu Dawei	
2011	The Lost Bladesman	关云长	Han Fu	
2011	The Founding of a Party	建党伟业	Chen Qimei	
2012	The Flowers of War	金陵十三叉	Chinese soldier	
2012	The Last Supper	王的盛宴	Xiang Zhuang	
2013	Avalokitesvara	不肯去观音	Li Yi	
2013	Return the Money	啊朋友还钱	Lu Dajun	
2013	Target Locked	目标战	Lin Haonan	
2014	Brotherhood of Blades	绣春刀	Zhao Jingzhong	
2017	The Warriors	勇士	Yang Chengbin	
2017	96 Hours	生死96小时	Zhao Yong	
2018	The Blizzard	道高一丈	Song Chao	
2018	Phantom from the Deep	古墓兽影	Wu Kui	
2018	Endless Loop	黑暗迷宫		
2018	Chinese Peacekeeping Forces	中国蓝盔	Chen Guoqiang	
2019	For Love with You	一切如你		
2019	Spy Wolf Chameleon	碟狼之变色龙		
2019	Mao Zedong 1949	决胜时刻	Luo Ruiqing	
2019	Towards The River Glorious	打过长江去		

=== Television series ===
Year	English title	Chinese title	Role	Notes/Ref.
1998		百年浮沉	Pei Yexiang	
1999		嫂娘	Yunlin	
1999	Smart Kid	机灵小不懂	Zhengde Emperor	
1999	Love Letter	情书	Lü Bin	Cameo
2000	Wrong Carriage, Right Groom	上错花轿嫁对郎	Qi Tianlei	
2000		夏日恋语录	Dali	Cameo
2000		夺命网路	Xu Bo	Cameo; alternative title Ai Buxuyao Chengnuo (愛,不需要承諾)
2001		天下粮仓	Qianlong Emperor	
2001		如影随形	Zuo Xiaobing	Cameo
2001	Love Legend of the Tang Dynasty	大唐情史	Bianji	
2001		非常情网	Tian Jiang	
2001	Lü Bu and Diaochan	吕布与貂蝉	Cao Cao	Alternative title Diewu Tianya (蝶舞天涯)
2002	Four Marshals	四大名捕斗将军	Wuqing	
2002	The Eight Hilarious Gods	笑八仙	Da'erguai	
2002		军港之夜	Xiao Ming	
2003	Eternity: A Chinese Ghost Story	倩女幽魂	Qiye	
2003	Heroes of Sui and Tang Dynasties	隋唐英雄传	Luo Cheng	
2003	High Flying Songs of Tang Dynasty	大唐歌飞	An Qingxu	
2003		龙凤奇缘	Fu Jun	
2003	Life Concern	人命关天	Chen Tianhua	
2003		青天衙门	Lin Youqing	Cameo
2004		汗血宝马	Zhao Xizhu	
2004		京城四少	Tiedan	
2004	Han Women	大汉巾帼	Fu Shen	
2004		凌云壮志包青天	Wang Chao	Cameo
2004		谁主中原	Chongzhen Emperor	
2004	The 100th Bride	第100个新娘	Xiaogang	
2004	Carol of Zhenguan	贞观长歌	Li Ke	
2005	Eonian Hero	逐日英雄	Ouyang Hanqiang	
2005		殷商传奇	Zu Mawang	Cameo
2005	Leave like the Wind	像风一样离去	Fan Yifeng	
2006	Fox Volant of the Snowy Mountain	雪山飞狐	Hu Fei	
2006	Red Streamer	红幡	Zhang Ziqing	
2006	Met As Strangers, Once Acquainted	相逢何必曾相识	Zhou Xinyan	Cameo
2006	Ming Dynasty	大明天下	Mu Yunzhou	Cameo
2006	Drifting Life	人间浮沉	Wu Shu	
2006	Project A	A计划	young Tang Lang	Cameo
2006		男人的天堂	Zhong Shan	
2007		戴着面具跳舞	Suona	
2007	Flags of Our Fathers	父辈的旗帜	Zhong Hao	
2007		天下兄弟	Liu Dong	
2009	Shooting from Behind	枪声背后	Ye Zhenglong	
2010	Three Kingdoms	三国	Zhao Yun	
2010	Hi Neighbourhood	嗨！芳邻	Gardener	
2011	Journey to the West	西游记	Tang Sanzang	
2012	Sheath Knife	刀出鞘	Liu Yunxiang	
2014	Deng Xiaoping at History's Crossroads	历史转折中的邓小平		Cameo
2014		花红花火	Chen Sanpao	
2015	Flying Swords of Dragon Gate	龙门飞甲	Zhao Huai'an	
2015	The Legend of Xiaozhuang	大玉儿传奇	Hong Taiji	
2016	Will of Steel	心如铁	Long Ma	
2017		东方有大海	Deng Shichang	
2018	Hidden Dragon	潜·龙	Yang Youxin	
2018	Story of Yanxi Palace	延禧攻略	Qianlong Emperor	
2019	The Legend of Haolan	皓镧传	Lü Buwei	
2019	The Plough Department of Song Dynasty	大宋北斗司		Cameo
2019	Can't Hide The Sun	掩不住的阳光		
2019	The Listener	心灵法医	Ming Chuan	
2019	Yanxi Palace: Princess Adventures	金枝玉叶	Qianlong Emperor	
2020	Knock on the Happiness Door	幸福还会来敲门	Huang Zili	
2020	The Heritage	传家	Xi Weian	
2021		前行者	Tang Xianping	
2022	Left Right	亲爱的小孩	Xie Tianhua	
2022	The Wind Blows From Longxi	风起陇西	Feng Ying	
2022	Stories of Lion Rock Spirit	狮子山下的故事	Xie Fei	
2022		风云战国之枭雄	Tian Dan	
2022	Our Ten Years	我们这十年	Fang Xingui	
2023	Calming Waves	定风波	Su Shi	
2023	Only for Love	以爱为营	Guan Xiangcheng	
2024	She and Her Girls	山花烂漫时	Zhou Shanqun	
2024	Dark Night and Dawn	暗夜与黎明	Zheng Yang	

== Discography ==
=== Soundtrack appearances ===
English title	Chinese title	Notes
"Love You Til the End"	愛你愛到底	Theme song of Red Streamer; performed together with Hu Ke
Legend	傳說	Ending theme song of Fox Volant of the Snowy Mountain
"Whose Bride Are You"	你是誰的新娘	Opening theme song of Leave like the Wind

== Awards ==
Year	Award	Category	Nominated work	Result	Ref.
2009	12th Golden Phoenix Awards	Society Award	—N/a	Won	
2018	5th The Actors of China Award Ceremony	Best Actor (Web series)	Story of Yanxi Palace	Won	
