= Mao Zijun =

Chinese actor

- Born: Mao Zhijun (茅志君); December 31, 1986 (age 39); Shaoxing, Zhejiang, China
- Education: Zhejiang University of Finance and Economics
- Occupation: Actor
- Years active: 2009–present
- Agent(s): H&R Century Pictures

Mao Zijun (Chinese: 茅子俊, born 31 December 1986) is a Chinese actor.

== Career ==
Mao debuted in the 2009 television series Niang Qi and thereafter gained attention for his role as the 14th prince in the 2011 hit drama Palace. The same year, he won the "Best Supporting Actor" award at the Youku Television Awards for his performance in The Glamorous Imperial Concubine. Mao later gained more attention through his antagonist role in the fantasy action drama hit, Noble Aspirations. He gained further recognition with his supporting roles in The Glory of Tang Dynasty and The Destiny of White Snake.

Mao starred in his first lead role in the 2019 historical drama The Legend of Haolan, playing the Qin Emperor.

== Filmography ==
=== Film ===
Year	English title	Chinese title	Role	Notes/Ref.
2011	Shang Men Zhai	上门债	Wu Jiawei	
2012	Ripples of Desire	花漾	Sir Li	

=== Television series ===
Year	English title	Chinese title	Role	Notes/Ref.
2009	Niang Qi	娘妻	Ding Guohua	
2010	Pretty Maid	大丫鬟	Ah Lie	
2010	Beauty's Rival in Palace	美人心计	Liu Che	
2011	Palace	宫锁心玉	Yinti	
2011	The Coming and Going	船来船往	Zhang Shengzhong	
2011	The Glamorous Imperial Concubine	倾世皇妃	Ma Duyun	
2012	Jiu He Ru Hai	九河入海	Hai Zhongqi	
2013	Painted Skin 2	画皮之真爱无悔	Pang Lang	
2014	Wine Beauty	紅酒俏佳人	Zhao Xi	
2014	A Legend of Chinese Immortal	剑侠	Cao Gong	
2015	The Four	少年四大名捕	Tie Shou	
2015	A Scholar Dream of Woman	碧血书香梦	Wu Shi	
2015	The Last Battle	最后一战	Han Wenyu	
2016	Singing All Along	秀丽江山之长歌行	Yin Xing	
2016	Noble Aspirations	青云志	Qin Wuyan	
2016	Hope Mission	希望使命	Yue Gang	
2017	The Glory of Tang Dynasty	大唐荣耀	An Qingxu	
2017	Legend of Dragon Pearl	龙珠传奇	Zhu Cixuan	
2018	The Destiny of White Snake	天乩之白蛇传说	Qi Xiao	
2019	The Legend of Haolan	皓镧传	Ying Yiren	
2021	Gifted Dreamer	天生梦想家	Qin Chuan	
2021	Hen Jun Bu Si Jiang Lou Yue	恨君不似江楼月	Jiang Yuelou	
2024	Melody of Golden Age	长乐曲	Lai Luo Zhi	

=== Television show ===
Year	English title	Chinese title	Role	Notes
2017	I Want to Meet You	我想见到你	Cast member	

== Awards and nominations ==
Year	Award	Category	Nominated work	Result	Ref.
2011	Youku Television Awards	Best Supporting Actor	The Glamorous Imperial Concubine	Won	
2012	Asian Idol Awards	Media Recommended Newcomer	—N/a	Won	
2017	Only Lady Fashion Awards	Most Popular Actor	—N/a	Won	
2017	iFensi Awards	Most Popular Actor	—N/a	Won	
2017	24th Cosmo Beauty Ceremony	Beautiful Idol	—N/a	Won	
2019	2nd Modern Night Out	Most Popular Young Actor	—N/a	Won	
2019	OK! The Style Awards	Most Loved Trend Actor	—N/a	Won	
