= Dong Zhen =

Chinese singer-songwriter and lyricist

- Born: 27 August 1986 (age 39); Sanming, Fujian, China
- Occupations: Singer-songwriter, lyricist
- Years active: 2006–present

Chinese name
- Traditional Chinese: 董貞
- Simplified Chinese: 董贞
Transcriptions
Standard Mandarin
- Hanyu Pinyin: Dǒng Zhēn
- Musical career
- Labels: 金凯盛唱片; 北京娱乐通; 树良品文化

Dong Zhen (born 27 August 1986) is a Chinese singer-songwriter and lyricist best known for performing the theme songs of many Chinese MMORPGs, including The Legend of Sword and Fairy series, Jade Dynasty and Zu Online.

== Career ==
Dong graduated from the Communication University of China. After her graduation, she went to pursue her career as a singer with the Beijing Musical Organisation (北京音樂圈). In 2006, Dong was a judge at the auditions of the Woxing Woxiu (我型我秀) reality television show, jointly organised by UMG and SMG. She also participated in the 2009 Super Girl (2009快樂女聲) contest and was one of the top 300 finalists from all over China.

Dong is best known for performing the theme songs of several Chinese MMORPGs, including The Legend of Sword and Fairy series, Jade Dynasty and Zu Online, as well as for some television series and commercials. She is the first singer to use the Zhongguo Feng (中國風) style (a form of modern Chinese music which fuses traditional instruments and styles with R&B or rock) for theme songs from video games. Dong also writes lyrics for songs by other singers, including Jang Na-ra and Jeong Jae-yeon. She released a total of six albums from 2007 to 2011.

== Discography ==
=== Albums ===
==== Zhen Ai Yi Hui ====
Album information	Track	Notes
Title: 贞爱一回 (Zhen Ai Yi Hui); Release date: 13 August 2007; Label: 金凯盛唱片	轻轻的告诉你 (Qing Qing De Gao Su Ni)	
Title: 贞爱一回 (Zhen Ai Yi Hui); Release date: 13 August 2007; Label: 金凯盛唱片	醉美天下 (Zui Mei Tian Xia)	
Title: 贞爱一回 (Zhen Ai Yi Hui); Release date: 13 August 2007; Label: 金凯盛唱片	你潇洒我漂亮 (Ni Xiao Sa Wo Piao Liang)	
Title: 贞爱一回 (Zhen Ai Yi Hui); Release date: 13 August 2007; Label: 金凯盛唱片	让泪化作相思雨 (Rang Lei Hua Zuo Xiang Si Yu)	
Title: 贞爱一回 (Zhen Ai Yi Hui); Release date: 13 August 2007; Label: 金凯盛唱片	梦里水乡 (Meng Li Shui Xiang)	
Title: 贞爱一回 (Zhen Ai Yi Hui); Release date: 13 August 2007; Label: 金凯盛唱片	有一种爱叫做放手 (You Yi Zhong Ai Jiao Zuo Fang Shou)	
Title: 贞爱一回 (Zhen Ai Yi Hui); Release date: 13 August 2007; Label: 金凯盛唱片	缘 (Yuan)	
Title: 贞爱一回 (Zhen Ai Yi Hui); Release date: 13 August 2007; Label: 金凯盛唱片	心在跳情在烧 (Xin Zai Tiao Qing Zai Shao)	
Title: 贞爱一回 (Zhen Ai Yi Hui); Release date: 13 August 2007; Label: 金凯盛唱片	同桌的你 (Tong Zhuo De Ni)	
Title: 贞爱一回 (Zhen Ai Yi Hui); Release date: 13 August 2007; Label: 金凯盛唱片	该死的温柔 (Gai Si De Wen Rou)	
Title: 贞爱一回 (Zhen Ai Yi Hui); Release date: 13 August 2007; Label: 金凯盛唱片	粉红色的回忆 (Fen Hong Se De Hui Yi)	
Title: 贞爱一回 (Zhen Ai Yi Hui); Release date: 13 August 2007; Label: 金凯盛唱片	爱如空气 (Ai Ru Kong Qi)	

==== Tui Bian ====
Album information	Track	Notes
Title: 蜕变 (Tui Bian); Release date: 29 July 2008	诛仙·情醉 (Zhu Xian – Qing Zui)	Performed with Cui Yan (崔岩), Theme from Jade Dynasty
Title: 蜕变 (Tui Bian); Release date: 29 July 2008	绿蔷薇 (Lü Qiang Wei)	
Title: 蜕变 (Tui Bian); Release date: 29 July 2008	美人浴 (Mei Ren Yu)	
Title: 蜕变 (Tui Bian); Release date: 29 July 2008	你不在秋天 (Ni Bu Zai Qiu Tian)	

==== Diao Hua Long ====
Album information	Track	Notes
Title: 雕花笼 (Diao Hua Long); Release date: 10 January 2009; Label: 北京娱乐通	雕花笼 (Diao Hua Long)	Theme from Xin Juedai Shuangjiao Zhi Yu Xi Jianghu (新绝代双骄之鱼戏江湖)
Title: 雕花笼 (Diao Hua Long); Release date: 10 January 2009; Label: 北京娱乐通	雕花笼(合声伴奏版) (Diao Hua Long He Sheng Ban Zou Ban)	Diao Hua Long choral and accompaniment version
Title: 雕花笼 (Diao Hua Long); Release date: 10 January 2009; Label: 北京娱乐通	雕花笼(伴奏版) (Diao Hua Long Ban Zou Ban)	Diao Hua Long accompaniment version

==== Fan Pu Gui Zhen ====
Album information	Track	Notes
Title: 返璞归贞 (Fan Pu Gui Zhen); Release date: 27 August 2009; Label: 树良品文化	返璞归贞 (Fan Pu Gui Zhen)	
Title: 返璞归贞 (Fan Pu Gui Zhen); Release date: 27 August 2009; Label: 树良品文化	相思引 (Xiang Si Yin)	Theme from Jade Dynasty
Title: 返璞归贞 (Fan Pu Gui Zhen); Release date: 27 August 2009; Label: 树良品文化	金缕衣 (Jin Lü Yi)	
Title: 返璞归贞 (Fan Pu Gui Zhen); Release date: 27 August 2009; Label: 树良品文化	雕花笼 (Diao Hua Long)	Theme from Xin Juedai Shuangjiao Zhi Yu Xi Jianghu
Title: 返璞归贞 (Fan Pu Gui Zhen); Release date: 27 August 2009; Label: 树良品文化	仙恋 (Xian Lian)	Theme from Zu Online
Title: 返璞归贞 (Fan Pu Gui Zhen); Release date: 27 August 2009; Label: 树良品文化	追梦人 (Zhui Meng Ren)	
Title: 返璞归贞 (Fan Pu Gui Zhen); Release date: 27 August 2009; Label: 树良品文化	情醉 (Qing Zui)	Performed with Cui Yan (崔岩); Theme from Jade Dynasty
Title: 返璞归贞 (Fan Pu Gui Zhen); Release date: 27 August 2009; Label: 树良品文化	刀剑如梦 (Dao Jian Ru Meng)	
Title: 返璞归贞 (Fan Pu Gui Zhen); Release date: 27 August 2009; Label: 树良品文化	回到起点 (Hui Dao Qi Dian)	Insert theme from The Legend of Sword and Fairy 4
Title: 返璞归贞 (Fan Pu Gui Zhen); Release date: 27 August 2009; Label: 树良品文化	美人浴 (Mei Ren Yu)	
Title: 返璞归贞 (Fan Pu Gui Zhen); Release date: 27 August 2009; Label: 树良品文化	新鸳鸯蝴蝶梦 (Xin Yuan Yang Hu Die Meng)	
Title: 返璞归贞 (Fan Pu Gui Zhen); Release date: 27 August 2009; Label: 树良品文化	逍遥游 (Xiao Yao You)	Theme from Xin Juedai Shuangjiao Qianzhuan (新絕代雙驕前傳)
Title: 返璞归贞 (Fan Pu Gui Zhen); Release date: 27 August 2009; Label: 树良品文化	你不在秋天 (Ni Bu Zai Qiu Tian)	
Title: 返璞归贞 (Fan Pu Gui Zhen); Release date: 27 August 2009; Label: 树良品文化	金缕衣(伴奏) (Jin Lü Yi Ban Zou)	Jin Lü Yi accompaniment version
Title: 返璞归贞 (Fan Pu Gui Zhen); Release date: 27 August 2009; Label: 树良品文化	半月琴(笛子版) (Ban Yue Qin Di Zi Ban)	Flute piece

==== Zhen Jiang Hu ====
Album information	Track	Notes
Title: 贞江湖 (Zhen Jiang Hu); Release date: 27 August 2010; Label: 树良品文化	剑如虹 (Jian Ru Hong)	Theme from Jiansheng OL (剑圣OL)
Title: 贞江湖 (Zhen Jiang Hu); Release date: 27 August 2010; Label: 树良品文化	湖畔 (Hu Pan)	
Title: 贞江湖 (Zhen Jiang Hu); Release date: 27 August 2010; Label: 树良品文化	墨魂 (Mo Hun)	
Title: 贞江湖 (Zhen Jiang Hu); Release date: 27 August 2010; Label: 树良品文化	沧海一声笑 (Cang Hai Yi Sheng Xiao)	Theme from The Swordsman
Title: 贞江湖 (Zhen Jiang Hu); Release date: 27 August 2010; Label: 树良品文化	月光 (Yue Guang)	Theme from The Legend of Qin (animated TV series)
Title: 贞江湖 (Zhen Jiang Hu); Release date: 27 August 2010; Label: 树良品文化	蜀绣 (Shu Xiu)	
Title: 贞江湖 (Zhen Jiang Hu); Release date: 27 August 2010; Label: 树良品文化	梅花三弄 (Mei Hua San Nong)	
Title: 贞江湖 (Zhen Jiang Hu); Release date: 27 August 2010; Label: 树良品文化	千年泪 (Qian Nian Lei)	
Title: 贞江湖 (Zhen Jiang Hu); Release date: 27 August 2010; Label: 树良品文化	逍遥叹 (Xiao Yao Tan)	Insert theme from Chinese Paladin
Title: 贞江湖 (Zhen Jiang Hu); Release date: 27 August 2010; Label: 树良品文化	鸳鸯锦 (Yuan Yang Jin)	
Title: 贞江湖 (Zhen Jiang Hu); Release date: 27 August 2010; Label: 树良品文化	心如蝶舞 (Xin Ru Die Wu)	Theme from The Butterfly Lovers
Title: 贞江湖 (Zhen Jiang Hu); Release date: 27 August 2010; Label: 树良品文化	世上岂有神仙哉 (Shi Shang Qi You Shen Xian Zai)	Insert theme from The Legend of Sword and Fairy 4

==== Jiu Yin Zhen Jing ====
Album information	Track	Notes
Title: 九阴贞经 (Jiu Yin Zhen Jing); Release date: 1 November 2011; Label: 树良品文化	问剑 (Wen Jian)	
Title: 九阴贞经 (Jiu Yin Zhen Jing); Release date: 1 November 2011; Label: 树良品文化	剑起苍澜 (Jian Qi Cang Lan)	
Title: 九阴贞经 (Jiu Yin Zhen Jing); Release date: 1 November 2011; Label: 树良品文化	幽狐 (You Hu)	
Title: 九阴贞经 (Jiu Yin Zhen Jing); Release date: 1 November 2011; Label: 树良品文化	御剑江湖 (Yu Jian Jiang Hu)	
Title: 九阴贞经 (Jiu Yin Zhen Jing); Release date: 1 November 2011; Label: 树良品文化	情花 (Qing Hua)	
Title: 九阴贞经 (Jiu Yin Zhen Jing); Release date: 1 November 2011; Label: 树良品文化	梦幻修仙 (Meng Huan Xiu Xian)	
Title: 九阴贞经 (Jiu Yin Zhen Jing); Release date: 1 November 2011; Label: 树良品文化	醉梦仙霖 (Zui Meng Xian Lin)	
Title: 九阴贞经 (Jiu Yin Zhen Jing); Release date: 1 November 2011; Label: 树良品文化	天净沙·秋思 (Tian Jing Sha – Qiu Si)	
Title: 九阴贞经 (Jiu Yin Zhen Jing); Release date: 1 November 2011; Label: 树良品文化	重阳 (Chong Yang)	

=== Original singles ===
Track	Notes
亲口说爱你 (Qin Kou Shuo Ai Ni)	
呼吸 (Hu Xi)	
半月琴DEMO·回到起点前版 (Ban Yue Qin DEMO – Hui Dao Qi Dian Qian Ban)	
我们在一起 (Wo Men Zai Yi Qi)	Fan song from Dong Zhen's website
世上岂有神仙哉·祭夙玉 (Shi Shang Qi You Shen Xian Zai – Ji Su Yu)	Insert theme from The Legend of Sword and Fairy 4
情殇·琴殇 (Qing Shang – Qin Shang)	Theme from The Legend of Sword and Fairy 4
情梦孤祭·峨嵋金顶 (Qing Meng Gu Ji – E Mei Jin Ding)	Insert theme from Zu Online
牵绊·缚思 (Qian Ban – Fu Si)	Theme from Zi Sha CP (紫纱CP)
返璞归贞之烟雨江南 (Fan Pu Gui Zhen Zhi Yan Yu Jiang Nan)	Lyrics version
缘碎 (Yuan Sui)	Performed with Sheng Wei (盛威); Insert theme from Jade Dynasty; Alternate version of Qing Zui
天净沙·秋思 (Tian Jing Sha – Qiu Si)	
墨魂 (Mo Hun)	
湖畔DEMO (Hu Pan DEMO)	
曾经的约定DEMO·西游天下 (Ceng Jing De Yue Ding DEMO – Xi You Tian Xia)	
誓言 (Shi Yan)	Insert theme from Xin Juedai Shuangjiao Qianzhuan
出发 (Chu Fa)	Theme from Fantasia Sango 3
自由的风 (Zi You De Feng)	Theme from Kou Dai Xi You (口袋西游)
三世缘 (San Shi Yuan)	Theme from Hong Lou Meng: Lin Dai Yu Yu Bei Jing Yu (红楼梦:林黛玉与北静玉)
红颜绝唱 (Hong Yan Jue Chang)	Theme from Yu Jian Jiang Hu (御剑江湖)
醉梦仙霖 (Zui Meng Xian Lin)	Insert theme from The Legend of Sword and Fairy 4
爱殇 (Ai Shang)	Interlude theme from The Journey of Flower (花千骨)
自由之战 (Zi You Zhi Zhan)	Theme from Ying Xiong Dao (英雄岛)
了结 (Liao Jie)	Insert theme from Swordsman
上元 (Shang Yuan)	Specially created for the 2014 Lantern Festival
倚天剑雨 (Yi Tian Jian Yu)	
九鼎天下 (Jiu Ding Tian Xia)	
传说 (Chuan Shuo)	
白素贞 (Bai Su Zhen)	
梦太晚 (Meng Tai Wan)	Ending theme from The Legend of Qin (animated TV series)
花想容 (Hua Xiang Rong)	
兰夜 (Lan Ye)	
她 (Ta)	

=== Vocals ===
Track	Notes
誓言 (Shi Yan)	
画心 (Hua Xin)	
人鱼传说 (Ren Yu Chuan Shuo)	
爱殇 (Ai Shang)	
帝国柔情 (Di Guo Rou Qing)	
古剑奇谭·幽夜苍茫 (Gu Jian Qi Tan – You Ye Cang Mang)	

=== Duets ===
Track	Notes
游戏世界的守候 (You Xi Shi Jie De Shou Hou)	Performed with Xiaoxu Game Musical Group (小旭游戏音乐团队); Dedicated to the victims of the 2008 Sichuan earthquake
飞羽 (Fei Yu)	Theme from Meng Huan Zhu Xian (梦幻诛仙); Performed with Cui Yan (崔岩)
风碑 (Feng Bei)	Performed with Xiaoke (小柯); Theme from Jian Xia Shi Jie (剑侠世界)
当我开始偷偷爱你 (Dang Wo Kai Shi Tou Tou Ai Ni)	Performed with Lei Nuo'er (雷诺尔)
江湖 (Jiang Hu)	Performed with Sheng Wei (盛威)
无端相忆 (Wu Duan Xiang Yi)	Performed with Liu Haolin (刘昊霖)
侠客行 (Xia Ke Xing)	Performed with Xu Nuo (许诺)

=== Non original singles ===
Track	Notes
甜蜜蜜 (Tian Mi Mi)	
笑红尘 (Xiao Hong Chen)	Theme from Swordsman II
画心 (Hua Xin)	Theme from Painted Skin
俩俩相望 (Liang Liang Xiang Wang)	Theme from The Heaven Sword and Dragon Saber
爱你 (Ai Ni)	
月光 (Yue Guang)	Theme from The Legend of Qin (animated TV series)
功夫 (Gong Fu)	
约翰 (Yue Han)	
樱花季 (Ying Hua Ji)	
爱上你全部 (Ai Shang Ni Quan Bu)	
爱的天国 (Ai De Tian Guo)	
朱砂泪 (Zhu Sha Lei)	
仙剑赋 (Xian Jian Fu)	Fan song for The Legend of Sword and Fairy; Music by Wo Ai Xiao Kui (我爱小葵)
青衫隐 (Qing Shan Yin)	
梅花三弄 (Mei Hua San Nong)	
回梦游仙·寻仙 (Hui Meng Xian You – Xun Xian)	Insert theme from The Legend of Sword and Fairy 4
走得很安静 (Zou De Hen An Jing)	Tribute to Taiwanese singer Ah Sang (阿桑), who died on 6 April 2009; Based on Ah Sang's Yi Zhi Hen An Jing (一直很安静); Theme from Chinese Paladin
心如蝶舞·剑蝶 (Xin Ru Die Wu – Jian Die)	Theme from The Butterfly Lovers
云笙叹 (Yun Sheng Tan)	Theme from Sword of Xuanyuan
Jingle Bell Rock	
人鱼传说之人鱼之恋 (Ren Yu Chuan Shuo Zhi Ren Yu Zhi Lian)	Theme from Wanmei Shijie Qianzhuan Renyu Chuanshuo (完美世界前传人鱼传说)
情缠 (Qing Chan)	Theme from The Legend of Sword and Fairy
千年泪 (Qian Nian Lei)	Ending theme from The Little Fairy
