= Stage of Youth =

- 青春舞台
- Genre: Drama
- Starring: Han Geng; Huang Yi; Joey Yung
- Opening theme: 青春梦想》(Dreams of Youth) - Han Geng
- Country of origin: China
- Original language: Mandarin Chinese
- No. of episodes: 12

Production
- Running time: Daily

Original release
- Network: CCTV2

Stage of Youth (Chinese: 青春舞台, pinyin: Qing Chun Wu Tai) is a 12-episode Chinese drama that first aired on January 26, 2009 on CCTV2 as a tribute to the 2008 Summer Olympics. It is also the first lead role for Super Junior member Han Geng, who was an official torch bearer.

== Storyline ==
Xia Lei (Han Geng) is a young man who loves to dance. His father is a top archery athlete and since Xia Lei's mother died, had missed the opportunity to compete in the last Olympics. His father wants him to follow in his footsteps. Yet, Xia Lei only has a passion for dancing. After going through conflicts with his father, meeting constant tribulation and challenges, and gaining determination, he finally reached his dreams and becomes a new generation of dancing star.

== Cast ==
- Han Geng - Xia Lei (夏磊)
- Huang Yi - Tian Mo Mo (田默默)
- Joey Yung - Shen Z - Rainie Yang
- Yumiko Cheng - Shen Su Cai (申素彩)
- Kenny Kwan - A-Bo
- Johnny Zhang - Ding Xiao
- Kim Ryeowook - Xiu Lo
- Other Super Junior-M members - (cameo)
