= Wrong Carriage, Right Groom =

- 上错花轿嫁对郎
- Genre: costume, romance, comedy
- Created by: Xi Juan
- Directed by: Zhang Zien
- Starring: Huang Yi; Nie Yuan; Li Lin; Shi Xiaohong
- Theme music composer: Lei Lei
- Opening theme: "A Clever Marriage Made In Heaven - 巧解姻缘天作合 " by Ren Zhen
- Ending theme: "Singing in the Rain in Yangzhou - 烟雨唱扬州" by Li Shu
- Composers: Lei Lei; Zhang Zien
- Country of origin: China
- Original language: Mandarin
- No. of seasons: 1
- No. of episodes: 20

Production
- Executive producer: Tang Daxiang
- Producers: Zhang Chunlin; Huang Jiazuo
- Production location: China
- Editor: Liu Yang
- Camera setup: Yan Junsheng
- Running time: 43 minutes/episode
- Production company: Anhui Television

Original release
- Network: CCTV
- Release: 19 March – 2 April 2001

Related
- Wrong Carriage, Right Groom (2022)

Wrong Carriage, Right Groom (Chinese: 上错花轿嫁对郎; pinyin: Shàng cuò huājiào jià duì láng) is a Chinese television series that produced 20 episodes in September 2000 with the participation of Huang Yi, Nie Yuan, Li Lin, Shi Xiaohong. The drama is adapted from the novel of the same name and the work "Please Just Wait A Moment" (请你将就一下) by writer Taiwanese Xi Juan (席絹). The drama was officially broadcast on March 19, 2001.

== Plot ==
The drama tells an interesting story about two Yangzhou beauties women from the Tang dynasty who got into the wrong wedding carriage but each had a happy marriage. Li Yuhu and Du Bingyan were to get married on the same day. Li Yuhu was supposed to marry General Yuan Buqu, while Du Bingyan was to marry the wealthy but sickly third young master Qi Tianlei. Because Li Yuhu's father was the owner of a martial arts school, he hoped that his daughter would not be inferior to the Du family in holding the wedding ceremony. The Li family also deliberately departed before the Du family to save face. Because of the rain, the two brides' carriages had to stay in the Temple of Fairies. In the chaos of hearing that there was a gang attack, both of them mistakenly put on their red veil and got into the wrong carriage. Du Bingyan mistakenly married Yuan Buqu and later made great contributions in the army; Li Yuhu married Qi Tianlei, together with him "exorcised evil spirits" in the family civil war and won.

Through a series of trials and tribulations, the newly paired couples grow to love each other. As they say, “it’s fine to get on the wrong bridal carriage so long as you don't marry the wrong person.”

== Cast ==
=== Main cast ===
- Huang Yi as Li Yuhu
- Li Lin as Du Bingyan
- Nie Yuan as Qi Tianlei
- Shi Xiaohong as Yuan Buqu

=== Supporting cast ===
- Zheng Yuzhi as Old Lady Qi
- Xu Guang as Ke Shizhao
- Sha Yi as Sha Pingwei
- Chen Jiayan as Fang Qiaoxiao
- Cui Yi as Xiaoxi
- Liu Peiqing as Liu Ruoqian
- Wang Jinghua as Shu Xiuyun
- Xu Jingling as Qi Yansheng
- Liu Xinhan as Ji Jingtang
- Juan Zi as Changping Princess
- Zhang Tielin as Emperor Taizong of Tang
- Lu Hanbiao as Kong County Magistrate
- Wang Gang as Wang Huzi
- Liu Gang as Bookboy
- Li Xiao as Mei Xiang
- Ye Junlin as Matchmaker Lin
- Meng Danfeng as Matchmaker Zhang
- Wu Mingzhen as Lady Qi
- Wang Yaming as Second Lady
- Li Liansheng as Eunuch Zhang

== Theme songs ==
- Opening song: A Clever Marriage Made In Heaven - 巧解姻缘天作合
  - Lyrics: Zhang Zien, Tong Bian
  - Composer: Lei Lei
  - Singer: Ren Zhen
- Ending song: Misty Rain Sings Yangzhou - 烟雨唱扬州
  - Lyrics: Zhang Zien, Tong Bian
  - Composer: Lei Lei
  - Singer: Li Shu
- Music production: A Luo Studio
