= Knock on the Happiness Door =

- Also known as: Knock on the Happiness Door

Chinese name
- Traditional Chinese: 辛福還會來敲門
- Simplified Chinese: 幸福还会来敲门
Transcriptions
Standard Mandarin
- Hanyu Pinyin: Xìngfú hái huì lái qiāo mén
- Genre: Romance, Drama
- Directed by: Yan Po
- Starring: Wu Jinyan; Nie Yuan; Qian Yongchen; Mao Junjie; Guo Jiaming; Li Chengyuan
- Country of origin: China
- Original language: Mandarin
- No. of episodes: 44

Production
- Executive producer: Liu Sisi

Original release
- Network: iQIYI
- Release: August 12 – September 4, 2020

Knock on the Happiness Door (Chinese: 幸福还会来敲门) is a 2020 Chinese television series starring Wu Jinyan and Nie Yuan. The series is broadcast on Zhejiang TV, Jiangsu TV, iQIYI, Tencent Video and Youku on August 12 to September 4, 2020. The story is about a doctor Huang Zili experiences the distress of love relationship and career. Because of some accidents, he becomes the help target of the civilian police, Fang Yan. With her help, he regains his confidence and overcame the trough.

== Synopsis ==
Huang Zili hits rock bottom after experiencing the loss of family and career. Facing sorrow and confusion, he becomes a frequent visitor at the police station. Fang Yan is a hardworking civilian police and her dream is being a criminal police. In the road of pursuing her dream, she plans a list of target people in the community. One of the targets is Huang Zili. At last, Huang Zili can struggle in the face of hardship and transform into a mature man. He takes care of his father-in-law and his son, who are left by his ex-wife. The drama is full of comedy and warmth in order to express the values of life. It conveys positive energy and happiness to audience.

== Cast ==
=== Main ===
- Nie Yuan as Huang Zili / Doctor
  - Huang Zili is a doctor originally. He loses his job because he is framed by his colleagues in a medical incident. At the same time, he divorces his wife due to the blood relation of their son. He has a heavy strike on his life and he is a frequent visitor at the police station, becoming a help target of Fang Yan.
- Wu Jinyan as Fang Yan / Civilian Police
  - As a descendant of the police, she is a kind, capable and honest person. She wants to be a criminal police officer, but she becomes a civilian police officer under the persuasion of her family. She takes her work actively and seriously, and is patient and gentle in treating the unprivileged people in the community. After Huang Zili accidentally becomes her help target, she helps Huang Zili to overcome his difficulties.

=== Supporting ===
- Qian Yongchen as Wang Junyi
  - Wang Junyi works in the same hospital as Huang Zili. He is jealous the success of Huang Zili. They often have conflicts. In a medical incident, Huang Zili is framed by him and he loses his job.
- Mao Junjie as Liu Manyu
  - Liu Manyu is a rich, smart and strong woman. In a meeting about medical cooperation with a hospital leader, she meets Huang Zili, who is selling medical equipment. They start to develop a romantic relationship on online dating.
- Guo Jiaming as Huang Ziqiang
  - Huang Ziqiang is Huang Zili's younger brother. He comes to the city to earn a living. After Huang Zili leaves the hospital, he becomes a restaurant chef and makes a girlfriend. During Huang Zili's most difficult and mourning period, Huang Ziqiang always supports and encourages him.
- Li Chengyuan as Zhong Qing
  - Zhong Qing is Huang Zili's wife and works in the same hospital as him. They originally have a stable relationship and get divorce after giving birth because of a series of misunderstandings. A few years later, she accidentally meets her ex-husband Huang Zili and his current girlfriend, Liu Manyu.

== Production ==
The series was filmed from August 19, 2019 to November 26, 2019.
