= Wu Jinyan =

Chinese actress (born 1990)

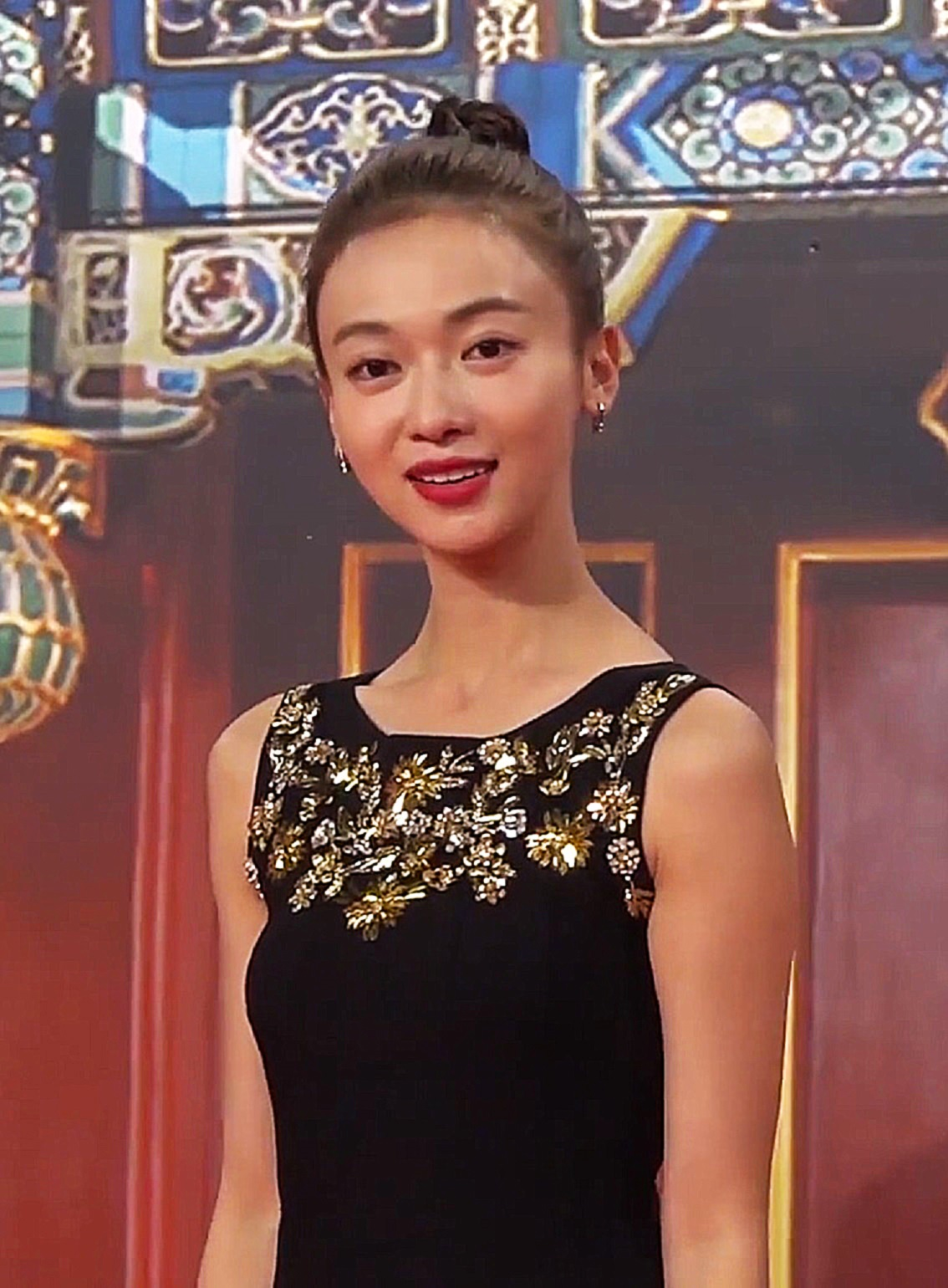
- Wu in 2018
- Born: August 16, 1990 (age 36); Chengdu, Sichuan, China
- Education: Beijing Film Academy
- Occupation: Actress
- Years active: 2010–present
- Agent: Huanyu Entertainment
- Spouse: Hong Yao (m. 2024)

Chinese name
- Traditional Chinese: 吳謹言
- Simplified Chinese: 吴谨言
Transcriptions
Standard Mandarin
- Hanyu Pinyin: Wú Jǐnyán

Wu Jinyan (Chinese: 吴谨言, born August 16, 1990) is a Chinese actress. She is best known for her roles in television series Beauties at the Crossfire (2013), Story of Yanxi Palace (2018), The Legend of Haolan (2019), and The Double (2024).

== Early life and education ==
Wu was born in Chengdu, Sichuan. She began studying ballet at the age of 3. In 2000, she moved from her hometown to train at the Dance School Affiliated to Beijing Dance Academy, working to become a professional ballerina. After 7 years of boarding school, Wu joined the National Ballet of China, where she suffered repeated fractures in her feet. Wu later reported that these injuries caused her to pursue a different career to ballet. (Note: Appearing on Very quiet distance (非常静距离) on March 30, 2019, Wu described her early life and career.) In 2009, Wu entered Beijing Film Academy, majoring in acting.

At the Affiliated school, Wu once had a chance to become an actress. The director even invited Wu's parents to persuade her to participate. But the role needed to shave the head, which would affect the dance presentation, she finally gave up this opportunity.

== Career ==
=== 2010–2017: Beginnings ===
During Wu's sophomore year, she began her career by taking part in filming a time-travel television series, which has not been aired yet. (Note: In an interview released by China News Service on February 2, 2019, Wu disclosed that her first work, the television series shot during her sophomore, has not been aired.)

In 2011, Wu signed a contract with Zijun Entertainment, which opened up more acting opportunities for her.

In 2013, Wu played a dual role in the period political drama Beauties at the Crossfire, which achieved the highest ratings of the year for Anhui TV. She also got the nomination of Most Popular Actress at the Shanghai Television Festival.

In 2015, she appeared in the Guan Hu's crime film Mr. Six as a college student begging money to go home, opposite Feng Xiaogang.

In 2016, during the shooting of Waitan Zhong Sheng, Wu made acquaintance with Yu Zheng, a Chinese screenwriter and producer. (Note: Appearing on Very quiet distance (非常静距离) on March 30, 2019, Wu told her story how she made acquaintance with Yu Zheng.) Then she became an artist of Huanyu Entertainment and was cast as the lead role in the historical drama Zhaoge.

=== 2018–present: Rising popularity ===
In 2018, Wu starred in the historical drama Story of Yanxi Palace. The drama was incredibly popular in China and throughout Asia, streaming over 15 billion times and becoming the most googled show in 2018. Wu gained increased attention and popularity with her role as Wei Yingluo. She gained increased attention after starring in historical fiction The Legend of Haolan (2019) as Li Haolan / Zhao Ji.

In 2019, Wu joined the cast of Youth Periplous, a Chinese variety show broadcast on Zhejiang Television. In August, she ranked 65th on Forbes China Celebrity 100 list. In September, Wu portrayed a scriptwriter in the suspense romance drama You Are My Answer which aired on Hunan Television. In October, Wu appeared in the 2019 edition of Forbes 30 Under 30 China list, which consisted of 30 influential people under 30 years old who have had a substantial effect in their fields.

On January 1, 2020, Wu starred in a music video for JJ Lin's song titled The Story of Us (Chinese: 将故事写成我们). Wu was invited by JJ Lin to participate in the music video after the popularity of Story of Yanxi Palace. This was her first music video. The spin-off of Story of Yanxi Palace, Yanxi Palace: Princess Adventures, where Wu reprised her role as consort Wei Yingluo, aired on Netflix one day before.

Wu participated in the period drama series Legacy which will premiere exclusively on WarnerMedia's regional streaming service HBO Go at an unspecified date later in 2021. Legacy is a 1920s-set drama that chronicles the lives of the wealthy Yi family and three sisters who vie to inherit their father's shopping mall business. In a time of upheaval and uncertainty, the three sisters set aside their differences to keep the business afloat and save their family.

== Personal life ==
=== Marriage ===
On September 13, 2024, Wu posted a marriage registration photo with actor Hong Yao on Weibo, while Hong also posted the same.

== Filmography ==
=== Film ===
Year	English title	Chinese title	Role	Notes
2011	The Law of Attraction	万有引力	Huang Juan	
2015	Mr. Six	老炮儿	Zheng Hong	
2018	Forever Young	无问西东	Lin Huiyin	
2018	Born to Be Wild	说走就走之不说再见	Xue Qi	

=== Television series ===
Year	English title	Chinese title	Role	Notes
N/A		古今六人行	Mao Mao	Unaired
2012		青海花儿	Wu Xiaoyu	
2013		屏风美人	Qing Qing	Television film
2013	New Editorial Department Story	新编辑部故事	Young Lady	Episode 13
2013	Beauties at the Crossfire	烽火佳人	Qing Ping / Hong Yu	
2014	The Four	少年四大名捕	He Xiaoyu	Cameo
2014	Young Sherlock	少年神探狄仁杰	Li Qian	
2015	Royal Romance	多情江山	Wan'er	
2015	Fighting	激战	Jiang Ziyun	
2016	Singing All Along	秀丽江山之长歌行	Xu Yanzhi	
2016	The Flame of Youth	尖锋之烈焰青春	Bei Batian	
2016	Magnificent Sword with Beauty	美人如玉剑如虹	Mei Ting	
2017	Guardian of Beauty	守护丽人	Zhu Qiqi	
2017	Head Above Water	守卫者-浮出水面	Mi Xiaoran	
2017	Legend of Heavenly Tear: Phoenix Warriors	天泪传奇之凤凰无双	Ya Meiren	
N/A	Zhaoge	朝歌	Daji / Yue Hao / You Ji	Unaired
2018	Untouchable Lovers	凤囚凰	Feng Ting	
2018	Story of Yanxi Palace	延禧攻略	Wei Yingluo	
2018	Waitan Zhong Sheng	外滩钟声	Du Xinmei	
2019	The Legend of Haolan	皓镧传	Li Haolan (Zhao Ji)	
2019	You Are My Answer	你是我的答案	Bai Xiaolu	
2019	Yanxi Palace: Princess Adventures	金枝玉叶	Wei Yingluo	
2020	Knock on the Happiness Door	幸福还会来敲门	Fang Yan	
2020	Something Just Like This	青春创世纪	Qian Xixi	
2021	Fighting Youth	正青春	Zhang Xiaoyu	
2021	My Bargain Queen	我的砍价女王	Xia Qian	
2022	Royal Feast	尚食	Yao Zijin	
2022	Legacy	传家	Yi Zhongyu	
2024	The Double	墨雨云间	Xue Fangfei / Jiang Li	
2024	Kill Me Love Me	春花焰	Mei Lin	
TBA	Shanghai Picked Flowers	十里洋场拾年花	Yao Li	
TBA	Morning The Imperial Palace	早安故宮	Yang Wan	Guest

=== Variety show ===
Year	English title	Chinese title	Role	Notes
2019	Youth Periplous	青春环游记	Cast member	

=== Music video appearances ===
Year	English title	Chinese title	Singer	Notes
2019	"The Story of Us"	将故事写成我们	JJ Lin	As moon rabbit

=== Other appearances ===
Year	English title	Chinese title	Role	Notes
2015	I Am Not Madame Bovary	我不是潘金莲	Li Xuelian	test shoot
2019	The Eight Hundred	八佰	Unknown female	test shoot

== Awards and nominations ==
Year	Award	Category	Nominated work	Result	Ref.
2014	20th Shanghai Television Festival	Most Popular Actress	Beauties at the Crossfire	Nominated	
2018	7th iQiyi All-Star Carnival	Popularity Award (Actress)	—N/a	Won	
2018	15th Esquire China's Man At His Best Awards	Breakthrough Actress	—N/a	Won	
2018	24th Huading Awards	Best Actress (Ancient Drama)	Story of Yanxi Palace	Won	
2018	5th The Actors of China Award Ceremony	Best Actress (Web series)	Story of Yanxi Palace	Won	
2018	10th China TV Drama Awards	Young Rising Actress	Story of Yanxi Palace	Won	
2019	4th China Quality Television Drama Ceremony	Sina Weibo Most Talked About Celebrity Online	—N/a	Won	
2019	6th Hengdian Film and TV Festival of China (Wenrong Awards)	Best Actress	Story of Yanxi Palace, The Legend of Haolan	Won	
2019	China Entertainment Industry Summit (Golden Pufferfish Awards)	Most Promising Commercially Valuable Artist	—N/a	Included	
2019	Golden Bud - The Fourth Network Film And Television Festival	Best Actress	The Legend of Haolan, You Are My Answer	Nominated	
