= Chan Ka-yee =

Former Hong Kong TV and film actress (born 1947)

- 陳嘉儀
- Children: 2 sons

Chan Ka-yee (Chinese: 陳嘉儀) is a former Hong Kong TV and film actress, and a former artiste of TVB and Asia Television. She debuted in 1971 and retired in 2008.

== Background ==
In 1971, she joined the first TVB Artist Training Class and entered the industry. Her contemporaries included Kwok Fung, Chong Man-ching, Ko Miu-sze, So Hang-shuen, Kam Kwok-leung and others. She has performed in many TV series and hosted dramas in the 1970s and 1980s, such as "Little Women (TV series)", "A House Is Not A Home (1977 TV series)", "The Shell Game", "Twin Sisters", etc. After getting married in the 1990s, she retired from the entertainment industry. She returned to Hong Kong TVB in the 2000s to film dramas such as War And Beauty and Life Art, until she retired after leaving TVB at the end of 2008 when her contract expired. The 2009 drama "Just Love II" was her last TV series.

== Filmography ==
=== TV series (RTHK) ===
Year	Title	Role
1974-1976	Below the Lion Rock	Ko Kit-sum (高潔心)
1983	香港香港：最後關頭	Mrs. Fong (方太)
