= Huang Yi (actress) =

Chinese actress and singer (born 1979)

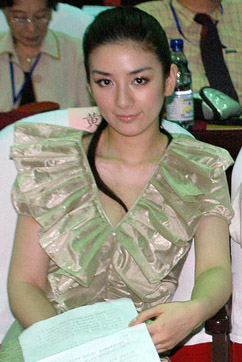
- Huang Yi in 2007
- Born: September 13, 1979 (age 46); Shanghai, China
- Education: TV & Film Department, Shanghai Oriental Culture College
- Occupations: Actress, singer
- Years active: 1998 – present

Chinese name
- Traditional Chinese: 黃奕
- Simplified Chinese: 黄奕
Transcriptions
Standard Mandarin
- Hanyu Pinyin: Huáng Yì
Yue: Cantonese
- Jyutping: Wong4 Jik6
- Musical career
- Also known as: Crystal Huang, Betty Huang
- Origin: China

Huang Yi (born September 13, 1979) is a Chinese actress and singer. She is best known for TV series Wrong Carriage, Right Groom and My Fair Princess 3.

== Filmography ==
=== Film ===
Year	English title	Original title	Role	Notes
1999	My Wishes	为你疯狂	Reporter	
1999	Crash Landing	紧急迫降	New air hostess	
2001	X Roads	新十字街头	Xie Lingling	
2004	Gewuji Ting'an Neiren	歌舞伎町案内人	Lili	
2004	Six Strong Guys	六壮士	Baobei	
2005	Everlasting Regret	长恨歌	Weiwei	
2006	The Go Master	吳清源	Wu Qingying	
2006	The Valiant Ones	新忠烈圖	Azhu	
2007	Brothers	兄弟	Chong Ching	
2008	Almost Perfect	十全九美	Tang Xiaodie	
2008	Plastic City	荡寇	Ocho	
2009	Radish Warrior	倔强萝卜	Zhao Yue	
2010	The Road Less Traveled	一路有你	Lu Yin	
2010	Sky Fighters	歼十出击	Liu Qi	
2010	Just Another Pandora's Box	越光宝盒	Younger Qiao	
2010	The Swordsman Dream	嘻遊記	Shopkeeper Tie	
2010	The Legend Is Born: Ip Man	葉問前傳	Cheung Wing-sing	
2011	Treasure Inn	财神客栈	Fire Dragon Girl	
2011	Overheard 2	竊聽風雲2	Kwok Lai-ping	
2011	The Woman Knight of Mirror Lake	競雄女俠秋瑾	Qiu Jin	
2011	East Meets West 2011	东成西就2011	Fong Ga-bo	
2012	Romancing in Thin Air	高海拔之恋II	Barbara	
2012	Happy Hotel	乐翻天	Meng Jinghua's friend	
2012	The Next 11 Days	冰雪11天	Lu Shuang	
2012	Drug War	毒戰	Yang Xiaobei	
2012	All for Love	三个未婚妈妈	Weiwei	
2013	Amazing	神奇	Fan Xi	
2013	Legendary		Lan Zeng	English-language film
2014	Just Another Margin	大話天仙	Snow	
2014	Overheard 3	竊聽風雲3	Luk Wing-fu's wife	
2015	Silently Love	默守那份情	Sai Fuqin	
2016	Chinese Wine	國酒	Cheng Yuping	
2016	Elanne Starlight	爱在星空下		co-producer
2016	Idiots	活宝		producer
2017	When We Are Seventeen	十七岁的雨季	Liu Siqi (adult)	also producer
2017	Our Days in 6E	我們的6E班		
2017	One Night, or Whole Life	识色，幸也	Kuang Yuanxi	
2019	Mortal Ouija			

=== TV series ===
Year	English title	Chinese title	Role	Notes
1998	Ernü Yingxiong Zhuan	兒女英雄傳	Yonglaichuan Yingzi	
1999	Xiari Lianyu Lu	夏日恋语录		
1999	Zhenxiang Gaobai	真情告白	Zhou Cuijun	
1999	Shiji Rensheng	世纪人生	Xia Guoxiu	
1999	Shangcheng Jie'an	商城劫案	policewoman	
1999	Bugan Zoujin Ni	不敢走近你	Miss An	
2000	Fatal Internet	夺命网络	Su Jie	
2000	Life Has Dreams	人生有梦	Zhang Tong	
2000	Wrong Carriage, Right Groom	上錯花轎嫁對郎	Li Yuhu	
2000	Longfeng Qiyuan	龍鳳奇緣	Concubine Xiao	
2000	Jealousy	妒忌	Yu Haiyan	
2001	Dushi Liren Xing	都市丽人行	Wen An	
2001	Crouching Tiger, Hidden Dragon	臥虎藏龍	Yu Xiulian	
2001	Shaolin King of Martial Arts	少林武王	Ounü	
2001	The New Woman Imperial Son-in-law	新女駙馬	Feng Suzhen; Feng Shaomin	
2001	Qiji – Meimeng Chengzhen	奇迹—美梦成真	Zhao Meimeng	
2001	Qiangqiang Ernü Dao Jianghu	鏘鏘兒女到江湖	Fang Zhichun	
2002	Brotherhood	有情有义	Zhou Ying	
2002	The Fin-de-siècle Evening Bell	世纪末的晚钟	Shen Xiaolu	
2003	My Fair Princess III	還珠格格III之天上人間	Xiaoyanzi	
2004	Wind and Cloud 2	風雲2	Second Dream	
2004	Imperial Painter Giuseppe Castiglione	宮廷畫師郎世寧	Lü Siniang	
2004	Absolute Plan	绝对计划	Zhen Zhen	
2004	The Last Concubine	末代皇妃	Empress Wanrong	
2005	Love at Apart a Moment	爱，在离别时	Tang Beiling	
2006	Qiu Haitang	秋海棠	Luo Xiangqi	
2006	Acquired Beauty	后天美女	Chen Mei	
2006	Phoenix from the Ashes	浴火鳳凰	Duan Shengnan	
2006	The Pink-Collar Generation	粉领一族	Mixue	
2006	To Live to Love	长恨歌	Wang Qiyao (younger)	
2007	Family	家	Li Ruijue	
2008	Perfection of Happiness	幸福的完美	Li Jing	
2008	Stage of Youth	青春舞台	Tian Momo	
2010	Summer's Desire	泡沫之夏	Luo Xi's mother (younger)	
2010	Shanjian Lingxiang Mabang Lai	山間鈴響馬幫來	Reduo	
2014	The Romance of the Condor Heroes	神雕俠侶	Feng Heng	
2018	Dongshan, Qing, Hou, Xue	东山晴后雪		
TBA	Fight over Fragrance	鬥香		

== Discography ==
Discography
Year	Title	Type	Notes
2003	只要有你	Single	Theme song of My Fair Princess III
2005	第一个夏天	Album	
2006	其实我爱你	Single	Ending theme song of The Valiant Ones New
2006	生命的骄傲		
2007	最后的依赖		Ending theme song of Qiu Haitang
2008	承诺		
2009	青春梦想	Single	Theme song of Stage of Youth
2009	幸福在路上	Single	Theme song of Xingfu De Wanmei
2009	完美结局	Single	Theme song of Radish Warrior
2009	天下一家		
2009	点亮梦想		
2009	一路有你		
2009	一个人走	MV	Appearance in Peter Ho's MV
2010	相思		Insert song of The Legend is Born - Ip Man
2010	海上生明月		
