= King Xiaowen of Qin =

Ruler of the state of Qin

King Xiaowen of Qin 秦孝文王
- Reign: 12 November – 14 November 250 BC
- Predecessor: King Zhaoxiang
- Successor: King Zhuangxiang
- Born: 302 BC
- Died: 14 November 250 BC (aged 51–52)
- Spouse: Queen Dowager Huayang; Queen Dowager Xia
- Issue: Zixi; King Zhuangxiang of Qin
Names
- Ancestral name: Ying (嬴); Given name: Zhu (柱) or Shi (式)
Posthumous name
- King Xiaowen (孝文王)
- House: Ying
- Dynasty: Qin
- Father: King Zhaoxiang of Qin
- Mother: Queen Dowager Tang

King Xiaowen of Qin (302–250 BC), personal name Ying Zhu or Ying Shi, was a king of the state of Qin. He is also known as Lord Anguo (安國君), based on his title before his kingship.

== Life ==
Xiaowen was the second son of King Zhaoxiang of Qin and Queen Tang, and grandson of Queen Dowager Xuan.

He was the king of Qin for less than one year, and died three days after his coronation.

Various theories explaining his short reign have been proposed. The most accepted theory is that he was very old when he ascended to the throne, as his father had ruled for over 50 years.

However, there is a conspiracy theory that Lü Buwei poisoned the king, or at least hastened his death, to put the next king, King Zhuangxiang of Qin, onto the throne.

== Family ==
Queens:

- Queen Dowager Huayang, of the Xiong lineage of the Mi clan of Chu (華陽太后 羋姓 熊氏; 296–230 BC), a royal of Chu by birth
- Queen Dowager Xia, of the Xia lineage (夏太后 夏氏; 300–240 BC), the mother of Crown Prince Yiren

Sons:

- Prince Zixi (子傒; ?–?), half-brother of Yiren
- Crown Prince Yiren (太子異人; 281–247 BC), renamed Zichu (子楚); ruled as King Zhuangxiang of Qin from 250–247 BC

King Xiaowen of Qin House of Ying Died: 250 BC
Regnal titles
Preceded by King Zhaoxiang	King of Qin; 250 BC	Succeeded by King Zhuangxiang
