= Jade Dynasty (video game) =

- Developer: Beijing Perfect World
- Publishers: CHN: Beijing Perfect World; NA: Perfect World Entertainment; EU: Perfect World Europe
- Engine: Angelica 3D, Destroyer IV
- Platform: Windows
- Release: May 28, 2007
- Genre: MMORPG
- Mode: MMO

Jade Dynasty (also known as Zhu Xian (Chinese: 诛仙)) was a free-to-play MMORPG created by Perfect World. The game's plot was based on a popular Chinese internet novel Zhu Xian. Released in an era where popular MMORPGs were besieged by bots and other problems related to trading of real-world currency for digital goods, Jade Dynasty was notable for replacing traditional click-intensive methods of training with an in-game automation system. This automation system made 3rd-party automation software largely redundant and marginalized the benefits of playing for long hours, instead rewarding smart training methods and efficient algorithmic resource consumption.

On May 1, 2018, it was announced that all game servers would be shut down on June 5, 2018. Ever since the shutdown of the official game, there have been many appearances of private servers trying to recreate what was once quite a popular Chinese MMORPG.

== Gameplay ==
Jade Dynasty is set in a world based on ancient China, where the secrets of immortality and martial-arts perfection were fought over by six human factions: Jadeon, Skysong, Vim, Lupin, Modo and Incense. Their pursuit of forbidden knowledge brought them into conflict with the six demigod tribes of the Athan: Balo, Arden, Rayan, Celan, Forta and Voida.

Each faction in Jade Dynasty has different skills, strengths, weaknesses and styles of play. Players can become more powerful through 150 levels, high ascended levels and several endgame skill systems (such as the "Chroma" system).

=== Pets ===
Players are able to obtain pets and train them, improving their quality and evolving their appearance. Pets are very useful in-game as they attack enemies and possess skills of their own. Pets have levels just like players, but their power is more affected by the pet's Grade stat. A pet will level up either by fighting alongside its master or through items like Kylin or Miradrake Orbs, and its grade can be improved through pet jades. These can be obtained through quests or by trading in Celebean items, available through the Marketplace.

All pets have a star sign stat, which determines the attacks they have access to. A pet workshop function exists to craft training materials or gear for pets.

The pet's appearance can radically change at grades 12 and 18 using special mushroom items. The appearance change is purely aesthetic - it does not affect the pet's skills or attributes. Pets also chat with the player, with the mood of the pet determining what it says.

Grade 20 pets can also be ascended. Their appearance will drastically change, and players are also able to grade them up to grade 30. When pets reach ascension, players are able to summon them instantly, and are also able to fly.

=== Classes ===
As in most fantasy MMORPGs, the games' different classes, called factions, follow some common archetypes. Their names are, however, very original, as they are based on the Chinese novel Zhu Xian's story. There are three races in Jade Dynasty: the Humans, the Athans, and the Etherkins. The Humans and the Athans races each have six classes in total, with the individual class locked onto that race. The Etherkins currently has five classes. These classes are as follows.

=== Tiers ===
Each faction has 5 Tiers of skills, each unlocked by completing a quest chain at certain milestone levels. Humans begin as non-class Initiates, so Tier 1 begins for them at Level 15, while the Athan and Etherkin start Tier 1 at Level 1.

== See also ==
- List of free MMOGs
