= Queen Dowager Zhao =

Mother of Qin Shi Huang (c. 280–228 BC)

- Born: c. 280 BC
- Died: 228 BC (aged 51–52)
- Burial: Zhiyang
- Spouse: King Zhuangxiang of Qin
- Issue: 3, including Qin Shi Huang

Zhao Ji (Chinese: 趙姬; lit. 'Consort Zhao'; (Note: Ji 姬 was an ancestral name of the Zhou royal family, which later evolved to generally mean "lady" in successive eras. But there are no more detailed mentions on her family at Zhao (which was a Boyi-descent state and shared origins with Qin) except that it was "a prominent family.") c. 280–228 BC), personal name unknown, was the wife of King Zhuangxiang of Qin and the mother of Qin Shi Huang, the first emperor of China. Upon her marriage, she was the Lady Zhao; after the king's death, she was the Queen Dowager (Chinese: 太后).

== Life ==
According to Sima Qian, Lady Zhao was the daughter of a prominent family of Zhao. She was the concubine of the merchant Lü Buwei before being offered to his protégé, Prince Yiren of Qin to be his wife. A year later, she gave birth to a son named Ying Zheng; the historian Sima Qian, ill-disposed towards the first emperor, claimed that the pregnancy was especially long and that the child was actually Lü's. The couple were living at the time in Handan, the capital of Zhao, where Yiren was a hostage; when Qin laid siege to the city, Lü was able to bribe the prince's way out of town but Lady Zhao and her infant son were forced to hide among her family. Thanks to Lü's intervention and diplomacy, Prince Yiren subsequently ascended the Qin throne, becoming known to history by his posthumous name King Zhuangxiang.

When King Zhuangxiang died in 247 BC, Crown Prince Zheng ascended the throne and Lady Zhao became the Queen Dowager. Sima Qian claimed she continued her affair with Lü Buwei but, facing exposure and persecution, he gave her a man named Lao Ai disguised as a eunuch. The couple produced two illegitimate children. After Lao Ai was killed during an attempted coup d'état, the queen was imprisoned in her palace and the children were killed.

In 237 BC, a Qi man named Mao Jiao persuaded King Zheng to welcome the Queen Dowager back from Yong to Ganquan Palace in Xianyang, for fear that other regional states would turn against the Qin if they heard that King Zheng exiled his own mother.

== Death and legacy ==
By 221 BC, when Ying Zheng had unified China and become known as Shi Huangdi, the "First Emperor", the queen-dowager was already deceased. She was posthumously promoted as Empress Dowager (Chinese: 帝太后; pinyin: Dì Tàihòu; Jyutping: Dai3 Taai3 hau6). (Note: Her title should be distinguished from the other Empresses Dowager starting from Empress Lü. Those successors were granted the slightly different title which can be also translated as Empress Dowager (Chinese: 皇太后; pinyin: Huáng Tàihòu; Jyutping: Wong4 Taai3 hau6).) She was buried with King Zhuangxiang at Zhiyang.

== Popular culture ==
She is portrayed in the manga and anime Kingdom, which was loosely based on the actual history. She is also portrayed by Wu Jinyan in the Chinese television series The Legend of Haolan (2019) and by Zhu Zhu in the series Qin Dynasty Epic.
