= King Zhuangxiang of Qin =

King Zhuangxiang of Qin 秦莊襄王

King of Qin
- Reign: c. November 250 BCE – 6 July 247 BCE
- Predecessor: King Xiaowen of Qin
- Successor: Ying Zheng
- Born: 281 BCE
- Died: 4 July 247 BCE (aged 34)
- Burial: Zhiyang (芷陽)
- Spouse: Queen Dowager Zhao
- Issue: Ying Zheng; Chengjiao
Full name
- Family name: Ying (嬴); Given name: Yiren (異人) or Ziyi (子異) or Zichu (子楚)
Posthumous name
- King Zhuangxiang (莊襄王) or King Zhuang (莊王) or King Xiang (襄王)
- House: Ying
- Dynasty: Qin
- Father: King Xiaowen of Qin
- Mother: Queen Dowager Xia

Chinese name
- Traditional Chinese: 秦莊襄王
- Simplified Chinese: 秦庄襄王
Transcriptions
Standard Mandarin
- Hanyu Pinyin: Qín Zhuāngxiāng Wáng

Yiren
- Traditional Chinese: 異人
- Simplified Chinese: 异人
Transcriptions
Standard Mandarin
- Hanyu Pinyin: Yìrén

Zichu
- Chinese: 子楚
Transcriptions
Standard Mandarin
- Hanyu Pinyin: Zǐchǔ

King Zhuangxiang of Qin (281– 6 July 247 BCE), personal name Ying Yiren (嬴異人), Ying Ziyi or Ying Zichu, was a king of the state of Qin. He was the father and predecessor of Qin Shi Huang, who would later unify China proper and become China's first emperor. He was posthumously honored as a Taishang Huang by the Qin dynasty.

== Life ==
Yiren was born to Lord Anguo, the second son and heir apparent of King Zhaoxiang, and his concubine Lady Xia (夏姬). He was chosen to serve as a political hostage in the Kingdom of Zhao. In Handan, the capital of Zhao, he met a merchant, Lü Buwei, who saw Yiren as extraordinary and detected in him the potential to become the king of Qin in the future. Lü Buwei treated Yiren well and presented his concubine Lady Zhao to Yiren. Lady Zhao later bore Yiren a son, Ying Zheng.

In the meantime, through bribes and machinations, Lü Buwei helped Yiren return to Qin. He also successfully convinced Lord Anguo's primary spouse, the childless Lady Huayang, to adopt Yiren as her own son, thereby making Yiren Lord Anguo's legitimate heir apparent. As Lady Huayang was a native of the Chu state, she renamed Yiren to "Zichu" (子楚, lit. "son of Chu"). Upon the death of King Zhaoxiang in 251 BCE, Lord Anguo ascended the throne and became historically known as "King Xiaowen", but he died the following year just three days after his coronation. Zichu succeeded his father as the king of Qin and became historically known as "King Zhuangxiang of Qin". He named Lü Buwei as his chancellor, Lady Zhao as his queen consort, and Ying Zheng as his crown prince.

Zhuangxiang died in 247 BCE after reigning for three years and was succeeded by Ying Zheng. Ying Zheng unified China and founded the Qin dynasty in 221 BCE, becoming historically known as "Qin Shi Huang", the First Emperor of Qin.

He was posthumously declared as a Taishang Huangdi by Ying Zheng.

== Popular culture ==
He is portrayed by Mao Zijun in the Chinese television series The Legend of Haolan (2019).

King Zhuangxiang of Qin House of Ying Died: 247 BCE
Regnal titles
Preceded by King Xiaowen	King of Qin; 249–247 BCE	Succeeded by Ying Zheng
