= Lao Ai =

Chinese Qin official (died 238 BCE)

- 嫪毐
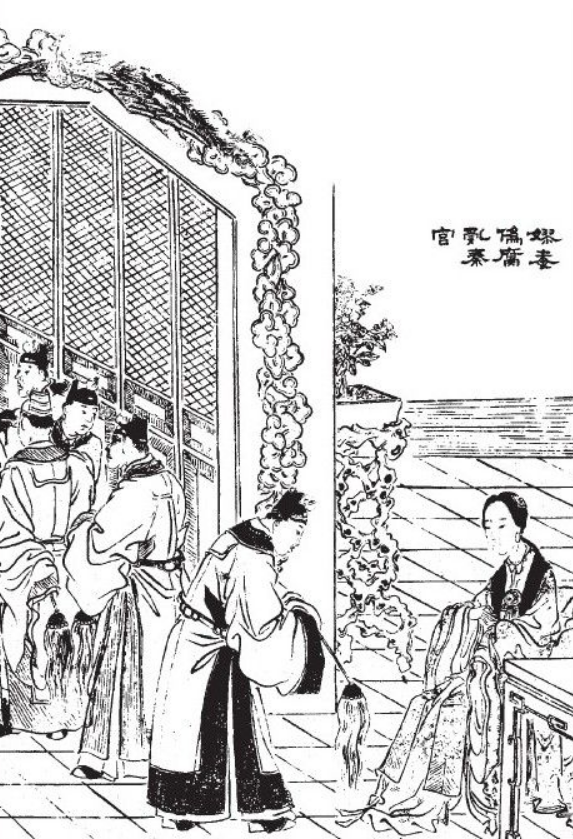
- 1912 illustration of Lao Ai posing as a eunuch.

Marquis of Changxin
- Monarch: King Zhuangxiang of Qin

Personal details
- Born: Qin
- Died: 238 BCE (executed) Qin

Lao Ai (Chinese: 嫪毐; pinyin: Lào Ǎi; died 238 BCE) was an imposter eunuch and official of the State of Qin during the late Warring States period. Allegedly falsifying his castration in order to gain entry into the court of Qin, he became the favorite of Queen Dowager Zhao, the mother of Qin Shi Huang, later the First Emperor of China. He was enfeoffed as Marquis of Changxin (長信侯). After a conspiracy to incite rebellion was uncovered, he was executed by Qin Shi Huang.

Since the conspiracy and downfall of Lao Ai, his sexual misdeeds have become a fixture in the traditional moralizing discourse of intellectuals in imperial China, and his very surname and style name, which meant "lustful misdeed" in Old Chinese, has become a byword for "fornicators" in the classical Chinese language.

== Biography ==
According to Sima Qian's Records of the Grand Historian, Lao Ai had a giant penis, being of such size that it could be used as an axle for a wooden carriage. This ability drew the attention of Lü Buwei, who was having an affair with Queen Dowager Zhao, mother to King Zheng of Qin (later Qin Shi Huang), and Lü plotted to make use of Lao's sexual prowess to ingratiate himself with the Queen Dowager. (Note: From Records of the Grand Historian, Book 85: "The First Emperor was growing up, but the Queen Dowager's immoral behaviour did not cease. Lü Buwei was afraid that disaster would befall him if they were discovered, so he secretly sought out Lao Ai, a man with a large penis, and made him a retainer. Sometimes, to the strains of licentious music, he made Lao Ai walk along with a wheel of tong-wood attached to his penis, and he ensured that the Queen Dowager heard about it so that she might be tempted. And when she heard, she did indeed want to get hold of him in private. [...]")

During the formative years of King Zheng's reign, Lü Buwei ended his affair with the Queen Dowager and gave Lao Ai to her. Lü and the Queen organised a false castration in order to facilitate Lao Ai's admission to the Queen's palace as a eunuch.

After moving to the provisional capital Yong, Lao Ai fathered two children by the queen and gave himself the diminutive "false father". Lao Ai profited from his status and gathered over one thousand servants and followers.

In 238 BCE, following the royal proclamation announcing Lao Ai's status as an imposter lover consorting with the Queen Dowager, with plans to secretly father the next king, Lao Ai was investigated. During this time, he attempted a coup d'état with a small number of followers, using the Queen Dowager's seal to gain legitimacy.

Without popular support, military training, numbers, or sufficient organisation, Lao Ai's followers were quickly defeated. Lao Ai was punished by being dismembered and torn apart by five horses and the Queen Dowager was imprisoned in her palace and her two allegedly illegitimate sons were killed. Followers were exiled to the former state of Shu.

== Historicity ==
The historicity of Lao Ai has been doubted by modern historians, who consider that Confucian ideologues, who were in favor with the Han court during the composition of the Records of the Grand Historian, had the ulterior motive of portraying Qin Shi Huang, a foe of Confucians who had ordered their mass execution in 212 BCE, as a bastard. Supporters of this theory point out that Lao Ai's name appears etymologically fanciful: the characters used to write Lao Ai literally mean "lustful misdeed" in Old Chinese, (Note: Guangyun glosses as 嫪 lào as "to be closefisted on things; also a surname." and 婟嫪 hùlào together as "to yearn and pine for") (Note: According to Shuowen Jiezi, the character 毐 ǎi is composed of 毋 "not" and 士 "gentleman-scholar" and means "an immoral man".) and that his defining characteristic, his large penis (in Chinese 大陰), can also be taken to mean "great conspiracy". Given that Sima Qian, author of the historical work that canonized this traditional account of Lao Ai, was himself subject to the punishment of castration some years before, skeptically minded historians believe that the story of Lao Ai is meant to be understood allegorically, as a "personified phallus" who represented "a basic threat to the transmission of the imperial bloodline and hence the purity of the 'united cosmos'".

The story of Lao Ai was also told by Yu Shaoyu (余邵魚), the 16th-century author of Chronicles of Many States During the Age of Spring and Fall, the length of which was nearly tripled by Feng Menglong (1574–1646), after which the book was then known as Chronicles of the Eastern Zhou Kingdoms.

== Bibliography ==
- Sima, Qian; Dawson, Raymond (1994). The First Emperor: Selections from the Historical Records (2007 paperback ed.). Oxford: Oxford University Press. ISBN 9780199226344.
- Goldin, Paul Rakita (2002). The Culture of Sex in Ancient China. University of Hawaii Press. pp. 83–85. ISBN 9780824824822.
