= Chengjiao (prince) =

Prince of Qin (256–239 BC)

- Lord Chang'an
- Born: 256 BC
- Died: 239 BC
Names
- Ancestral name: Ying (嬴); Clan name: Zhao (趙); Given name: Chengjiao (成蟜)
- Father: King Zhuangxiang of Qin

Chengjiao (Chinese: 成蟜; pinyin: Chéngjiǎo; 256–239 BC), titled Lord of Chang'an (長安君; Cháng'ān Jūn), was the son of King Zhuangxiang of Qin and the paternal younger half-brother of Qin Shi Huang. After Ying Zheng inherited the title of King of Qin from his father King Zhuangxiang, Chengjiao rebelled at Tunliu and surrendered to the State of Zhao. King Daoxiang of Zhao granted him the territory of Rao (饒; modern Raoyang County, Hebei). In 239 BC, Qin forces occupied Rao and he was killed.

== Biography ==
Chengjiao was a son of King Zhuangxiang of Qin. In the 5th year of King Zheng of Qin (242 BCE), he went to Han to take possession of the territory of 100 li ceded by King Huanhui of Han, and was afterwards enfeoffed as Lord of Chang’an.

In 239 BCE, King Zheng of Qin ordered Chengjiao to lead an army against the State of Zhao. At Tunliu (modern-day Tunliu County, Shanxi Province), Chengjiao rebelled against Qin and surrendered to Zhao. After Qin forces captured Tunliu, Chengjiao was killed. His subordinates were executed by decapitation under the law of collective punishment, and the inhabitants of Tunliu were exiled to Lintao (modern Min County, Gansu Province). King Daoxiang of Zhao posthumously enfeoffed him with the territory of Rao (northeast of modern Raoyang County, Hebei Province).

Wu Yuchui, Huang Shisan, and others believe that Rao was a fief Chengjiao had received during his lifetime, and that this may serve as evidence of his communication with Zhao. They even suspect that, supported by his uncles, he considered King Zheng of Qin to be illegitimate and defected to Zhao in hopes of seizing the throne with their backing. However, Xin Deyong, drawing on certain views of Qian Daxin, Xu Zongyan, and Li Ciming, argued that since Chengjiao was deeply trusted by his elder brother, there was no reason for him to abandon his fief of Chang’an for Rao and betray his own state. Xin therefore concluded that the “Lord of Chang’an” enfeoffed by King Daoxiang of Zhao was in fact another Lord of Chang’an, namely Daoxiang’s own uncle.

Xin further argued that the word “rebel” (反 fan) should instead be read as “return” (返 fan), meaning that Chengjiao fell ill during the campaign and was forced to withdraw, dying en route at Tunliu. After Chengjiao’s death in camp, since Tunliu had originally belonged to Han and resented Qin rule, a local soldier named Pu Gu seized the opportunity to incite a revolt and won some support. When this uprising failed, the participants were punished. Thus, in Xin’s view, Chengjiao did not in fact rebel against Qin. This also explains why Zhao did not provide him assistance, and why after his death his body was not desecrated as that of a traitor.

== Family theory ==
Li Kaiyuan, a Chinese historian residing in Japan, believes that Ziying, the last ruler of the Qin dynasty, was the son of Chengjiao. According to his view, after Chengjiao surrendered to Zhao, he resided and died there, while his infant son—still a baby at the time and thus called “Ying” (Infant)—remained in Qin and grew up to adulthood. When Qin Er Shi ascended the throne, since Ziying was his cousin and had no conflict of interest in competing for succession, he was not included in Qin Er Shi’s political purge. On the contrary, Ziying was even able to remonstrate with Qin Er Shi, urging him not to carry out indiscriminate killings.

Li Kaiyuan further suggested that Chengjiao’s mother was Lady Han, who came from the State of Han. His reasoning is based on speculation: since King Zhuangxiang’s mother, Lady Xia (consort of King Xiaowen of Qin), may also have originated from Han, and because the eunuch Han Tan, who later discussed with Ziying the plan to execute Zhao Gao, bore the surname Han, he must have belonged to the royal family of Han. However, these arguments rest on conjecture and lack direct evidence.

== Potential betrayal ==
There are disputes on whether he actually betrayed Qin for such a small land as Rao, as indicated that he did not suffer the punishment of dismemberment as Pu He (蒲鶮), a captain of sorts of the traitors in Tunliu.

== Family ==
Some historians, including Li Kaiyuan and Ma Feibai, hypothesize that Ziying, the last king of Qin, may be his son.

== In popular culture ==
In Kingdom, he (referred to as his onyomi reading, Seikyō) launched a coup that tried to kill Qin Shi Huang alongside his own faction. He was later overthrown by Lord Changwen (Shōbun Kun), Xin (Shin), loyalists and the mountain tribes. He was later pardoned and allowed leadership during Qin Shi Huang's campaigns. He was also appointed leader during a border war, but torn when the city he expected to be defended, rebelled. He was later killed by a rebel commander after being cornered, using him as an excuse to foment distrust to his brother.

He also appeared as an enemy of Qin Shi Huang and the protagonist Xiang Shaolong (項少龍) in Huang Yi's novel Record of the Search for Qin and its live action TV series (2001 and 2018), game and comics adaptations.
