= 220s BC =

Decade

This article concerns the period 229 BC–220 BC.

== Events ==
=== By place ===
==== Anatolia ====
- Attalus I of Pergamon wins the Battle of the Harpasus in western Anatolia.

==== Illyria ====
- The First Illyrian War started when the Roman Senate dispatched an army under the command of the consuls Lucius Postumius Albinus and Gnaeus Fulvius Centumalus to Illyria. Rome forced the withdrawal of Illyrian garrisons in the Greek cities of Epidamnus, Apollonia, Corcyra and Pharos and establishes a protectorate over these Greek towns.
- The Illyrian tribe of the Ardiaei is subdued by the Romans.
- The King of Macedonia, Demetrius II, dies. His nephew, Antigonus III comes to the Macedonian throne as regent for his half-cousin and the future king Philip V, who is only ten years old.
- Concerned at Rome's expansion, Antigonus III pursues a policy of befriending the Illyrians, even though the Greeks in the region support Rome in quelling the Illyrian pirates.
- The involvement of Rome in Illyria led to the establishment of friendly relations between Rome and the enemies of Macedonia: the Aetolian League and Achaean League, which approve the suppression of Illyrian piracy.
- Aratus of Sicyon brings Argos into the Achaean League and then helps liberate Athens. This brings Aratus into conflict with Sparta.

==== China ====
- The Qin general Wang Jian launches a three-pronged invasion of the state of Zhao but is hindered by the Zhao general Li Mu.
- The Zhao Prime Minister Guo Kai, influenced by the machinations of Qin, executes Li Mu.

== 228 BC ==
=== By place ===
==== Carthage ====
- The Carthaginian general Hamilcar Barca is killed in a battle in Hispania, ending his lengthy campaign to conquer the Iberian Peninsula for Carthage. In eight years, by force of arms and diplomacy, he has secured an extensive territory in the Iberian Peninsula, but his death in battle prevents him from completing the conquest. Command of his army in the Iberian Peninsula passes to his son-in-law Hasdrubal.
- Hasdrubal makes immediate policy changes, emphasizing the use of diplomatic rather than military methods for expanding Carthaginian Hispania and dealing with Rome. He founds Carthago Nova or New Carthage (modern Cartagena) as his capital city.

==== Asia Minor ====
- King Attalus I Soter of Pergamum defeats Antiochus Hierax (brother of the Seleucid king Seleucus II) in three battles and thereby gains control over all the Seleucid domains in Anatolia except Cilicia in the southeast.

==== Greece ====
- The Illyrian queen Teuta's governor, Demetrius of Pharos has little alternative but to surrender to the overwhelming Roman force. In return, the Romans award him a considerable part of Teuta's holdings to counter-balance the power of Teuta. Meanwhile, the Roman army lands further north at Apollonia. The combined Roman army and fleet proceed northward together, subduing one town after another and besieging Shkodra, the Illyrian capital.
- Archidamus V, brother of the murdered Spartan King Agis IV, is called back to Sparta by the Agiad King Cleomenes III, who has no counterpart on the throne by then. However, Archidamus V is assassinated shortly after returning.

==== China ====
- The State of Qin, its armies led by Wang Jian, completes the conquest of the State of Zhao.
- The remnants of the Zhao monarchy form a remnant state in Dai.

== 227 BC ==
=== By place ===
==== Illyria ====
- Queen Teuta of Illyria finally surrenders to Roman forces and is forced by the Romans to accept an ignominious peace. The Romans allow her to continue her reign but restrict her to a narrow region around the Illyrian capital, Shkodra, deprive her of all her other territory, and forbid her to sail an armed ship below Lissus just south of the capital. They also require her to pay an annual tribute and to acknowledge the final authority of Rome.

==== Greece ====
- The Macedonian regent, Antigonus III, marries the former king Demetrius II's widow, Phthia, and assumes the crown thus deposing the young Philip V.
- The Spartan King Cleomenes III imposes reforms on his kingdom which include the cancelling of debts, providing land for 4,000 citizens, and restoring the training of youth in the martial arts. The Ephorate, five elected magistrates who, with the King, form the main executive body of the state, is abolished (four of the five ephors being executed); the powers of the Gerousia, the oligarchic council of elders, is curtailed; and the patronomoi (the board of six elders) is introduced. Cleomenes' changes are designed to make the monarchy supreme and re-create a society of aristocrats, while neglecting Sparta's helots (serfs) and perioikoi (free but non-citizen inhabitants). Eighty opponents of the reforms are exiled, while his brother Eucleidas is installed as co-ruler in the place of the murdered Archidamus V.
- Cleomenes III defeats the Achaeans under Aratus of Sicyon at Mount Lycaeum and at Ladoceia near Megalopolis.

==== Roman Republic ====
- Sardinia and Corsica are made a combined province. Rome appoints, and in the future annually elects, two praetors (with autocratic consular powers) for this province and for Sicily.
- Gaius Flaminius becomes Rome's first governor of Sicily.

==== Seleucid Empire ====
- Antiochus Hierax tries to raise revolts against his brother Seleucus II in Syria and the east of the Seleucid kingdom. However, he is captured and exiled to Thrace, where he lives as a virtual prisoner.

==== China ====
- The Qin generals Wang Jian, Li Xin and Wang Ben invade the State of Yan in vengeance for an assassination attempt against the king of Qin, Ying Zheng, that had been organized by Crown Prince Dan.

== 226 BC ==
=== By place ===
==== Greece ====
- An earthquake destroys the city of Camirus and the Colossus of Rhodes on the island of Rhodes.
- The Spartan King Cleomenes III captures Mantinea and defeats the Achaean League under Aratus of Sicyon at Hecatombaeum, near Dyme in north-eastern Elis.

==== Roman Republic ====
- A formidable host of Gauls, some of them from across the Alps, threaten Rome.
- The Greek merchants of Massilia, frightened by Carthaginian successes in Spain (including their exploitation of the Spanish silver mines), appeal to Rome. Rome makes an alliance with the independent Spanish port city of Saguntum south of the Ebro River.
- The Romans send an embassy to Hasdrubal and conclude the Ebro Treaty which prohibits him from waging war north of the river Ebro, but allowing him a free hand to the south even at the expense of the interests of the town of Massilia.

==== Seleucid Empire ====
- Antiochus Hierax, brother of the Seleucid King Seleucus II manages to escape from captivity in Thrace and flees to the mountains to raise an army, but he is killed by a band of Galatians.
- Seleucus II dies after a fall from his horse and is succeeded by his eldest son Seleucus III Soter. At the time of Seleucus II's death, the empire of the Seleucids, with its capital at Antioch on the Orontes River, stretches from the Aegean Sea to the borders of India and includes southern Anatolia, Mesopotamia, Persia, and northern Syria. Dynastic power is upheld by a mercenary army and by the loyalty of many Greek cities founded by Alexander the Great and his successors. The strength of the empire is already being sapped by repeated revolts in its eastern provinces and dissention amongst the members of the Seleucid dynasty.

==== China ====
- The Qin generals Wang Jian, Li Xin and Wang Ben conquer western Yan and its capital Ji. To secure peace, king Xi of Yan executes his son Crown Prince Dan, who is wanted for the attempted assassination of the king of Qin, Ying Zheng.
- Lord Changping defects from the State of Qin and returns to his motherland in Chu.
- That same year, ex-Han nobility launched a failed rebellion against the Qin Forces. But in the end they were crushed.

== 225 BC ==
=== By place ===
==== Roman Republic ====
- A coalition of Cisalpine Gallic tribes (Taurini, Taurisces, Insubres, Lingones, Salasses, Agones, and Boii), reinforced by large numbers of Transalpine adventurers called Gaesatae (Gaesati), invade Italy. Avoiding the Romans at Ariminum, the Gauls cross the Apennines into Etruria and plunder the country.
- To meet this invasion, the Romans call on the Insubres' enemies, the Adriatic Veneti, the Patavini, and the Cenomani, who rapidly mobilise defensive forces. These armies are placed under the command of consuls Lucius Aemilius Papus and Gaius Atilius Regulus. After the Battle of Faesulae (near Montepulciano) between the Gauls and a Roman army in which the Romans lose many men, the combined Roman forces succeed in outmaneuvering the Gauls and force the invaders towards the coast of Tuscany. Papus pursued and harassed their rear but did not risk a pitched battle. The other Consul, Regulus, had crossed from Sardinia, landed at Pisa, and was marching towards Rome. His scouts met the Celts' advance guard head on near Telamon (modern Talamone), in an area called Campo Regio.
- Battle of Telamon: The Romans, led by the consuls Gaius Atilius Regulus and Lucius Aemilius Papus, defeated the Celts led by the Gaesatae kings Concolitanus and Aneroëstes.

==== Seleucid Empire ====
- Seleucus III Ceraunus succeeds his father Seleucus II Callinicus as ruler of the Seleucid dynasty, and takes up the task of reconquering Pergamum in Anatolia from Attalus. However, Andromachus, the first general whom he sends, is decisively defeated and captured by Attalus.

==== China ====
- The state of Qin, its armies led by Wang Ben, conquers the state of Wei.

== 224 BC ==
=== By place ===
==== Greece ====
- After the Spartan King Cleomenes III takes on Pellene, Phlius and Argos, Aratus of Sicyon is forced to call upon King Antigonus III of Macedonia for assistance. Antigonus III's forces fail to pierce Cleomenes' lines near Corinth, but a revolt against Cleomenes at Argos put the Spartans on the defensive.

==== Roman Republic ====
- The Romans, led by Consuls Gaius Atilius Regulus and Lucius Aemilius Papus, decisively defeat the coalition of Cisalpine Gallic tribes at the Battle of Telamon thus extending Roman influence over northern Italy. On the Roman side Gaius Atilius Regulus, commander of the Roman cavalry, is killed in the battle. On the Gallic side, one of the leaders, Concolitanus, is captured in battle, while the leader of the Gaesatae, Aneroëstes, kills himself when the battle is lost.

==== China ====
- Qin begins the invasion of Chu. Initially, the Qin generals Li Xin and Meng Tian capture several cities and defeat the Chu army.
- The Qin Prime Minister Lord Changping, who was born in Chu, incites a Chu rebellion against the Qin invaders. He and the Chu general Xiang Yan then surprise and defeat the Qin army led by Li Xin and Meng Tian in the Battle of Chengfu.
- Taking command of the Qin war effort, Wang Jian twice defeats Xiang Yan and captures Fuchu, the king of Chu, as well as the Chu capital Chen and the city of Pingyu.
- Xiang Yan retreats his forces south of the Huai River and makes Lord Changping the new king of Chu.

== 223 BC ==
=== By place ===
==== Seleucid Empire ====
- The Seleucid king Seleucus III is assassinated by members of his army while on campaign against Attalus of Pergamon in Phrygia.
- Seleucus III is succeeded by his younger brother, Antiochus III.

==== Roman Republic ====
- Gaius Flaminius is elected consul for the first time and, with his co-consul Publius Furius Philus, he forces the Gauls south of the Alps to submit to Rome, creating the province of Cisalpine Gaul.

==== Greece ====
- The Spartan king Cleomenes III destroys and burns the city of Megalopolis but the inhabitants are saved by Philopoemen who leads the defence of the city until the inhabitants can escape.
- The king of Macedonia, Antigonus III Doson, restores Macedonian influence in the Peloponnese for the first time in almost two decades. After signing alliances with the Achaeans, Boeotians, Thessalians and the Acarnanians, Antigonus invades the Peloponnese and drives the Spartans out of Argos, taking Orchomenus and Mantineia in the process.

==== Bactria ====
- King Diodotus II of Bactria is killed by a usurper, Euthydemus I, founder of the Greco-Bactrian Euthydemid dynasty.

==== China ====
- The Qin generals Wang Jian and Meng Wu defeat the Chu general Xiang Yan and the king of Chu, Lord Changping. Lord Changping is killed, and Xiang Yan commits suicide soon afterwards.

== 222 BC ==
=== By place ===
==== Roman Republic ====
- The Roman consuls Marcus Claudius Marcellus and Gnaeus Cornelius Scipio Calvus march into Insubres territory and besiege Acerrae, an Insubre fortification on the right bank of the River Adda between Cremona and Laus Pompeia. The Insubres are unable to relieve Acerrae because the Romans control all the strategic points around it. Therefore, they hire 30,000 Gaesatae mercenaries, led by Viridomarus (or Britomartus), who march to Clastidium, an important and strategically situated town, owned by the Marici, a Ligurian tribe allied to the Romans, they start a siege hoping that this will force the Romans to lift their siege of Acerrae to come to Clastidium's aid.
- The Romans split their forces. Marcus Claudius Marcellus heads for Clastidium while his colleague Gnaeus Cornelius Scipio Calvus continues the siege of Acerrae. At the Battle of Clastidium Marcellus defeats the Gaesatae. Marcellus personally slays Viridomarus. This victory removes the Gallic threat to Rome. Marcellus is awarded the spolia opima for the third and last time in Roman history.
- After taking Acerrae Gnaeus Cornelius Scipio Calvus marches on Mediolanum (modern Milan), another stronghold of the Insubres, which also falls into Roman hands, upon which the chieftains of the Insubres lose all hope and surrendered unconditionally. Thus the Romans succeeded in conquering the largest independent Celtic tribe in Italy and firmly established their hegemony over the Po Valley, then the most productive agricultural region in the peninsula.

==== Greece ====
- Battle of Sellasia: Cleomenes III of Sparta is defeated by Antigonus III of Macedon and his allies (the Achaean League, the Boeotian League, the Acarnanians, Epirus and the Illyrians under the command of Demetrius of Pharos) near Sellasia (north of Sparta) and flees to Egypt under the protection of King Ptolemy III. Antigonus III's forces occupy Sparta, which is the first time this city has ever been occupied.
- Almost all of Greece falls under Macedonian suzerainty after Antigonus III re-establishes the Hellenic Alliance as a confederacy of leagues, with himself as president.

==== Seleucid Empire ====
- Seleucid forces under their general Achaeus succeed in winning back all the Seleucid domains in Asia Minor (lost six years earlier to Pergamum).
- Mithridates II of Pontus gives his daughter Laodice in marriage to the Seleucid king Antiochus III. Another of his daughters, also named Laodice, is married about the same time to general Achaeus.

==== China ====
- The Qin general Wang Jian conquers Wuyue, forcing the capitulation of its ruler. The conquered region becomes the province of Kuaiji. This campaign completes the subjugation of the lands formerly held by the State of Chu, and it also serves as a precursor for the Qin campaign against the Yue tribes.
- The Qin generals Wang Ben and Li Xin conquer Liaodong, thereby completing the subjugation of Yan.
- Wang Ben conquers Dai, thereby completing the subjugation of Zhao.

== 221 BC ==
=== By place ===
==== Iberian Peninsula ====
- The Carthaginian general Hasdrubal is murdered by a Celtic assassin while campaigning to increase the Carthaginian hold on Spain. Following the assassination of Hasdrubal, Hannibal, the son of the Carthaginian general, Hamilcar Barca, is proclaimed commander-in-chief by the army and his appointment is confirmed by the Carthaginian government.
- Hannibal immediately moves to consolidate Carthage's control of Spain. He marries a Spanish princess, Imilce, then begins to conquer various Spanish tribes. He fights against the Olcades and captures their capital, Althaea; quells the Vaccaei in the northwest; and, making the seaport of Cartagena (Carthago Nova, the capital of Carthaginian Spain) his base, wins a resounding victory over the Carpetani in the region of the Tagus River.

==== Egypt ====
- Egypt's Ptolemy III dies and is succeeded by his son, Ptolemy IV. Sosibius is appointed by Ptolemy IV as his chief minister and immediately has a great influence over the young king, directing all of the affairs of state.
- At Sosibius' direction, Ptolemy IV puts to death in succession his uncle, Lysimachus, his brother Magas, and his mother Berenice II.
- King Cleomenes III of Sparta, who is in exile in Egypt, is imprisoned by Ptolemy IV on a charge of conspiracy.

==== Seleucid Empire ====
- The satrap of Media, Molon, and his brother, Alexander, revolt against Antiochus III, primarily due to their hatred towards Hermeias, Antiochus' chief minister. Molon is able to become master of the Seleucid domains to the east of the Tigris. He is stopped by Antiochus III's forces in his attempts to pass that river. Xenoetas, one of Antiochus' generals, is sent against Molon with a large force, but is surprised by Molon's forces and his whole army is cut to pieces and Xenoetas is killed. The rebel satrap now crosses the Tigris, and makes himself master of the city of Seleucia on the Tigris, together with the whole of Babylonia and Mesopotamia.

==== Greece ====
- Antigonus III dies during a battle against the Illyrians and is succeeded by his young cousin Philip V as King of Macedonia.

==== Roman Republic ====
- Gaius Flaminius builds a second race track for Rome, the Circus Flaminius.

==== China ====
- The state of Qi – by now the only other independent state in China –, is invaded by the Qin generals Wang Ben, Li Xin and Meng Tian and surrenders after offering minimal resistance. Ying Zheng, the king of Qin unifies China and proclaims himself the First Emperor, as he is the first Chinese sovereign able to rule the whole country, thus ending the Warring States period. He is known by historians as Qin Shi Huang.
- The Chinese Bronze Age ends (approximate date).

== 220 BC ==
=== By place ===
==== Greece ====
- Together with fellow Illyrian, Scerdilaidas, Demetrius of Pharos attacks Illyrian cities under Roman protection and leads a piratical squadron into Greek waters. They unsuccessfully attack Pylos, an Achaean town on the Messenian coast, in the Peloponnesus of Greece.
- Scerdilaidas and the Aetolians invade Achaea. With the help of Cynaethan traitors, they attack, seize and burn Cynaetha, a town in the north of Arcadia.
- Rome strikes again against the Illyrian pirates precipitating the Second Illyrian War.
- Demetrius seeks refuge with Philip V of Macedon, who is very resentful of the Roman interference. Rome occupies Demetrius' chief fortresses, Pharos and Dimillos.
- Aratus of Sicyon counters Aetolian aggression by obtaining the assistance of the Hellenic League now under the leadership of Philip V of Macedon. In the resulting Social War, the Hellenic League of Greek states is assembled in Corinth at Philip V's instigation. He then leads the Hellenic League in battles against Aetolia, Sparta and Elis.
- The Gortynians occupy Matala, on the island of Crete.

==== Seleucid Empire ====
- Antiochus III the Great defeats Molon at the Tigris River, defeating and killing. Antiochus goes on to conquer Atropatene.
- Meanwhile, the birth of a son to Antiochus III and Laodice (daughter of Mithridates II, king of Pontus) leads Hermeias to consider getting rid of the king so that he can rule under the name of the infant son. Antiochus discovers the scheme and arranges the assassination of Hermeias.

==== Anatolia ====
- Antiochus III's commander in Anatolia, Achaeus, having recovered all the districts which Attalus of Pergamum has gained, is accused by Hermeias, the chief minister of Antiochus, of intending to revolt. In self-defence, Achaeus assumes the title of king and rules over the Anatolian parts of the Seleucid kingdom.

==== Egypt ====
- Arsinoe III marries her brother, King Ptolemy IV of Egypt.

==== Roman Republic ====
- During his censorship, the Roman political leader, Gaius Flaminius, builds the Circus Flaminius on the Campus Martius and constructs the Via Flaminia from Rome to Ariminum (Rimini).

==== Iberian Peninsula ====
- Hannibal campaigns against the Vaccaei, he storms the Vaccaen strongholds of Helmantice and Arbucala.
- On his return home, laden with many spoils, a coalition of Hispanic tribes, led by the Carpetani, attack his army at the river Tagus, here Hannibal wins his first independent victory.

==== China ====
- Qin Shi Huang begins a system of tree-lined roads to interconnect all parts of China, and begins to join regional walls to form the beginnings of the Great Wall (Wan li chang cheng).
- Around this time, Prime Minister Li Si publishes Cangjiepian, a primer on the new orthographic standard for all of China, the Small Seal Script.

=== By topic ===
==== Art ====
- A bronze statue called Gallic Chieftain killing his wife and himself is made (approximate date). A Roman copy after the original statue is today preserved at Museo Nazionale Romano in Rome.
- A bronze statue called Dying Gallic trumpeter is made (possibly by Epigonus) (230-220 BC). A marble Roman copy after the original statue is today preserved at Museo Capitolino in Rome.

== Births ==
229 BC

- Lucius Aemilius Paullus Macedonicus, Roman consul and general (d. 160 BC)
- Qin Er Shi, Chinese emperor of the Qin Dynasty (d. 207 BC)
- Titus Quinctius Flaminius, Roman consul and general (d. 174 BC)

227 BC

- Publius Cornelius Scipio Nasica, Roman consul and general

221 BC

- Liu Fei, Chinese prince and proclaimed king of the former Qi State (d. 189 BC)

220 BC

- Attalus II Philadelphus, king of Pergamon (d. 138 BC)
- Pacuvius, Roman tragic poet and writer (d. c. 130 BC)
- Tiberius Gracchus the Elder, father of the Roman political reformer Tiberius Gracchus (approximate date) (d. 154 BC)

== Deaths ==
229 BC

- Demetrius II, Macedonian king from 239 BC (b. c. 276 BC)
- Li Mu, Chinese general of the Zhao State (Warring States Period)
- Margos of Keryneia, Greek general of the Achaean League

228 BC

- Ai of Chu, king of the Chu State (Warring States Period)
- Archidamus V, king of Sparta of the Eurypontid line
- Arsames I, king of Armenia, Sophene and Commagene
- Hamilcar Barca, Carthaginian general who has assumed command of the Carthaginian forces in Sicily during the last years of the First Punic War with Rome, helped Carthage win the Mercenary War and brought extensive territory in the Iberian Peninsula under Carthaginian control (b. c. 270 BC)
- You of Chu, king of the Chu State (Warring States Period)

227 BC

- Huan Yi, Chinese general of the Qin State (Warring States Period)
- Jing Ke, Chinese retainer and assassin of the Yan State
- Lydiadas of Megalopolis, Greek tyrant and general (strategos)

226 BC

- Antiochus Hierax, younger brother of Seleucus II, who has fought with him over the control of the Seleucid dominions in the Middle East (b. c. 263 BC)
- Lydiadas of Megalopolis
- Seleucus II Callinicus, king of the Seleucid kingdom from 246 BC

225 BC

- Seleucus II Callinicus, king of the Seleucid Empire (246-225 BC)
- Gaius Atilius Regulus, consul of the Roman Republic (Battle of Telamon).

224 BC

- Agiatis, Spartan queen
- Aneroëstes, leader of the Gallic Gaesatae (suicide)
- Dasharatha, Mauryan emperor of Magadha (approximate date)

223 BC

- Lord Changping, the last king of Chu, one of the Seven Warring States in ancient China.
- Diodotus II, King of Bactria, the son and successor of Diodotus I (approximate date) (b. c. 252 BC)
- Seleucus III, king of the Seleucid dynasty from 226 BC (assassinated) (b. c. 243 BC)

222 BC

- Ctesibius, Greek inventor and mathematician
- Eucleidas, king of Sparta (killed in the Battle of Sellasia)
- Ptolemy III Euergetes (the Benefactor), king of Egypt
- Viridomarus, military leader of the Gaesatae (Gaul)
- Xi of Yan, king of the Yan State (Warring States Period)

221 BC

- Antigonus III Doson, king of Macedon from 227 BC (b. 263 BC)
- Berenice II, queen of Egypt, daughter of Magas, king of Cyrenaica (in modern Libya), whose marriage to Ptolemy III Euergetes has reunited her country with Egypt (b. c. 267 BC)
- Hasdrubal, Carthaginian general and son-in-law of Hamilcar Barca (assassinated) (b. c. 270 BC)
- Lucius Caecilius Metellus, Roman consul and general during the First Punic War (b. c. 290 BC)
- Ptolemy III, king of Egypt, who has reunited Egypt and Cyrenaica and successfully waged the Third Syrian War against the Seleucid Empire
- Xenoetas, Seleucid general (killed during a revolt against Antiochus III)

220 BC

- Conon of Samos, Greek mathematician and astronomer whose work on conic sections (curves of the intersections of a right circular cone with a plane) serves as the basis for the fourth book of the Conics of Apollonius of Perga (b. c. 280 BC)
- Molon, general of the Seleucid king Antiochus III who has rebelled against his rule
- Hermeias, the favourite and chief minister of the Seleucid king Seleucus III and, for a short time, chief minister to Antiochus III
