= Meng Yi =

Chinese military general and politician (died 210 BCE)

- 蒙毅
- Born: Unknown
- Died: 210 BC; Yu County, Hebei
- Occupation: Official
- Father: Meng Wu
- Relatives: Meng Tian (brother)

Meng Yi (died c.August or September 210 BC) was a Chinese military general and politician. As an official of the Qin dynasty, he served in the court of Qin Shi Huang. He was a younger brother of the general Meng Tian. After Qin Shi Huang's death, Meng Yi and his brother were executed by Qin Er Shi on the urging of Zhao Gao.

== Life ==
Meng Yi's ancestors were from the Qi state of the Warring States period. His grandfather, Meng Ao, left Qi and came to the Qin state. Meng Ao served under King Zhaoxiang of Qin and his highest position was "Senior Minister" (上卿). During the reign of King Zhuangxiang of Qin, Meng Ao was appointed as a general and he led Qin's armies to attack Qin's rival states Han, Zhao and Wei. Meng Yi's father, Meng Wu, served as a general during the reign of King Zhuangxiang's son, Zheng (the future Qin Shi Huang). Meng Wu participated in the Qin campaign against the Chu state as a deputy to the general Wang Jian and succeeded in conquering Chu.

In 221 BC, Meng Yi's elder brother, Meng Tian, was also appointed as a general. He led the Qin army to attack the Qi state and conquered it, after which he was commissioned as an "Interior Minister" (內史). With the fall of Qi, Qin unified all the states in China under its rule. Ying Zheng proclaimed himself "Qin Shi Huang" (First Emperor of Qin) and established the Qin dynasty. In the following years, Qin Shi Huang put Meng Tian in charge of defending the Qin Empire's northern border from attacks by the Xiongnu and overseeing the construction of the Great Wall. Qin Shi Huang trusted the Meng family and regarded them very highly. Meng Yi served in Qin Shi Huang's court as a minister and was one of the emperor's close aides and advisors. He was allowed to ride in the same carriage as the emperor and stand near the emperor during court sessions. When Zhao Gao, a personal attendant to Qin Shi Huang's youngest son Huhai, committed a serious offence, the emperor ordered Meng Yi to prosecute Zhao according to the laws. Meng Yi went by the book and noted that Zhao Gao was to receive the death penalty and be stripped of his official titles. However, Qin Shi Huang eventually pardoned Zhao Gao on account of his diligence in performing his duties.

In the winter of 210 BC, Qin Shi Huang became seriously ill while he was on an inspection tour in eastern China so he sent Meng Yi to help him pray to the gods on his behalf. Before Meng Yi returned, the emperor died at Shaqiu (沙丘; south of present-day Dapingtai Village, Guangzong County, Henan), with only Zhao Gao, Huhai, and Li Si by his deathbed. Zhao Gao and Li Si secretly changed the emperor's final edict – which named his eldest son, Fusu, his successor – and made Huhai the new emperor instead. The falsified edict also ordered Fusu and Meng Tian, who were away at the border, to commit suicide. Fusu faithfully followed the order but Meng Tian felt suspicious and repeatedly requested for confirmation, but was placed under arrest. When Huhai heard that Fusu was dead, he wanted to spare Meng Tian, but Zhao Gao advised him against it because he feared that the Mengs would take revenge against him.

When Meng Yi returned from his mission, Zhao Gao suggested to Huhai to exterminate the Meng clan, but Huhai had Meng Yi arrested and imprisoned in Dai (代; around present-day Yu County, Zhangjiakou, Hebei). Meng Tian, who had already been arrested earlier for defying the edict, was imprisoned in Yangzhou (陽周; around present-day Yulin, Shaanxi). After Huhai returned to the Qin capital, Xianyang, he held a grand funeral for his father, after which he ascended the throne as Qin Er Shi (Second Emperor of Qin). Zhao Gao remained as a close aide to Qin Er Shi and he often spoke ill of the Mengs in front of the emperor and urged the emperor to get rid of them.

A prominent Qin royal, Ziying, strongly advised Qin Er Shi against executing the Mengs, but the emperor refused to listen. Qin Er Shi sent an envoy to meet Meng Yi and order Meng to commit suicide. Meng Yi gave a long reply, in which he hinted that the emperor had no reason to execute him. However, the envoy, who knew that the emperor wanted to see Meng Yi dead, ignored Meng's response and killed him. Meng Tian committed suicide in Yangzhou later by consuming poison.

== In popular culture ==
Jackie Chan portrayed the protagonist, Meng Yi, in the 2005 Hong Kong film The Myth. This character is loosely based on the historical Meng Yi. In the film, Meng Yi is reincarnated as a present-day archaeologist who embarks on a quest to find a mysterious element that can make objects hover in air. His quest leads him to discover his past life and to Qin Shi Huang's mausoleum.

In 2010, The Myth was adapted into the television series of the same title, with Jackie Chan as the producer for the series. Hu Ge starred as the protagonist, Yi Xiaochuan, a 21st-century freelance photographer who is accidentally transported back in time to the Qin dynasty, where he takes on his new identity as Meng Yi.

In the manga series Kingdom, Meng Yi is known as "Mou Ki", the younger son of the Great General Mou Bu (Meng Wu). Like his older brother Meng Tian, he studied under Lord Changping, and learned tactics and strategy alongside He Liao Diao (Ka Ryo Ten in the series).
