= Qin's wars of unification =

Qin campaigns to conquer all of China (230–221 BC)

- Part of the Warring States period
- Date of conquest of the six states
Date	230–221 BC
Location	China
Result	Qin victory
Territorial changes	Unification of China under the Qin dynasty

Belligerents
Qin	Han; Zhao; Dai; Yan; Wei; Chu; Qi

Commanders and leaders
Ying Zheng; Wang Jian; Li Xin; Meng Wu; Meng Tian; Wang Ben; Huan Yi †; Qiang Lei; Yang Duanhe; Neishi Teng	Han An (executed); Zhao Qian (surrendered); Hu Zhe †; Li Mu (executed); Sima Shang; Zhao Cong †; Yan Ju; Zhao Jia (POW); Wei Jia (executed); Ji Xi (POW); Crown Prince Dan (executed); Fuchu (POW); Xiang Yan †; Lord Changping †; Tian Jian (surrendered)

Strength
1,200,000	1,500,000

Qin's wars of unification (c. 230 - 221 BC) were a series of military campaigns launched in the late 3rd century BC by the state of Qin against the other six states remaining in China – Han, Zhao, Yan, Wei, Chu and Qi. Qin developed into the most powerful of China's Seven Warring States that coalesced in the wake of the declining Zhou dynasty, which had been reduced to a weak and merely ceremonial position during the Warring States period. In 230 BC, Ying Zheng, the King of Qin, began the sequence of campaigns that would bring the Warring States period to a close, setting out to conquer each of the six states one by one. This was completed in 221 BC with the fall of Qi, which further led to a more centralised form of government replacing the fengjian system of the Zhou dynasty. Ying Zheng declared himself the First Emperor – or Shi Huangdi – of a unified China under the Qin dynasty.

== Background ==
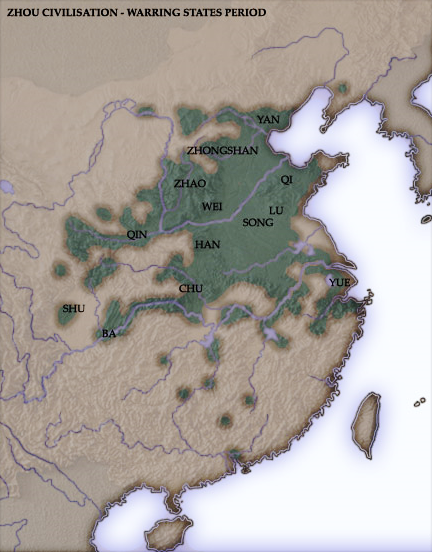
China during the Warring States period. Many smaller states had already been annexed by the time Ying Zheng became King of Qin. In particular, Ba and Shu had been conquered by Qin, Zhongshan by Zhao, Lu by Chu, and Song by Wei and Qi.

=== Rise of Qin and early conquests ===
Over the course of the Warring States period, and especially following Shang Yang's administrative reforms during the mid-fourth century BC, the state of Qin had grown to become the most powerful of the Seven Warring States that remained in China. The others repeatedly adopted a policy of "vertical alliance" (合縱; hézòng) where they all joined in as allies against Qin. However, Qin sometimes manoeuvred itself into alliances of its own among these states, forging "horizontal alliances" (連橫; liánhéng) that pitted the common enemies of Qin against one another.

In 364 BC, Qin inflicted a major defeat on a combined armies of Wei and Han. King Xian of Zhou, the nominal ruler of China, declared Duke Xian of Qin the Hegemon of China.

In the 9th Year of the new reign of King Huiwen, 316 BCE, Qin sent Sima Cuo to conquer the states of Ba and Shu. He also waged war with Wei and Yiqu.

In the 4th Year of King Wu of Qin (307 BCE), Qin captured Han's Yiyang (宜陽), beheading 60,000 people.

=== King Zhaoxiang's conquests ===
During the reign of King Zhaoxiang, Qin saw a large expansion

During his reign, Qin captured Xiangcheng, Yuan (垣), Heyong, Xinyuan, Quyang, Wucheng, Juan, Caiyang, Changshe, Huai, Xingqiu, Ancheng, plus around 70 unnamed cities from Wei. Wei would also cede the county of Wen in 275 BCE, and the Wei portion of Nanyang in 273 BCE. Qin would defeat the Wei army in 294, 293 (Together with Han), 275, 274, and 273 BCE. Wei would defeat Qin once during Zhaoxiang's reign, in 298 BCE (This was a combined defeat aginst Wei, Han, and Qi)

From Zhao, Qin captured Dai, Guanglangchng, Baoyang, and around 7 unnamed cities from Zhao. Qin defeated the Zhao army in 280, 273, 260 BCE. Qin would suffer a couple of defeats against Zhao, mainly at Eyu in 270 BCE, and the failed siege of Handan in 259-257 BCE.

From Han, Qin captured Rang, Yangcheng (陽城), Fushu (負黍), Xingcheng, Wushi (武始), Xincheng (新城). Han would also cede Yuanyong (垣雍) to Qin in 259 BCE. Qin would defeat the Han army in 293, 286, and 275 BCE.

In 269 BC, Fan Ju, who had become the chief advisor in Qin, advocated authoritarian reforms, irrevocable expansion, and an alliance with distant states to attack nearby states. In 265 BC, King Zhaoxiang of Qin made the first move by attacking the Han territory of Shangdang. The governor of Shangdang refused to surrender and presented it to Zhao instead. This led to the Battle of Changping between Qin and Zhao that resulted in a decisive victory for Qin. In 257 BC, the allied forces of Zhao, Wei and Chu managed to hold off Qin during the Siege of Handan, resulting in the first major defeat for Qin since Shang Yang's reforms.

By the reign of King Nan of Zhou, the kings of the Zhou dynasty had lost almost all political and military power, their remaining crown territories were split into two states: West Zhou, centred in Wangcheng, and East Zhou, centred in Chengzhou. Qin conquered West Zhou in 256 BC, claiming the Nine Cauldrons and symbolically making King Zhaoxiang of Qin the new Son of Heaven. In 249, King Zhuangxiang of Qin conquered East Zhou, bringing the Zhou dynasty to an end more than eight centuries after it had replaced the Shang dynasty.

=== King Ying Zheng ===
In 238 BC, King Zhuangxiang's son Ying Zheng took the reins of power in Qin after eliminating his political rivals Lü Buwei and Lao Ai. With help from Li Si, Wei Liao and others, Ying Zheng formulated a plan for conquering the other six states and unifying China. The plan, which focused on annexing each state individually, was based on "allying with distant states and attacking nearby ones" (遠交近攻), one of the Thirty-Six Stratagems. Its key steps were to ally with Yan and Qi, deter Wei and Chu, and conquer Han and Zhao.

== Conquest of Han ==
Han was the weakest of the Seven Warring States and had previously been attacked several times by Qin. In 230 BC, the Qin army led by Neishi Teng (內史騰) (Note: 內史 "Neishi" was a high-ranking official position in the Qin government, not a personal name.) moved south, crossed the Yellow River, and conquered the Han capital Zheng (鄭; present-day Xinzheng, Henan) within one year. King An of Han surrendered and Han came under Qin control. The territory of Han was reorganised to form the Qin Empire's Yingchuan Commandery, with the commandery capital at Yangdi (陽翟; present-day Yuzhou, Henan). In the following year, King An was executed after Qin forces suppressed a rebellion by Han loyalists in the former Han capital.

== Conquest of Zhao ==
From 283 to 257 BC, Qin and Zhao had frequently engaged in warfare against one another; the Zhao defeat at the Battle of Changping in 260 BC had also severely weakened Zhao's military might.

In 236 BC, while Zhao was attacking Yan, Qin used the opportunity to send two separate forces to invade Zhao. The Qin army led by Wang Jian conquered the Zhao territories of Eyu (閼與; present-day Heshun County, Shanxi) and Liaoyang (撩陽; present-day Zuoquan County, Shanxi), while the other Qin army under the command of Huan Yi, Qiang Lei (羌瘣) and Yang Duanhe (楊端和) captured Ye and Anyang. Zhao lost nine cities.

Two years later, Qin planned to attack Han but feared that Zhao might support Han, so Huan Yi was ordered to lead an army from Shangdang to attack the Zhao territories of Pingyang (平陽) and Wucheng (武城), both located south of present-day Ci County, Hebei. Over 100,000 soldiers lost their lives in the battle, including the Zhao general Hu Zhe (扈輒). In 233 BC, Huan Yi crossed the Taihang Mountains and conquered the Zhao territories of Chili (赤麗) and Yi'an (宜安), both located southeast of present-day Shijiazhuang, Hebei.

In response to the Qin invasion, King Qian of Zhao recalled Li Mu, a Zhao general famous for defending the northern border from the Xiongnu, from his post in the north to the Zhao capital Handan. The king then put Li Mu in command of the Zhao forces to resist the Qin invaders. In 233 BCE, Li Mu led Zhao forces to attack Qin forces led by Huan Yi at Fei (肥; west of present-day Jinzhou, Hebei) and Yi'an, and inflicted a crushing defeat on the enemy. The Zhan Guo Ce recorded that Huan Yi was killed in battle. King Qian was so pleased that he awarded Li Mu the title "Lord Wu'an" (武安君).

In 232 BC, Qin forces besieged and captured Langmeng (狼孟; present-day Yangqu County, Shanxi) and proceeded to attack Fanwu (番吾; present-day Lingshou County, Hebei), but were once again defeated by Zhao forces under Li Mu. However, sources claim that Zhao forces also sustained heavy losses in this battle and could only retreat to defend the Zhao capital Handan and its surrounding areas.

Despite Li Mu's success in leading the defence of Zhao from the Qin invasion, Zhao was struck by two natural disasters in the following two years – an earthquake around Dai County, and a severe famine caused by a drought. In 229 BC, Qin took advantage of the situation to attack the Zhao capital Handan. Three Qin armies embarked from Shangdi (上地; present-day Shaanxi), Jingxing and Henei (present-day Xinxiang, Henan), respectively led by Wang Jian, Qiang Lei and Yang Duanhe, to coordinate the attack on Handan. Meanwhile, the Qin general Li Xin led two forces from Taiyuan and Yunzhong to attack Dai County in the north. Zhao forces led by Li Mu and Sima Shang (司馬尚) built defensive structures and avoided direct confrontation with Qin forces, who were unable to advance further, resulting in a stalemate.

The Qin government sent spies to bribe Guo Kai (郭開), a Zhao minister highly trusted by King Qian, to trick the king into believing that Li Mu was plotting to overthrow the king. Doubting Li Mu's loyalty, King Qian ordered Li Mu to hand over his command to his deputies, Zhao Cong (趙蔥) and Yan Ju (顏聚). When Li Mu defied the order, the king became more suspicious of him and ordered his arrest and eventual execution in prison. In 228 BC, after learning that Li Mu had been eliminated, the Qin forces attacked and conquered Dongyang (東陽; located east of the Taihang Mountains). Zhao Cong was killed in action while Yan Ju escaped after his defeat. Seven months later, Qin forces occupied Handan, captured King Qian and sent him into exile in Fangling.

King Qian's brother Prince Jia escaped from Handan and retreated to Dai County. With help from some Zhao loyalists, he declared himself king and established the short-lived state of Dai. In 222 BC, Wang Ben led Qin forces to conquer Dai and captured Prince Jia.

Summary of events
Year	Event
256 BC	Zhou was conquered by Qin.
230 BC	Han was conquered by Qin.
228 BC	Zhao was conquered by Qin.
225 BC	Wei was conquered by Qin.
223 BC	Chu was conquered by Qin.
222 BC	Yan and Dai were conquered by Qin.; Wuyue was conquered by Qin.
221 BC	Qi surrendered to Qin.; China was unified under the Qin dynasty.

== Conquest of Yan ==
In 228 BC, after the fall of Zhao, the Qin general Wang Jian mobilised Qin forces from Zhongshan (present-day central Hebei) to prepare for an offensive on Yan. Ju Wu (鞠武), a Yan official serving as a tutor to Crown Prince Dan of Yan, suggested to King Xi of Yan to form an alliance with Dai, Qi and Chu to counter the impending Qin invasion. However, the prince opposed Ju Wu's idea and, without gaining his father's approval, sent an assassin Jing Ke to assassinate Ying Zheng, the King of Qin. Jing Ke pretended to be an envoy from Yan to Qin, requesting to present two items to Ying Zheng: the head of Fan Wuji, (Note: Fan Wuji is believed to be Huan Yi, a Qin general who had fled to Yan to escape punishment after his defeat during the Qin conquest of Zhao.) a former Qin general who had betrayed Qin and fled to Yan; and a map of the Yan territory Dukang (督亢; around present-day northeastern Baoding, Hebei), which Yan was supposedly going to cede to Qin in order to make peace. Jing Ke's plan was to get up close to Ying Zheng to show him the map, and then assassinate him with a poison-coated dagger hidden in the rolled-up map. Jing Ke ultimately did not succeed in his mission and lost his life in the process.

In 226 BC, Ying Zheng used the assassination attempt as a casus belli to order Wang Jian and Xin Sheng (辛勝) to lead Qin forces to attack Yan. After defeating Yan forces and their reinforcements from Dai at the eastern bank of the Yi River (易水; in present-day Yi County, Hebei), Qin forces advanced further into Yan and conquered the Yan capital Ji (薊; present-day Beijing). King Xi, Crown Prince Dan, and the surviving Yan forces retreated to the Liaodong Peninsula. The Qin general Li Xin led his troops to pursue them to the Yan River (衍水; present-day Hun River, Liaoning), where they destroyed most of what was left of the Yan forces. In order to make peace, King Xi executed Crown Prince Dan and sent his head to Ying Zheng as an "apology" for the assassination attempt. Ying Zheng accepted the "apology"; there was peace between Qin and Yan for the next three years.

In 222 BC, Qin forces led by Wang Ben and Li Xin invaded the Liaodong Peninsula, destroying the Yan forces and capturing King Xi. The former Yan territories were partitioned and reorganised to form the Yuyang, Beiping, Liaoxi and Liaodong commanderies of the Qin Empire.

== Conquest of Wei ==
In 225 BC, the Qin general Wang Ben led 600,000 troops to conquer more than ten cities on the northern border of Chu as a precautionary move to guard the flank from Chu attacks while they were invading Wei. Wang Ben then led his forces north to attack and besiege the Wei capital Daliang (大梁; northwest of present-day Kaifeng, Henan). As Daliang was situated at the concourse of the Sui and Ying rivers and the Hong Canal (鴻溝; in present-day Zhengzhou, Henan), its geographical location gave it a natural defensive advantage. Besides, the moat around Daliang was vast and all the city's five gates had drawbridges, making it even more difficult for Qin forces to breach the city walls. Wei forces used the opportunity to strengthen their fortifications and defences.

Wang Ben came up with the idea of redirecting the waters from the Yellow River and the Hong Canal to flood Daliang. His troops laboured for three months to redirect the water flow while maintaining the siege on Daliang, and succeeded in their plan. Daliang was heavily flooded and over 100,000 people died, including civilians. King Jia of Wei surrendered and Wei came under Qin control. The Zizhi Tongjian mentioned that King Jia was executed after his surrender. The Qin government established the commanderies of Dang and Sishui in the former Wei territories.

== Conquest of Chu ==
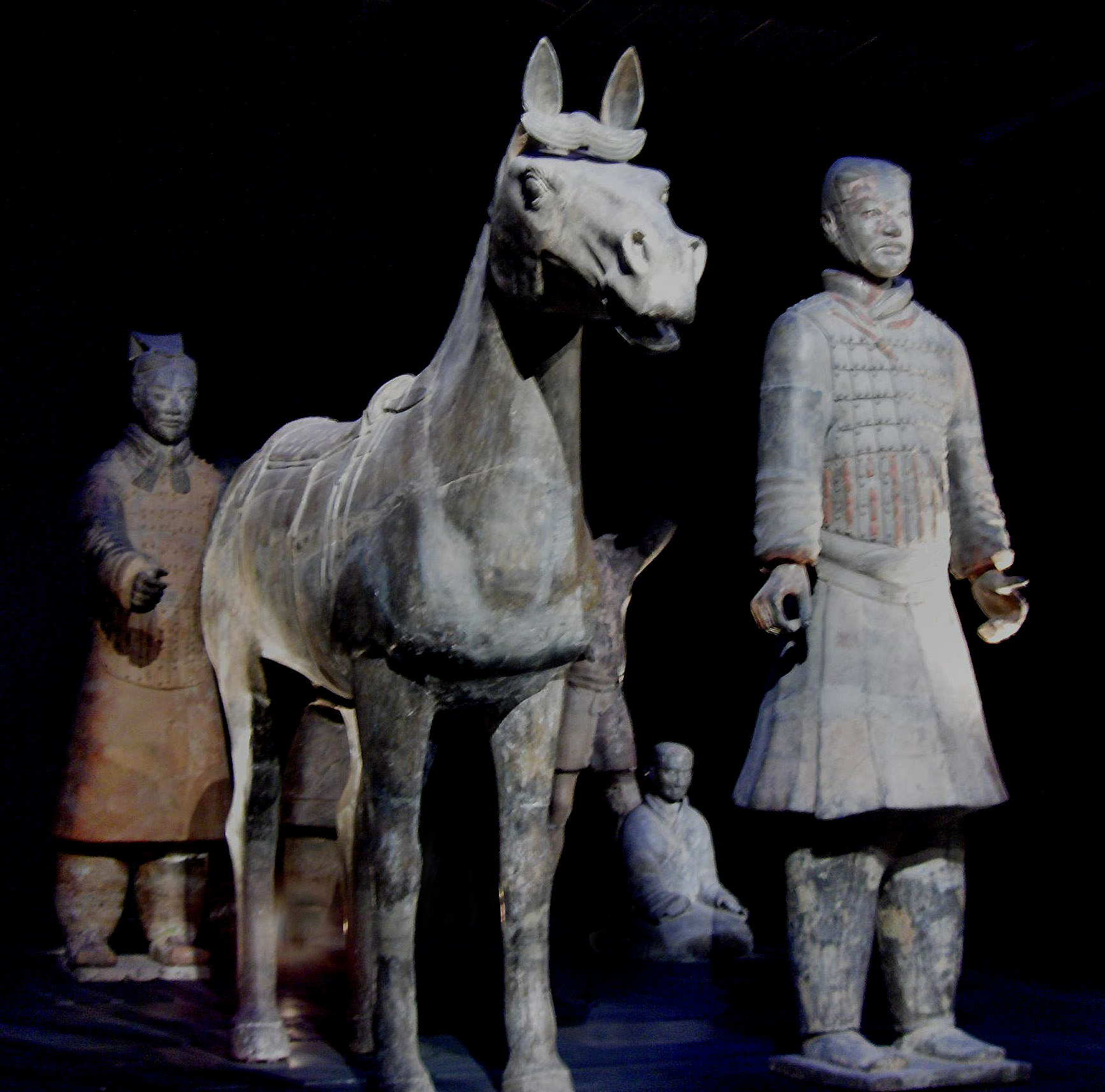
Qin horse and handler

In 226 BC, Qin forces led by Wang Ben had attacked Chu and conquered ten cities. Two years later, Ying Zheng, the King of Qin, called for a meeting with his subjects to discuss the Qin invasion of Chu. Wang Jian felt that they needed at least 600,000 troops for the campaign, while Li Xin claimed that 200,000 troops would suffice. Ying Zheng chose to follow Li Xin's idea, ordering him and Meng Tian to lead 200,000 troops to attack Chu. Wang Jian claimed that he was ill and retired to recuperate at home.

Initially, the Qin forces achieved success as Li Xin captured Pingyu while Meng Tian captured Qinqiu (寢丘; present-day Linquan County, Anhui). After conquering Yan (鄢; present-day Yanling County, Henan), Li Xin headed west to rendezvous with Meng Tian at Chengfu (城父; east of present-day Baofeng County, Henan).

In the meantime, the Chu general Xiang Yan (項燕) had avoided using the bulk of the Chu forces to resist the Qin invaders while waiting for an opportunity to launch a counterattack. During this time, Lord Changping, a Qin noble with ties to the Chu royal family, (Note: Lord Changping's father was King Kaolie of Chu and his maternal grandfather was King Zhaoxiang of Qin, who was also the paternal great-grandfather of Ying Zheng, the King of Qin. Lord Changping was therefore a first cousin once removed of Ying Zheng.) incited a rebellion in Chen (陳; present-day Huaiyang, Zhoukou, Henan), which had previously been conquered by Li Xin, and prepared for a surprise attack on the Qin invaders. For three days and three nights, Xiang Yan led the Chu army to secretly follow the Qin army at high speed before coordinating an attack on them with support from Lord Changping's forces. Most of the Qin forces under Li Xin were destroyed in the battle.

Upon learning of Li Xin's defeat, Ying Zheng visited Wang Jian, apologised for not heeding his advice earlier, and invited him back to serve in the Qin army. He put Wang Jian in command of the 600,000 troops he had requested earlier, and assigned Meng Tian's father Meng Wu to serve as Wang Jian's deputy. Wang Jian knew that Ying Zheng did not fully trust him because he could easily turn against Qin with such a massive army under his command. Thus, in order to reduce the king's suspicions towards him, he maintained close contact with the king by frequently sending messengers to report his progress and request the king to reward his family after he had conquered Chu for Qin.

In 224 BC, after the Qin army under Wang Jian passed through Chen and made camp at Pingyu, the Chu army led by Xiang Yan assaulted the Qin camp but failed to push back the invaders. When Xiang Yan tried to lure Wang Jian to attack him, the latter ordered his troops to hold their positions and forbade them from attacking. After some time, Xiang Yan gave up and ordered a retreat. Taking advantage of the opportunity to launch an all-out offensive, the Qin forces took the retreating Chu forces by surprise and routed them at Qinan (蕲南; northwest of present-day Qichun County, Hubei). Xiang Yan was killed in action.

In 223 BC, Wang Jian conquered the Chu capital Shouchun and captured King Fuchu of Chu, who was reduced to the status of a commoner. The surviving Chu forces made Lord Changping their new king, but shortly after Lord Changping was defeated and killed by Qin forces under Meng Wu. By then, Chu had been completely conquered by Qin. The following year, Wang Jian and Meng Wu led Qin forces to attack the Wuyue region (covering present-day Zhejiang and Jiangsu), which was inhabited by the Baiyue, and captured the descendants of the royal family of the ancient state of Yue. The conquered Wuyue territories became the Qin Empire's Kuaiji Commandery.

== Conquest of Qi ==
In 264 BC, Tian Jian became the King of Qi. As he was too young to rule, his mother the Queen Dowager became his regent. Qin agents bribed Qi's chancellor Hou Sheng (後勝) to dissuade the Qi government from helping the other states while they were being attacked by Qin. By 221 BC, Qi was the only state yet to be conquered by Qin. Even though their troops were not well-equipped and morale was low, the Qi government hurriedly mobilised them to the western border to counter a Qin invasion.

In the same year, Ying Zheng used Qi's rejection of a meeting with a Qin envoy as pretence to attack Qi. A Qin army led by Li Xin avoided direct confrontation with Qi forces stationed on their western border, and advanced into Qi via a southern detour from the former Yan territories. The Qin forces encountered little resistance as they passed through Qi territories and eventually showed up at the gates of the Qi capital Linzi. Caught off guard, Tian Jian heeded Hou Sheng's advice and surrendered to Qin without putting up a fight; Tian Jian was exiled to Gong, where he eventually died of starvation. The former Qi territories were reorganised to form the Qin Empire's Qi and Langya commanderies.

== Aftermath ==
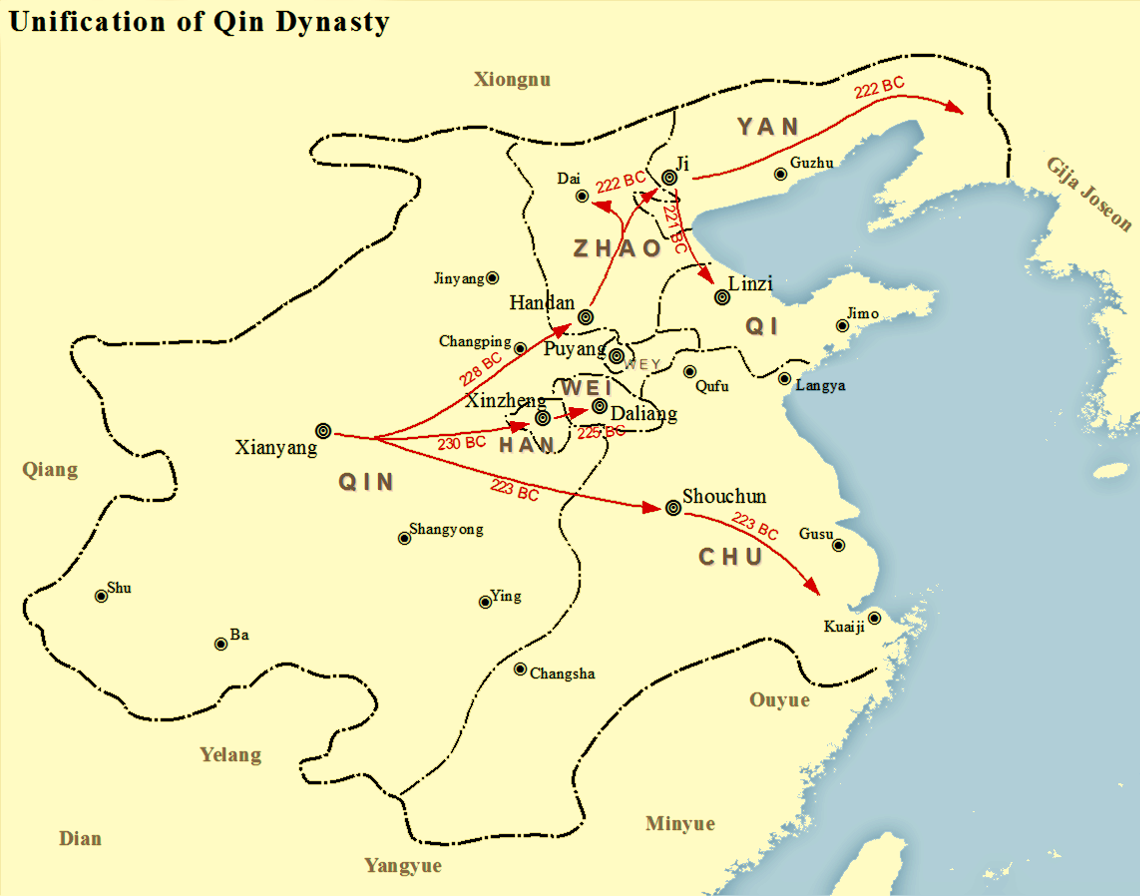
Map of Qin unification

In 221 BC, after the conquest of Qi, Ying Zheng declared himself "Shi Huangdi" – the First Emperor – and the Qin dynasty became the ruling dynasty in China. In contrast to the decentralised fengjian system of earlier dynasties, the Qin dynasty established a new centralised system to govern the Qin Empire, which was divided into 36 commanderies with Xianyang as the imperial capital.

The emperor's expansionist ambitions did not end with the unification of China. In 215, he ordered Meng Tian to lead over 300,000 troops to drive away the Xiongnu, who had been encroaching the territories of the northern states throughout the Warring States period. Following a major victory against the Xiongnu, Qin forces reinforced and built a fortification, which became the Great Wall of China, stretching across the east from the Liaodong Peninsula towards the west of Lop Nur to protect the northern border from incursions by the Xiongnu.

In the south, a Qin army of 500,000 attacked Yue and subjugated the Baiyue peoples who inhabited the areas around present-day Jiangsu, Zhejiang, Fujian, and Guangdong. During the battle, another project was announced with the construction of a massive canal from the imperial capital Xianyang to Yue. It was the key to Qin's success in conquering Yue, which became a vassal of the Qin Empire for over a decade. After these two victories, Ying Zheng created a centralised empire that would become the bedrock of future Chinese dynasties. Although the Qin dynasty lasted only 15 years, its influence on Chinese history lasted for centuries.

In 209 BC, about a year after Ying Zheng's death, Chen Sheng and Wu Guang staged an uprising to overthrow the Qin dynasty due to the Qin government's brutal and oppressive policies. Although the revolt was crushed by Qin imperial forces, several other rebellions erupted throughout the Qin Empire over the next three years. Ying Zheng's grandson Ziying would be the third and final Qin emperor; he surrendered to rebel forces led by Liu Bang which occupied Xianyang in 206 BC, bringing the Qin dynasty to an end. Some of the victorious rebels claimed to be restoring the former states that had been conquered by Qin, and numerous pretenders to the vacant thrones began to emerge. In the same year, while still under occupation by Liu Bang, Xianyang was attacked and overrun by the forces of Xiang Yu, a descendant of the Chu general Xiang Yan. Xiang Yu and Liu Bang went on to fight for control over China in a conflict known as the Chu–Han Contention, which ended with Liu Bang's victory in 202 BC. Liu Bang then established the Han dynasty as the ruling dynasty, ultimately inheriting and consolidating much of what had been initially conceived by the Qin dynasty.
