= Qin campaign against the Xiongnu =

Qin's campaign against the Xiongnu (3rd century BC)

Qin's campaign against the Xiongnu
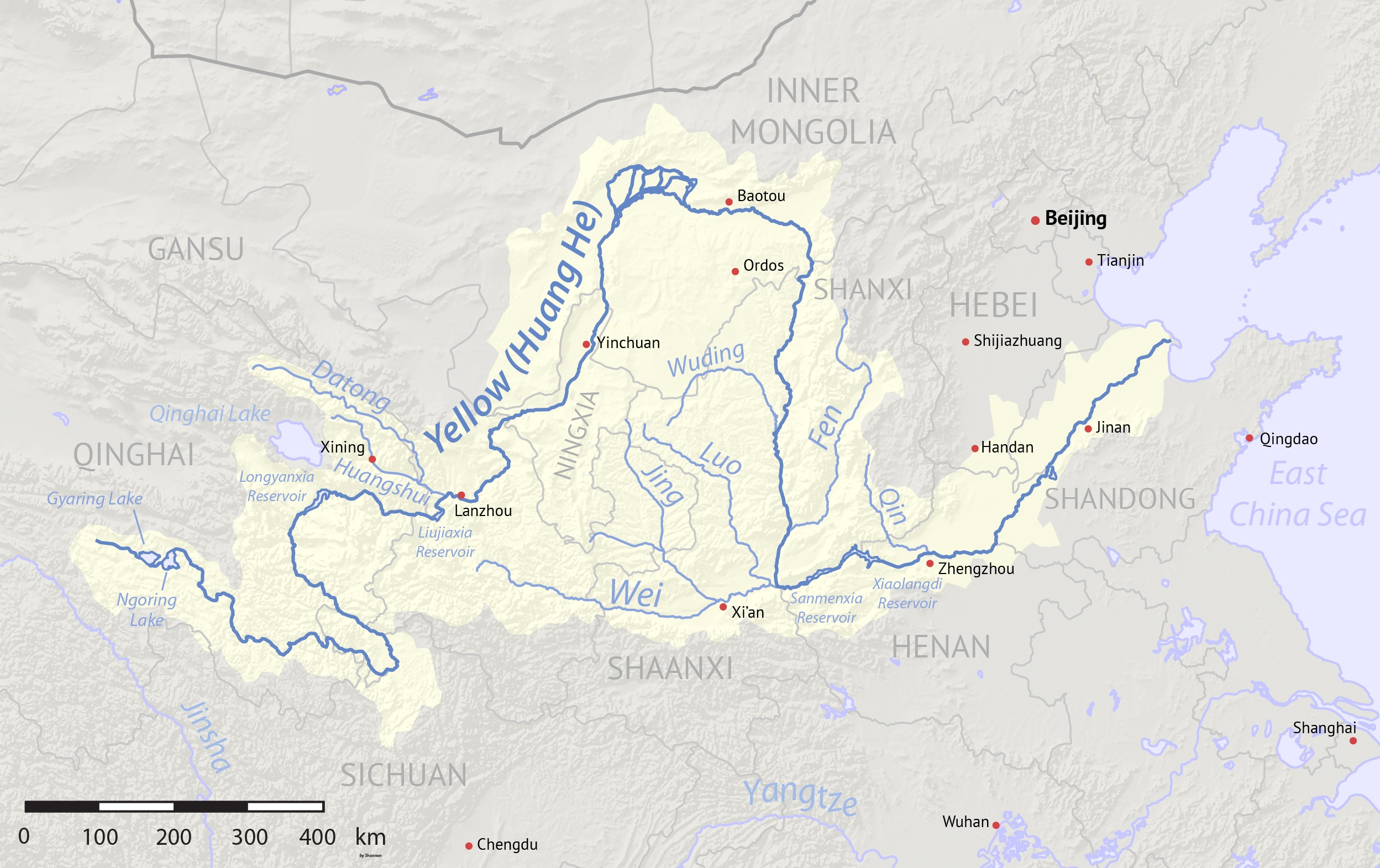
- Map of the Ordos region
Date	215 BC
Location	Ordos region
Result	Qin victory
Territorial changes	Chinese control over the Ordos, with border fortifications as a barrier between the Chinese state and nomadic territories

Belligerents
Qin dynasty	Xiongnu

Commanders and leaders
Meng Tian	Touman

Strength
Reported as 100,000 or 300,000 troops	—

In 215 BC, Qin Shi Huang ordered General Meng Tian to set out against the Xiongnu tribes in the Ordos region and establish a frontier region at the loop of the Yellow River. The emperor launched a preemptive strike against the Xiongnu, because he believed that the Xiongnu posed a potential threat and sought to expand his empire.

== Course ==
In 215 BC, the Qin army led by General Meng Tian defeated the Xiongnu, drove them from the Ordos, and seized their lands. After the catastrophic defeat at the hands of Meng Tian, the Xiongnu leader Touman fled far north into the Mongolian Plateau.

== Aftermath ==
Following the victory, General Meng Tian was instructed to secure the frontier with a line of fortifications, which would become known as the Great Wall of China. He and Crown Prince Fusu were stationed at a garrison in Suide and undertook the construction of the walled defenses, which was connected with the old walls from the Qin, Yan, and Zhao states.

As a result of the northward expansion and the resulting threat of the Qin empire, the many different Xiongnu tribes reorganized and united into a confederacy against the Chinese state.

== See also ==
- Han–Xiongnu Wars
- Qin campaign against the Baiyue
- Zhao–Xiongnu War

== Bibliography ==
- Beckwith, Christopher I. (2009). Empires of the Silk Road: A History of Central Eurasia from the Bronze Age to the Present. Princeton: Princeton University Press. ISBN 9780691150345.
- Cheng, Dalin (2005). "The Great Wall of China". Borders and border politics in a globalizing world. Lanham: SR Books. ISBN 0-8420-5103-1.
- Cosmo, Nicola Di (1999). "The northern frontier in pre-imperial China". The Cambridge history of ancient China: From the origins of civilization to 221 B.C. Cambridge: Cambridge University Press. ISBN 0-521-47030-7.
- Ebrey, Patricia Buckley; Walthall, Anne; Palais, James B. (2009). East Asia: A cultural, social, and political history (2nd ed.). Boston: Houghton Mifflin. ISBN 978-0-547-00534-8.
- Higham, Charles F.W. (2004). Encyclopedia of ancient Asian civilizations. New York: Facts On File. ISBN 0-8160-4640-9.
