= 227 (disambiguation) =

227 was a year in the Julian calendar.

227 BC was a year in the pre-Julian Roman calendar.

227 may also refer to:

- 227 (number), properties and uses of the number
- 227 Philosophia, a main-belt asteroid
- 227 (TV series), a sitcom that aired on NBC in the United States from 1985 to 1990
- 227 series, a DC EMU train operated by West Japan Railway Company
- The Xiao Zhan incident, also known as the 227 incident, a 2020 online controversy

== See also ==
- 227 BC
- List of highways numbered 227
