= Zhao–Xiongnu War =

3rd century BC conflict in China

Date	265 BC
Location	Dai (Present-day Yu County, Hebei) and Yanmen (Present-day Youyu County, Shanxi)
Result	Zhao victory

Belligerents
Zhao	Xiongnu

Commanders and leaders
Li Mu	Xiongnu Chanyu

Strength
1,300 war chariots 13,000 cavalry 50,000 infantry 100,000 archers	100,000

Casualties and losses
Unknown	Very heavy

The Zhao–Xiongnu War (Chinese: 趙破匈奴之戰) was a war that took place between the state of Zhao and the Xiongnu confederation in 265 BC during the Warring States period of China.

== Background ==
The Zhao state in North China bordered areas inhabited by nomadic tribes described as the Hu (胡) people. Zhao first came into contact with the Hu in 457 BC.

Throughout the history of Zhao, there were numerous raids on its borders from different Hu tribes.

During the reign of the King Wuling of Zhao (325 BC – 299 BC), his kingdom was harassed by different Hu tribes such as the Donghu, the Loufan and the Linhu. In 307 BC, he made a decision to reform the Zhao military by making it adapt many of the traits that nomadic tribes had. This included creating a cavalry unit, using horse archers and adaptation of fur attire. With a newly reformed army, Zhao expanded into northern territories successfully defeating the Linhu (306 BC) and Loufan (304 BC) tribes and added their soldiers to its army. Zhao then established three commanderies of Yunzhong, Yanmen, and Dai in the new territories. They were protected by erecting long earthen barricades along what is now considered the Outer Great Wall.

== Defensive approach ==
During the reign of King Huiwen of Zhao (298 BCE – 266 BCE), a Hu tribe called the Xiongnu became increasingly powerful and conducted frequent raids from the north on the borders of Zhao.

General Li Mu was appointed to oversee the borders and would frequently stay at Dai and Wild Goose Gate. He was given power to appoint officials and used the taxes to train the soldiers there, also known as mufu. He killed several cows each day to feed the soldiers while also personally providing training to the soldiers on how to shoot arrows, ride horses and maintain beacon towers.

Li made a decree stating that whenever the Xiongnu conduct raids, soldiers are to light the beacons and everyone is to retreat to the fortifications. They are not allowed to engage in battle or they would be executed. The approach was successful with no casualties or losses even after a few years. However both the Xiongnu and the Zhao soldiers thought Li was a coward. King Huiwen replaced Li and the next year, every time the Xiongnu came the new general would let the soldiers attack them. Each time, they suffered significant setbacks with significant casualties. As a result, Zhao was unable cultivate the land or raise animals on the border. King Huiwen ordered Li to return to his post on the border but Li initially refused. Li stated if he was to return, he should be allowed to use his original approach of retreating without being forced to fight. King Huiwen agreed and Li returned.

For another few years, there were few to no casualties and the Xiongnu were unable to get anything out of their raids since everyone had retreated to the fortifications with their things of value.

== Battle ==
Eventually Li believed that Zhao had enough forces to face the Xiongnu and the time was right to fight them. The border soldiers were no longer getting the same rewards they were getting and were very eager to fight the Xiongnu.

Li then prepared a large army that consisted of 1,300 war chariots, 13,000 cavalry, 50,000 infantry and 100,000 archers.

Li carried out many military exercises with this army. Then he scattered this large force around the pastures and the countryside.

The Xiongnu first sent a small contingent to raid the border. Li pretended to be defeated, and abandoned a few thousand men to the Xiongnu.

The Xiongnu Chanyu, hearing about this significant victory, decided to launch a large scale invasion into Zhao.

Li divided his army into two and waited to ambush the invading Xiongnu forces. The Xiongnu found themselves completely encircled and were attacked from both left and right positions. Thousands of both Xiongnu soldiers and horses were killed in the battle.

Following up on this Li then attacked other Hu tribes where he exterminated the Chan Lan, defeated the Donghu, and forced the remaining Linhu tribes to surrender. The Xiongnu Chanyu himself was forced to flee far away.

== Aftermath ==
For a decade after the battle, the Xiongnu did not dare approach the borders of Zhao. Since Zhao no longer had to worry about threats from the north, it could focus its attention on fighting the other states in the central plains.

Li himself would later fight against Yan, and became one of the main obstacles for the Qin in their wars of unification.

== In popular culture ==
In Hara Yasuhisa's Kingdom, this event was briefly mentioned in Chapter 155.

In a one-shot manga that Yasuhisa wrote before publishing Kingdom, it details the preparations Li made for the war.

== Sources ==
Cosmo, Nicola Di (25 February 2002). Ancient China and its Enemies: The Rise of Nomadic Power in East Asian History. Cambridge University Press. ISBN 978-1-139-43165-1.
