= 227 BC =

227 BC in various calendars
Gregorian calendar	227 BC; CCXXVII BC
Ab urbe condita	527
Ancient Egypt era	XXXIII dynasty, 97
Pharaoh	Ptolemy III Euergetes, 20
Ancient Greek Olympiad (summer)	138th Olympiad, year 2
Assyrian calendar	4524
Balinese saka calendar	N/A
Bengali calendar	−820 – −819
Berber calendar	724
Buddhist calendar	318
Burmese calendar	−864
Byzantine calendar	5282–5283
Chinese calendar	癸酉年 (Water Rooster); 2471 or 2264 — to — 甲戌年 (Wood Dog); 2472 or 2265
Coptic calendar	−510 – −509
Discordian calendar	940
Ethiopian calendar	−234 – −233
Hebrew calendar	3534–3535
- Hindu calendars
Vikram Samvat	−170 – −169
Shaka Samvat	N/A
Kali Yuga	2874–2875
Holocene calendar	9774
Iranian calendar	848 BP – 847 BP
Islamic calendar	874 BH – 873 BH
Javanese calendar	N/A
Julian calendar	N/A
Korean calendar	2107
Minguo calendar	2138 before ROC 民前2138年
Nanakshahi calendar	−1694
Seleucid era	85/86 AG
Thai solar calendar	316–317
Tibetan calendar	阴水鸡年 (female Water-Rooster) −100 or −481 or −1253 — to — 阳木狗年 (male Wood-Dog) −99 or −480 or −1252

Year 227 BC was a year of the pre-Julian Roman calendar. At the time it was known as the Year of the Consulship of Flaccus and Regulus (or, less frequently, year 527 Ab urbe condita). The denomination 227 BC for this year has been used since the early medieval period, when the Anno Domini calendar era became the prevalent method in Europe for naming years.

== Events ==
=== By place ===
==== Illyria ====
- Queen Teuta of Illyria finally surrenders to Roman forces and is forced by the Romans to accept an ignominious peace. The Romans allow her to continue her reign but restrict her to a narrow region around the Illyrian capital, Shkodra, deprive her of all her other territory, and forbid her to sail an armed ship below Lissus just south of the capital. They also require her to pay an annual tribute and to acknowledge the final authority of Rome.

==== Greece ====
- The Macedonian regent, Antigonus III, marries the former king Demetrius II's widow, Phthia, and assumes the crown thus deposing the young Philip V.
- The Spartan King Cleomenes III imposes reforms on his kingdom which include the cancelling of debts, providing land for 4,000 citizens, and restoring the training of youth in the martial arts. The Ephorate, five elected magistrates who, with the King, form the main executive body of the state, is abolished (four of the five ephors being executed); the powers of the Gerousia, the oligarchic council of elders, is curtailed; and the patronomoi (the board of six elders) is introduced. Cleomenes' changes are designed to make the monarchy supreme and re-create a society of aristocrats, while neglecting Sparta's helots (serfs) and perioikoi (free but non-citizen inhabitants). Eighty opponents of the reforms are exiled, while his brother Eucleidas is installed as co-ruler in the place of the murdered Archidamus V.
- Cleomenes III defeats the Achaeans under Aratus of Sicyon at Mount Lycaeum and at Ladoceia near Megalopolis.

==== Roman Republic ====
- Sardinia and Corsica are made a combined province. Rome appoints, and in the future annually elects, two praetors (with autocratic consular powers) for this province and for Sicily.
- Gaius Flaminius becomes Rome's first governor of Sicily.

==== Seleucid Empire ====
- Antiochus Hierax tries to raise revolts against his brother Seleucus II in Syria and the east of the Seleucid kingdom. However, he is captured and exiled to Thrace, where he lives as a virtual prisoner.

==== China ====
- The Qin generals Wang Jian, Li Xin and Wang Ben invade the State of Yan in vengeance for an assassination attempt against the king of Qin, Ying Zheng, that had been organized by Crown Prince Dan.

== Births ==
- Publius Cornelius Scipio Nasica, Roman consul and general

== Deaths ==
- Huan Yi, Chinese general of the Qin State (Warring States Period)
- Jing Ke, Chinese retainer and assassin of the Yan State
- Lydiadas of Megalopolis, Greek tyrant and general (strategos)
