= Mufu =

System of recruitment

- Chinese: 幕府
Transcriptions
Standard Mandarin
- Hanyu Pinyin: mùfǔ
Yue: Cantonese
- Jyutping: muk6 fu2

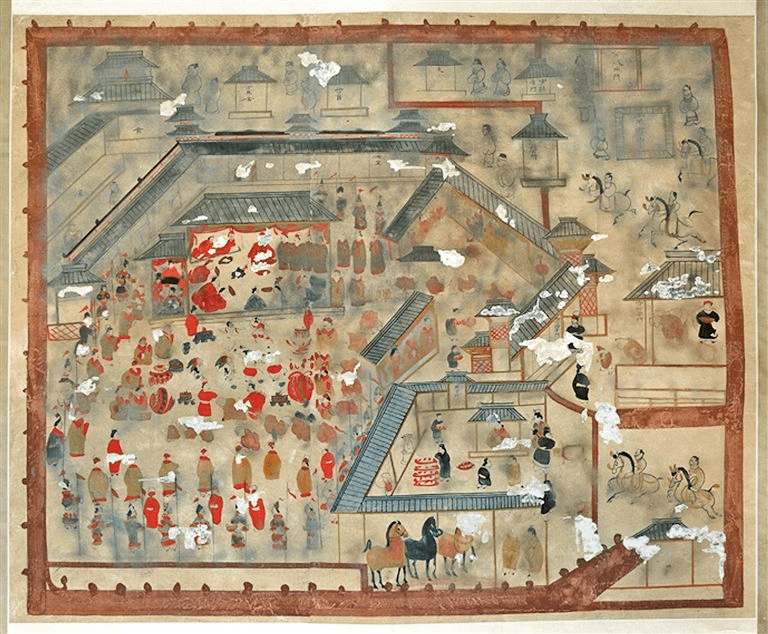
An Eastern Han period Chinese mural of a mufu conducted by the Commandant-protector of the Wuhuan (護烏桓校尉), from a Han tomb in Horinger, Inner Mongolia

Mufu (Chinese: 幕府), a secretariat, was a system for hiring able advisers and military staff, the muliao (幕僚), by and for the imperial Chinese provincial officials.

It dates back to 229 BC, and was used at various times chiefly for organizing a command structure for military officers during campaigns and to serve as a strategic council or think-tank. Notable examples include Li Guang and Wei Qing's mufu during the Han dynasty's campaign against Xiongnu, and Cao Cao's tent government, which included advisers like Guo Jia and Xun You and generals like Xu Huang and Cao Ren during his military campaigns. Luo Guanzhong, the writer of the Romance of the Three Kingdoms was also speculated to have worked as part of Zhang Shicheng's staff.

The system was also adopted in Japan by the shōgun. The Chinese characters (kanji) for mufu (幕府) are pronounced in Japanese as bakufu.

== The term ==
The first Chinese character mu (幕) denotes curtain, and tent, and the second character fu (府) denotes home or government, hence mufu means "tent government". The liao (僚) in muliao denotes bureaucrat, official.

== The system ==
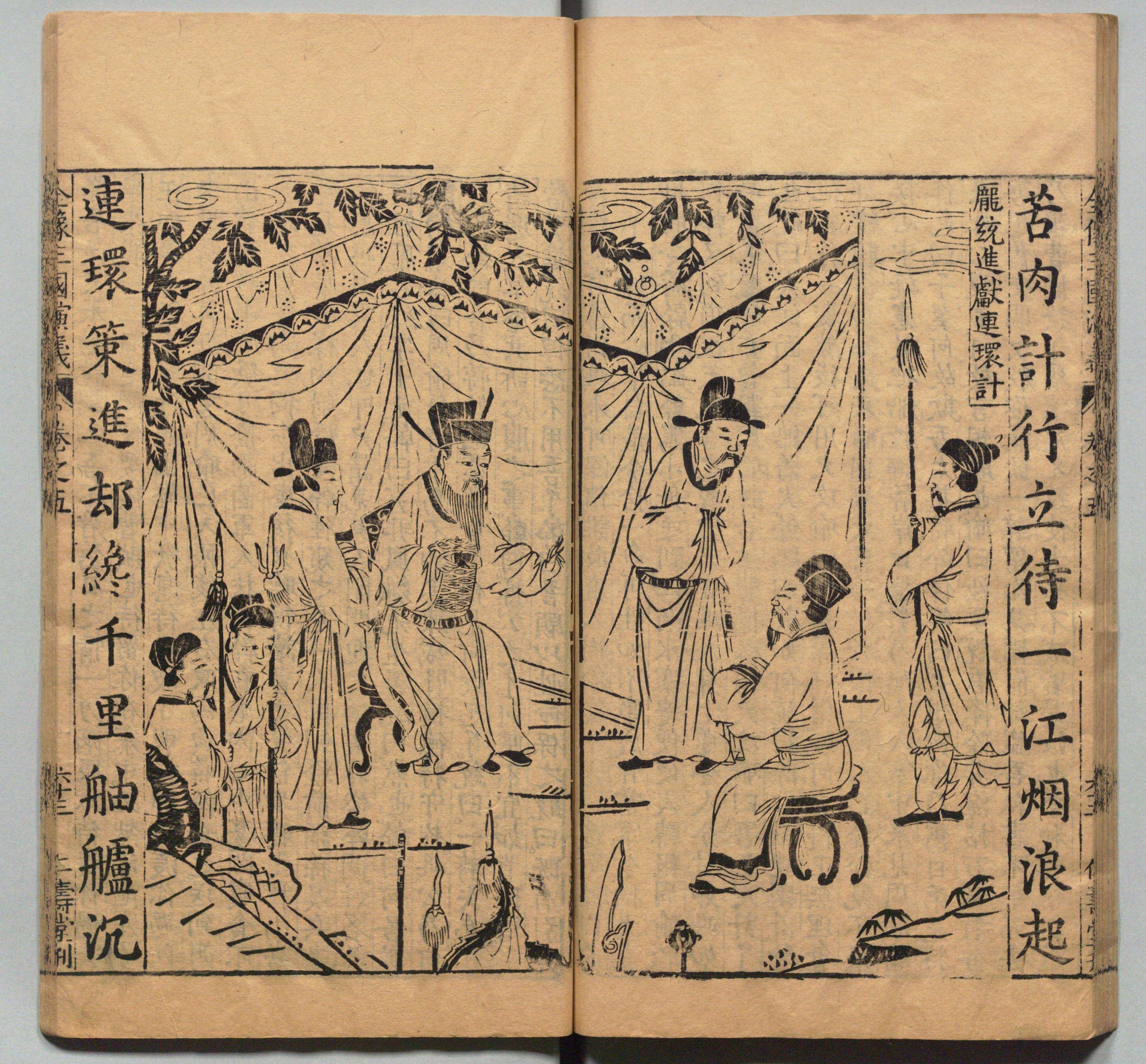
Ming dynasty print of Romance of the Three Kingdoms depicting Cao Cao as chief commander of the Chibi campaign sitting underneath the tent attended by his adjutants and soldiers.

Mufu were generally staffed by private hires, and headed by the official who was responsible for their salaries, bypassing the selection process for personnel from the central government. The salaries would still sometimes be provided by the central government, but can also be depended on the provincial official. Often the official did not have to report to the central government, unless directly called upon or he wanted to promote one of the members in his mufu to a regular position within the government bureaucracy.

While the mufu is beholden to the authority of the central imperial government, it has also led to separatism of the local military governors, later turned warlords, at various points in history when the central government loses its hold on power. Examples include the various power-struggles and coups in the Northern and Southern dynasties and with Tang dynasty's jiedushi. It was also extensively used in the Qing dynasty.

Many shidafu-literati who sought to join often saw the mufu as an alternative way to achieving fame and a successful political career, when other systems like the imperial examination doesn't allow for it. Potentially an able adjutant could leave a name in history as an meritorious and talented official, particularly in times of war and disorder. Li Bai famously served briefly as staff adviser to Prince Yon under his tent for these purposes. Therefore, the mufu system became a well-oiled machine that produced the next generation of officials.

== History ==
As early as the Warring States Period, it referred to the temporary residence of a general commanding in the field. Examples include Li Mu, who was given power to appoint officials and gather local taxes to prepare the soldiers during the Zhao-state's war against the Xiongnu.

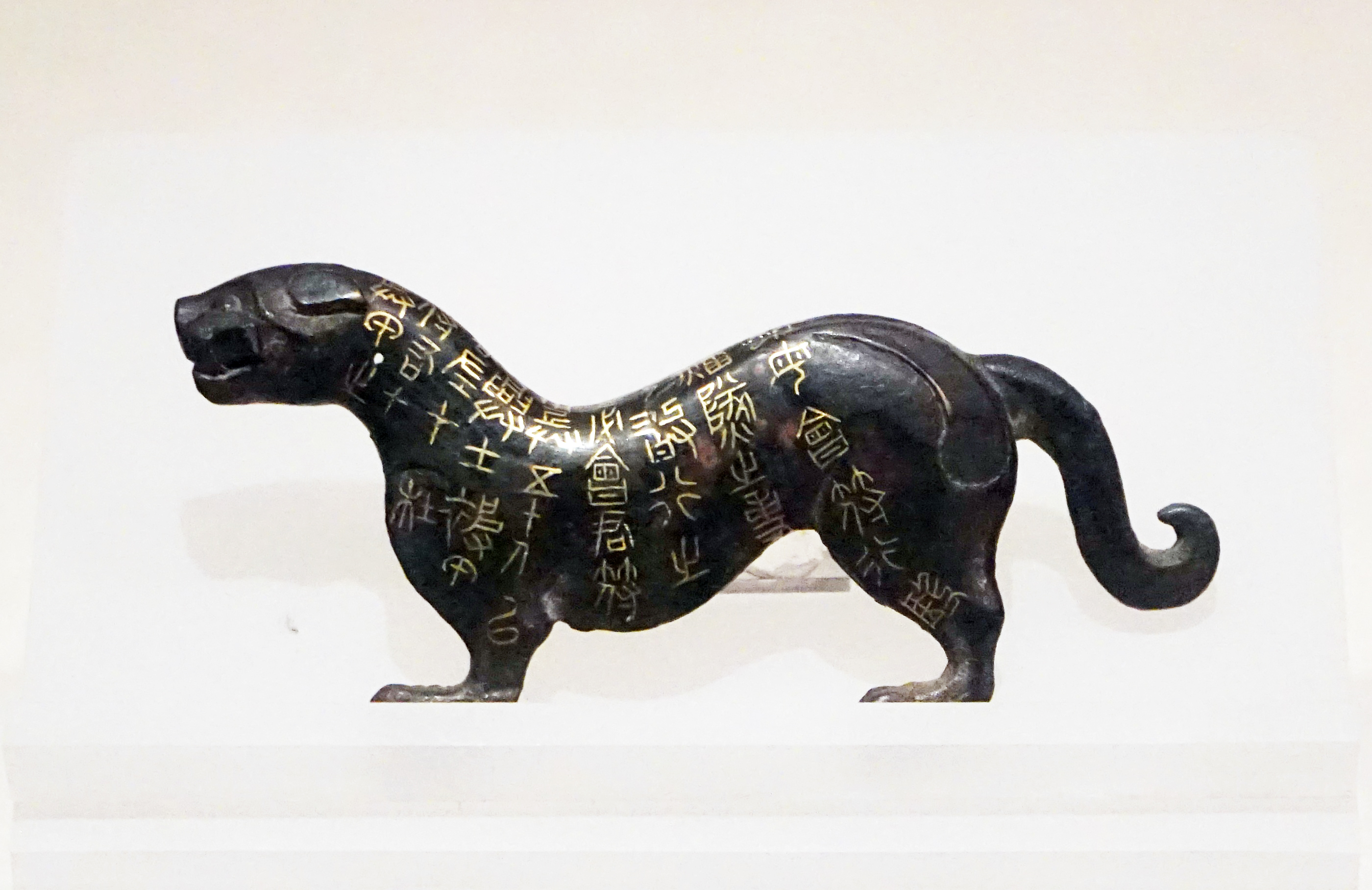
Bronze Tiger-tally of Qin, a symbol of military power given to generals by the imperial government.

Initially, the staff serving under a commanding officer's tent government were similar to that of his retainers in the Spring and Autumn period, but during the Han dynasty it became the sole right for higher officials such as the Three Ducal Ministers and high ranking generals. Later the authority to establish a mufu expanded to regional governors during the late Eastern Han and Three Kingdoms period, becoming an administrative government body in of itself. Often the governors weren't necessarily of military background but were civil government officials. The growing power of provincial governors led to them mostly disregarding the authority of Han emperors and the imperial court, with Cao Cao famously commanding the imperial court in Emperor Xian of Han's stead. By the Jin and Northern and Southern dynasties, coupled with the growing power of landowning aristocratic families, power struggles between regional and central governments became common place. In the Sui and Tang dynasty, the Ministry of Personnel became solely responsible for the appointment of officials, lessening the authority of regional mufu. However, the mufu structure for military organization remained, leading to the growing power of the office of jiedushi (military governor), who maintained military power in various circuits. Imperial princesses such as Princess Pingyang, Princess Taiping and Princess Anle also held their own councils. Over time as Tang imperial government's control over the jiedushi declined, the jiedushi would become their own regional powers, leading to the Five Dynasties and Ten Kingdoms.

During the Song and Ming dynasties, the power of regional tent government was curbed and largely disappeared as central government held greater power over that of regional military. During the Qing dynasty, the tent government became more common. In the late Qing, powerful regional governors greatly modified the traditional mufu system, transforming it into a professional bureaucracy under their personal authority. These mufu could bypass the usual bureaucratic regulations to include members of the emerging capitalist class. Their capital and specialized skills were useful to the running of modern enterprises that were established under the Self-Strengthening Movement, and many Western-trained experts were given considerable responsibilities in this way.

Conventional officials were selected from the successful candidates of the literary imperial examination who had little practical skills to govern, and the Qing central government had no provision to provide them with technical staff since there was no training or recruiting of such experts. To perform their job well, the appointed scholars were forced to hire able men, muliao, to staff the mufu, to deal with floods, rebellions, finance and foreign affairs.

== Examples ==
In Zeng Guofan's mufu, his muliao included Li Hongzhang. In Li Hongzhang's mufu, his muliao included Pan Dingxin, Zhou Fu and Liu Bingzhang.
