= Meng Tian =

Chinese inventor and general (c. 250–210 BC)

- Born: c. 250 BC
- Died: 210 BC (aged 40); Yulin, Shaanxi
- Occupations: Inventor; general
- Father: Meng Wu
- Relatives: Meng Yi (brother); Bu Xianglian (wife); Meng Yeng (son)

Chinese name
- Traditional Chinese: 蒙恬
- Simplified Chinese: 蒙恬
Transcriptions
Standard Mandarin
- Hanyu Pinyin: Méng Tián
- Wade–Giles: Mêng^{2} T'ien^{2}
- IPA: [mə̌ŋ tʰjɛ̌n]
Yue: Cantonese
- Yale Romanization: Mùhng Tìhm
- Jyutping: Mung4 Tim4
- IPA: [mʊŋ˩ tʰim˩]

Meng Tian (c. 250 – c. August/September 210 BC) was a Chinese inventor and general of the Qin dynasty who distinguished himself in campaigns against the Xiongnu and in the construction of the Great Wall of China. He was the elder brother of Meng Yi. He descended from a great line of military officials and architects. His grandfather, Meng Ao, was a general from the era of King Zhao, while his father, Meng Wu, served as deputy to Wang Jian.

== Life ==
In 224 BC, having recently conquered Wei, the Qin king Ying Zheng appointed Li Xin as commander-in-chief and Meng Tian as his vice-general to lead a 200,000 strong army in an assault against Chu. The invasion was successful at first, Meng Tian's army took Qigui but then, both Li Xin's and Meng Tiang's armies were effectively annihilated by Chu troops under Xiang Yan and Lord Changping. Following this defeat, Ying Zheng appointed Qin generals Wang Jian and Meng Wu as commanders of a 600,000 Qin army in order to finally achieve the conquest of Chu.

By the time the Qin state conquered the other six states and began its reign over a unified China in 221 BC, the nomadic Xiongnu had grown into a powerful invading force in the north and started expanding both east and west. Qin Shi Huang, the first emperor of the Qin dynasty, sent a 300,000-strong army headed by Meng Tian to drive the Xiongnu northward for 1,000 li (about 416 km) and began work on what has become known as the Great Wall to guard against invasion. The defensive works he began were said to extend over 10,000 li (4,158 km) "from Lintao to Liaodong and even extended across the Yellow River and through Yangshan and Beijia.", that is, from the southwest corner of the Ordos Loop to the Yellow Sea. Yangshan and Beijia are hard to locate, but the wall ran along the Yellow River and included all of the Ordos Loop.

Meng Tian's ingenuity can be seen in the efficient (though inhumane) building policy, the consideration of topography, and the utilisation of natural barriers. Meng Tian supervised the construction of a road system linking the former Yan, Qi, Wu and Chu areas, as well as a number of roads especially for imperial use. The system eventually formed played an extremely important role in ancient transportation and economic exchanges. He is also traditionally, if erroneously, credited with having invented the "Ink brush" (毛筆) and is specially remembered at the "Huzhou Pen Festival", which developed from festivities at his ancestor temple. Meng Tian is also credited with inventing the guzheng (筝), a bridge zither with twelve or thirteen strings.

When Fusu, Qin Shi Huang's eldest son and the crown prince, was exiled to work at the northern border for disputing his father's policies, Meng Tian was ordered to assist the prince — a task he had accomplished loyally. When Qin Shi Huang died, Meng Tian's death was caused by Zhao Gao who forged a letter from Qin Shi Huang. He was forced to commit suicide in prison, and his family was killed. Three years after his death, the Qin dynasty collapsed.

== In popular culture and legacy ==
Meng Tian sometimes appears as a door god in Chinese and Taoist temples, usually paired with Fusu.

He is one of the 32 historical figures who appear as special characters in the video game Romance of the Three Kingdoms XI by Koei. He also appears as a non-playable character in Prince of Qin.

In the manga series Kingdom, Meng Tian is known as "Mou Ten", a Qin General and the eldest son of Great General Mou Bu (Meng Wu). He looks different from his father and his younger brother Mou Ki. He has a feminine appearance, with shoulder length black orange hair and a pink robe over his armor. He usually leads his forces alongside Wang Ben/Ou Hon and Li Xin/Ri Shin, but his tactical expertise is higher and better known due to him being a graduate of the Strategist Academy and the top student under Lord Changping's school. He acts as a referee or peacekeeper for Wang Ben/Ou Hon and Li Xin/Shin, who are shown to despise each other and argue constantly in the series.

== See also ==
- Huzhou ink brush, first developed by Meng Tian.
