= Kingdom (manga) =

Japanese manga series and its franchise

- First tankōbon volume cover, featuring Li Xin

キングダム (Kingudamu)
- Genre: Epic; Historical; Military
- Manga
- Written by: Yasuhisa Hara
- Published by: Shueisha
- English publisher: NA: Viz Media
- Imprint: Young Jump Comics
- Magazine: Weekly Young Jump
- Original run: January 26, 2006 – present
- Volumes: 81
- Anime television series
- Directed by: Jun Kamiya (S1); Akira Iwanaga (S2); Kenichi Imaizumi (S3–S6); Kazuya Monma (S3 & S4) (Note: Monma participated as Series Director (シリーズディレクター) for the third and fourth seasonss, and is credited as Assistant Director (助監督) in the fifth season.)
- Produced by: Izumi Nakazawa (S1 & S2); Mirai Miyamoto (S3); Ryousuke Hagiwara (S3); Ryōsuke Mori (S3); Tomokazu Iizumi (S3–S6); Mayumi Kurashima (S4 & S5); Kazuhiro Iwami (S4 & S5); Yousuke Tamura (S4–S6); Keita Takao (S5); Akari Yanagawa (S6); Takashi Ikeda (S6)
- Written by: Naruhisa Arakawa (S1 & S2); Noboru Takagi (S3–S6)
- Music by: Minako Seki (S1 & S2); Hiroyuki Sawano (S3–S6); Kohta Yamamoto (S3–S6)
- Studio: Pierrot; IKIF+ (S1 & S2) (Note: Although not co-credited alongside Pierrot, IKIF+ was responsible for the series' extensive usage of CG animation for characters and backgrounds in the first season (and to a lesser extent in the second season).); Studio Signpost (S3–S6); DandeLion Animation Studio (S3–S6) (Note: CG animation.)
- Licensed by: Crunchyroll: SEA: Plus Media Networks Asia (S3–)
- Original network: NHK BS Premium, NHK General TV
- Original run: June 4, 2012 – present
- Episodes: 155
- Live-action films
- Kingdom (2019); Kingdom 2: Far and Away (2022); Kingdom 3: The Flame of Destiny (2023); Kingdom 4: Return of the Great General (2024); Kingdom 5: The Clash of Souls (2026)
- icon

Kingdom (Japanese: キングダム, Hepburn: Kingudamu) is a Japanese manga series written and illustrated by Yasuhisa Hara. It has been serialized in Shueisha's seinen manga magazine Weekly Young Jump since January 2006, with its chapters collected in 81 tankōbon volumes as of November 2026. The series is a fictionalized account of the Warring States period primarily through the experiences of the war orphan Li Xin and his comrades as he fights to become the greatest general under the heavens, and in doing so, unifying China for the first time in 500 years. The manga has been licensed for English release in North America by Viz Media.

The series was adapted into a six-season anime television series by studio Pierrot. The first 38-episode season aired from June 2012 to February 2013; a second 39-episode season aired from June 2013 to March 2014; a third 26-episode season by Studio Signpost and Pierrot aired from April 2020 to October 2021; a fourth 26-episode season aired from April to October 2022; a fifth 13-episode season aired from January to March 2024. A sixth season aired from October to December 2025. A continuation of the sixth season has been announced. The anime has been licensed for English-language release by Crunchyroll.

A live-action film was released in April 2019; a sequel film premiered in July 2022; a third film premiered in July 2023; a fourth film was released in July 2024; and a fifth film premiered in July 2026.

By November 2026, the Kingdom manga had over 130 million copies in circulation, making it one of the best-selling manga series of all time. In 2013, the manga won the Grand Prize of the Tezuka Osamu Cultural Prize.

== Synopsis ==
=== Historical context ===
The story of Kingdom is a fictional adaptation of the Chinese history period known as the Warring States period, which ended in 221 BC when Ying Zheng, king of Qin, succeeded in conquering the other states and unifying China.

Several of the characters are based on historical figures. Many characters will take the names of people in history and other times they will have completely different names; oftentimes, this is the result of Japanese kanji borrowing from Chinese characters, and some Chinese names have no equivalent characters in kanji.

=== Plot ===
Born during the Warring States period of ancient China, Xin and Piao are war orphans working as servants in a poor village in the kingdom of Qin. However, they dream of becoming the "Great Generals of the Heavens" and train daily. One day, Piao is taken to the palace for an unknown purpose by a minister and Xin is left behind. A few months later, Piao returns to the village on the verge of death, urging Xin to travel to another village. There, Xin meets a boy nearly identical to Piao, Ying Zheng the current King of Qin. Xin learns that Piao served as a bodydouble for Ying Zheng and was mortally wounded in a power struggle for the throne. Though initially furious at Ying Zheng for causing Piao's death, Xin decides to seize the opportunity and aids Ying Zheng in ousting his younger half-brother Cheng Jiao and reclaiming the Qin throne. Successful in this endeavor, Xin starts his military life as a Qin soldier and then commander on the battlefields of the warring states of China. He relentlessly pursues his goal of becoming the "Greatest General in the World", also helping King Zheng of Qin achieve his dream of unification to end the incessant warfare once and for all.

== Characters ==
Li Xin (李信, Ri Shin)
Voiced by: Masakazu Morita (Japanese); Cole Howard (seasons 1–2), Stephen Fu (season 3–present) (English)
Xin (Shin in the Japanese version) is an orphan boy who grew up as a servant with his best friend Piao. Xin's behavior is predominantly impulsive, however, he inspires his comrades and those around him. After Piao's death, Xin decides to help the King of Qin, Ying Zheng, escape his enemies with the help of He Liao Diao. Xin enlists in the State of Qin army, and after demonstrating his determination and abilities, General Wang Qi appoints him as the leader of a special 100-man Fei Xin Unit. Appointing Qiang Lei and Yuan as his lieutenants, Xin joins Wang Qi in his attack on the State of Zhao. He develops great respect for Ying Zheng and their paths become interlocked. Following the invasion of the Wei State, he is made leader of a 1,000-man unit.
Ying Zheng (嬴政, Ei Sei)
Voiced by: Jun Fukuyama (Japanese); Micah Solusod (seasons 1–2), Brian Doe-Chua (season 3–present) (English)
Ying Zheng is the 31st king of the State of Qin. He states that he will unify all of China but has only a few years to do so. There are enemies that lay beyond the Qin state (Zhao, Wei, Chu, and other nations) and internal problems with his political rivals, minister Lu Buwei, who plans to take over the throne, and the Queen Dowager. Although king, Ying Zheng has not been crowned, so his power is limited. His and Xin's goals became unified when Xin declares that he would be Ying Zheng's "sword" in the unification of China. He has a child named Lì with the servant woman Xiàng.
Li Piao (李漂, Ri Hyō)
Voiced by: Jun Fukuyama (Japanese); Micah Solusod (seasons 1–2), Brian Doe-Chua (season 3–present) (English)
Xin's childhood best friend and fellow war orphan, Piao also aims to become a general renowned throughout all of China. His appearance is identical to King Ying Zheng and he is offered a position in the Qin palace as Zheng's body double. He accepts the position, only to die fighting at the hands of an assassin hired by the Cheng Jiao Faction. Piao is a fictional character created by the author and does not exist in history.
He Liao Diao (河了貂, Ka Ryō Ten)
Voiced by: Rie Kugimiya (Japanese); Shannon Chan-Kent (seasons 1–2), Courtney Lin (season 3–present) (English)
He Liao Diao is a young girl and the last descendant of a mountain tribe, but she keeps her identity a secret and dresses as a male. She joins Xin in helping Ying Zheng escape from Liu Bu's soldiers. After witnessing Wang Qi and Xin's war against Zhao, she tells Shin that she will join the State of Qin Army, but he only laughs. He Liao Diao is taken in as an apprentice of strategic warfare, and later in the story, she becomes the strategist for the Fei Xin Unit. It is hinted that she has romantic feelings for Xin, however, he sees their relationship as more like brother and sister.
Qiang Lei (羌瘣, Kyō Kai)
Voiced by: Yōko Hikasa (Japanese); Francesca Calo (season 3–present) (English)
Qiang Lei is a superb swordswoman and an efficient killer. She is a former member of the Chi You, a female assassin group in which they advance the expense of killing rival candidates. After the death of her older sister, Qiang Xiang, in a rigged series of deathmatches, Qiang Lei vowed revenge against the woman who killed her. She joined the Fei Xin Unit after its formation and became a vice commander, keeping her gender a secret. She is naive in the ways of the world but is much smarter than Xin and he relies on her for battle strategies as well as her sword skills. After Xin discovers her identity, she becomes more friendly and open towards him and she accepts her place in the unit, calling it her home. Her identity is revealed to the rest of the Fei Xin Unit after she is severely wounded in the battle against the Wei State. It is implied that she may have romantic feelings for Xin.
Changwen Jun (昌文君, Shōbun Kun)
Voiced by: Yutaka Nakano (Japanese); Mick Lauer (season 3–present) (English)
Lord Changwen was formerly a skilled warrior during the reign of King Zhaoxiang of Qin who worked his way up to be one of Qin's Chancellors along with Lord Changping. He is also a senior adviser of the king. He is extremely loyal to Ying Zheng, aiding him in both reclaiming the throne and in the political struggle against Ying's rival, Lü Buwei.
Bi (壁, Heki)
Voiced by: Kōji Yusa (Japanese); Nicholas Leung (season 3–present) (English)
Lord Changwen's loyal subordinate. Initially, Bi was a 1,000-man commander who rose to the 3000-man commander and finally rises to the rank of General after contributing to many of Qin's military campaigns along with Xin. Xin is shown to rely on him, and he has had a crush on Yang Duan He since their first meeting.
Wang Qi (王騎, Ō Ki)
Voiced by: Rikiya Koyama (Japanese); John Novak (seasons 1–2) (English)
Based on the real-life Qin general Wang Yi, Wang Qi was the last remaining "Six Great Generals" in the time of King Zhaoxiang of Qin. One of Qin's best generals even at the time of Ying Zheng's coronation, he trained and honed Li Xin's battle and leadership skills and also christened his unit the "Fei Xin Unit". During the Mayang Campaign, Wang Qi faces off against Pang Nuan, one of Zhao's Three Great Generals and the murderer of his fiancé and fellow Six Greats, Liao. Before he can finish Pang Nuan off he is shot from behind with an arrow, allowing Pang Nuan to stab his heart. Despite being mortally wounded he manages to continue fighting before retreating with Xin and his him. Away from the battle, Wang Qi gives Xin his glaive before finally succumbing to his wounds.
Wang Ben (王賁, Ō Hon)
Voiced by: Yoshimasa Hosoya
Son of the current Wang family patriarch and Qin great general, Wang Jian. Future heir of the Wang family and relative of the late-Qin great general, Wang Qi. Staunch and strict, does not joke around like Meng Tian or Xin. Very accomplished cavalrymen with top-notch spear skills. Fighting for contention of becoming the next "great general" together with Xin and Meng Tian. Commander of his unit, the "Ye Feng Unit" comprising mostly cavalrymen of nobility origins.
Meng Tian (蒙恬, Mō Ten)
Voiced by: Hirofumi Nojima (Japanese); Matt Hill (seasons 1–2), Howard Wang (season 3–present) (English)
Meng Tian was the son of one of the Qin's "Great Six General", Meng Wu, grandson of the old general Meng Ao, brother of Meng Yi and commander of his unit, the Ye Hua Unit. Often shown to be rather jovial, someone who does not take things seriously and an extrovert who even befriends even the other unit commanders who were also fighting to be generals like Xin and Wang Ben. Also often seen to be wearing flamboyant outfits that are more fitting for an aristocrat while on the battlefield and his unit also follows his style of often being portrayed as a "joker" unit, not being serious of sorts. However, when battle commences, Meng Tian was often proven to be a real swordsman which has impeccable skills and also great leadership skills and excellent tactical planning skills where he can turn the mood of his own forces up quickly from being inactive to a full-on, effective fighting force and also being able to draw up battle plans not only for his own force but often enough for Xin and sometimes even for Wang Ben if their paths met on the battlefield.
Lü Buwei (呂不韋, Ryo Fui)
Voiced by: Tesshō Genda (Japanese); Brent Mukai (season 3–present) (English)
Lü Buwei initially started as a prominent and influential trader from Zhao. After helping the prince of Qin, Prince Sou Jou (King Zhuangxiang) to escape captivity from Zhou's hands, gained the position of "Minister of the Right" once Zhuangxiang was promoted to "King". While helping Zhuangxiang to gain power to ascend to king, started to bribe everyone he could and even offered his own fiance up to Zhuangxiang as his concubine. Over time he would usurp more power in the courts and made himself the chancellor of Qin while struggling for power against Ying Zheng.
Yang Duan He (楊端和, Yō Tan Wa)
Voiced by: Sonozaki Mie (Japanese); Marissa Lenti (season 3–present) (English)
Yang Duan He is the Mountain King of the mountainous tribes that borders Qin. She initially treated Xin and Ying Zheng with discontent due to how the previous Qin administration had neglected them after their treaty of co-existence lapsed for 400 years. After listening to Zheng's ambitions of unification as well as promising better relationships with the mountain tribes, Yang Duan decided to trust Zheng and the Qin again and followed Zheng's advice on leading the mountainous tribespeople into a newer world. Revealed to be a woman and she continued consolidating all the other loose tribes into one unified entity under her leadership. Would also pass on the information on Zhao's pacification on the Xiongnu to the north of Zhao's territory which in turn would bear their northern cavalry units down to Bayou Plains to face off with Wang Qi.
Li Mu (李牧, Ri Boku)
Voiced by: Toshiyuki Morikawa (Japanese); Chris Hackney (season 3–present) (English)
Li Mu is one of the "Three Greats of Zhao" and one of the major antagonists of the series. Initially shown to be aloof and jovial, he soon reveals himself to be a top-notch strategist on the battlefield, even strategizing and claiming the life of Wang Qi at the climactic battle on the Mayang plains between Zhao and Qin.
Lian Po (廉頗, Ren Pa)
Voiced by: Naomi Kusumi (Japanese); Brian Dobson (seasons 1–2), Keith Silverstein (season 3) (English)
Lian Po was one of Zhao's "Three Great Generals". After being stripped of his military command by the new king of Sho, King Daoxiang, Lian Po rebelled and brought his lieutenants and other officers that survived the rebellion into Wei as an exile. However, when Qin and Zhao entered an alliance that caused Qin to invade Wei, Lian Po was asked by King Jingmin of Wei to command the entire Wei army against Qin. Lian Po eventually still failed and after the defeat, was again exiled to Chu.

== Media ==
=== Manga ===
Written and illustrated by Yasuhisa Hara, Kingdom has been serialized in Shueisha's seinen manga magazine Weekly Young Jump since January 26, 2006. Shueisha has collected its chapters into individual tankōbon volumes. The first volume was released on May 19, 2006. In 2015, Hara stated that he has planned to extend the series up to 100 volumes. As of November 18, 2026, 81 volumes have been released.

Before Kingdom, Hara published four prototype one-shot chapters: "Kongo" (金剛) (November 18, 2003); (Note: Published in Young Jump Zōkan Mankaku volume 36, released on November 18, 2003.) "Uma Shuhei San-hyaku" (馬酒兵三百; 'Horse and Liquor for 300 Soldiers') (January 15, 2004); (Note: Published in Young Jump Zōkan Mankaku volume 37, released on January 15, 2004.) "Li Mu" (李牧) (April 1, 2004); (Note: Published in Weekly Young Jump's 18th issue of 2004, released on April 1 of that same year.) and "Meng Wu and Chu Zi" (蒙武と楚子, Mō Bu to So Shi") (December 2, 2004). (Note: Published in Weekly Young Jump's first issue of 2005, released on December 2, 2004.) The four chapters were later collected in Kingdom Omnibus (キングダム総集編, Kingudamu Sōshūhen), a two-volume edition released on June 5 and June 26, 2012, respectively.

In February 2025, Viz Media announced that it licensed the series for English publication in North America starting on November 11 of that same year. The series is also published on its Shonen Jump digital service following each volume's release.

=== Anime ===
An anime television series was adapted by studio Pierrot. Two seasons of seventy-seven episodes were produced. The first season which consisted of thirty-eight episodes aired from June 4, 2012, to February 25, 2013, on NHK BS Premium. The first season was directed by Jun Kamiya, written by Naruhisa Arakawa, featured music composed by Minako Seki, and was produced by Izumi Nakazawa. The series' characters were designed by Atsuo Tobe, Noriko Otake, and Masatoshi Hakanda.

A second season aired thirty-nine episodes from June 8, 2013, to March 1, 2014. The season featured returning staff Minako Seki and Naruhisa Arakawa, the first season's composer and writer, respectively. Akira Iwanaga replaced Jun Kamiya as director, Izumi Nakazawa served as series producer, and the character designs were handled by Itsuko Takeda, Kumiko Tokunaga, and Makoto Shimojima. The anime was licensed for English language release by Funimation outside of Asia. Following Sony's acquisition of Crunchyroll, the series was moved to Crunchyroll.

On November 8, 2019, a third season of the series was announced, and that the series would feature an entirely new production team, and that the season would cover the manga's Coalition Invasion arc. The series' third season has Kenichi Imaizumi directing at Pierrot and Pierrot's subsidiary company Studio Signpost, with scripts by Noboru Takagi and character designs by Hisashi Abe. Hiroyuki Sawano and Kohta Yamamoto composed the music. The season premiered on April 6, 2020. On April 26, 2020, the anime production committee announced that episode 5 and onwards of the third series would be postponed by the COVID-19 pandemic. The third season restarted broadcasting from its first episode on April 5, 2021, and finished on October 18 of the same year, airing twenty-six episodes. Unlike with the series' first two seasons, the third season of Kingdom was made using traditional 2D animation, rather than CGI animation. Composers Sawano and Yamamoto were brought onto the project as a personal request from Yasuhisa Hara himself. Director Imaizumi, in meetings with the composers, opted to not use traditional Chinese instruments despite the series' setting, and they instead decided on using modern instrumentations.

At the end of the third season's final episode, a fourth season was announced. It aired for twenty-six episodes from April 10 to October 2, 2022. The cast returned to reprise their roles.

A fifth season was announced at the end of the fourth season. It was originally planned to premiere on January 7, 2024, but the premiere was delayed by a week due to the channel coverage of the Noto earthquake, eventually airing for thirteen episodes from January 14 to March 31 of the same year.

A sixth season was announced in April 2025, which aired from October 5 to December 28 of the same year.

After the ending of the sixth season, a sequel was announced.

=== Films ===
On April 17, 2016, a special short movie was posted online by Shueisha. It is a live-action promotional short film for the series, made for the manga's 10th anniversary. It was filmed in Hengdian World Studios in China.

In April 2018, Kingdom's author, Yasuhira Hara, revealed that a full-length live-action film of the series had been green-lit. The author stated he took part in script meetings, praising the 'satisfying' screenplay, the 'unprecedented' budget, and everyone in the 'ultra-grand' casts, starring Kento Yamazaki and directed by Shinsuke Sato. The film was released on April 19, 2019. In total, it generated ¥5.73 billion in box office revenue within Japan and $50.57 million worldwide.

A second film, Kingdom 2: Far and Away (キングダム2 遥かなる大地へ, Kingudamu 2 Harukanaru Daichi e), was announced to be green-lit on May 28, 2020, with Shinsuke Sato returning as director, and the core cast returning to reprise their roles. The film premiered on July 15, 2022. It generated ¥5.16 billion in box office revenue within Japan.

A third film was announced, with Shinsuke Sato and much of the cast returning. Titled Kingdom 3: The Flame of Destiny (キングダム 運命の炎, Kingudamu Unmei no Hōno), it was released on July 28, 2023. It generated ¥5.6 billion in box office revenue within Japan.

A fourth film, Kingdom 4: Return of the Great General (キングダム 大将軍の帰還, Kingudamu Daishōgun no Kikan), was released on July 12, 2024. It generated ¥8.03 billion in box office revenue in Japan.

A fifth film, Kingdom 5: The Clash of Souls (キングダム 魂の決戦, Kingudamu Tamashii no Kessen), was released on July 17, 2026.

=== Video games ===
A PlayStation Portable beat 'em up styled video game, titled Kingdom Ikki Tousen No Tsurugi (キングダム 一騎闘千の剣), was released in Japan on November 25, 2010.

A free-to-play mobile game called Kingdom: Seven Flags was released on October 24, 2016, in Japan.

A free-to-play mobile game called Kingdom Ran: Tenkatōitsu e no Michi (キングダム 乱 -天下統一への道-; lit. 'Kingdom War: Road to Unification'), was released on February 22, 2018.

=== Other media ===
A special Kingdom Magazine is set to release by Shueisha on August 19, 2026, as part of the manga's 20th anniversary. The magazine will feature new art by Hara on the cover and include a poster with the same art. It will also feature the results of the manga's third character poll, a lengthy interview with Hara, and a retrospective on the manga's past 20 years.

== Reception ==
=== Sales ===
By April 2017, the Kingdom manga had over 30 million copies in circulation; it had over 38 million copies in circulation by December 2018; over 47 million copies in circulation by November 2019; By December 2020, the manga had over 70 million copies in circulation and its 60th volume was the series' first volume with a first run of 1 million copies. The manga had over 84 million copies in circulation by December 2021; over 87 million copies in circulation by February 2022; over 90 million copies in circulation by June 2022; over 92 million copies in circulation by September 2022; over 95 million copies in circulation by January 2023; over 97 million copies in circulation by April 2023; over 99 million copies in circulation by July 2023; over 100 million copies in circulation by November 2023; (Note: Including digital copies.) over 110 million copies in circulation by December 2024; over 120 million copies in circulation by January 2026; and over 130 million copies in circulation by November 2026.

Kingdom was the fifth best-selling manga of 2015, with over 8.5 million copies sold. It was the third best-selling manga of 2016, with over 6.5 million copies sold. It was the third best-selling manga of 2017, with over 6.1 million copies sold. It was the sixth best-selling manga of 2018, with over 4.9 million copies sold. Kingdom was the third best selling manga in 2019, with over 7.6 million copies sold. Kingdom was the second best-selling manga series in 2020, with over 8.2 million copies sold. It was the ninth best selling manga in 2021, with over 4.6 million copies sold. Volumes 67–69 were among the best-selling manga volumes of 2023. Volume 70 was Shueisha's fourth highest first print run manga volume of 2023–2024 (period from April 2023–March 2024), with 950,000 copies printed.

=== Awards and accolades ===
Kingdom was the grand prize winner for the Tezuka Osamu Cultural Prize in 2013 with one judge commenting, "I can't remember the last time I read nearly 30 volumes (of a manga title) in a row feeling this excited." Kingdom won the first annual Tsutaya Comic Awards' All-Time Best Section in 2017. Kingdom has ranked on the "Book of the Year" list from Media Factory's Da Vinci magazine, where professional book reviewers, bookstore employees, and Da Vinci readers participate; it ranked 46th in 2015; 26th in 2016; seventh in 2018; it topped the list in 2019; it ranked 11th in 2020; 15th in 2021; 16th in 2022; 18th in 2023; and 23rd in 2025. On TV Asahi's Manga Sōsenkyo 2021 poll, in which 150,000 people voted for their top 100 manga series, Kingdom ranked thirteenth.

The manga earned a Guinness World Record on December 12, 2012, for Manga written by the most people. The record was due to its "Social Kingdom" campaign in which fans and other artists were given the task of redrawing the entire 26th volume. Participants included manga creators Eiichiro Oda (One Piece), Masashi Kishimoto (Naruto), Hirohiko Araki (JoJo's Bizarre Adventure), Takehiko Inoue (Slam Dunk), Hiroshi Motomiya (Salary Man Kintaro), as well as voice actors and fans. The Social Kingdom campaign was one of the Entertainment Division's Jury Recommended Works at the 16th Japan Media Arts Festival in 2012.
