= Meng Wu =

3rd-century BCE Chinese general

Meng Wu 蒙武
- Born: Unknown
- Died: Unknown
- Occupation: Military general
- Children: Meng Tian; Meng Yi
- Father: Meng Ao

Meng Wu (Chinese: 蒙武, fl. 3rd century BCE) was a general in the state of Qin during the Warring States period, who played a major role in the conquest of Chu.

He was a son of Meng Ao and the father of Meng Tian and Meng Yi, all Qin generals.

== Biography ==
The son of Meng Ao, Meng Wu was part of his father's campaign against the state of Qi in 285 BC. In 224 BC, having recently conquered Wei, the Qin king Ying Zheng appointed Li Xin and Meng Tian (according to some records it was Meng Wu himself and not his son Meng Tian) to lead 200,000 men in a two-pronged attack against Chu. Meng Wu/Meng Tian's army took Qigui but Li Xin's army was effectively annihilated by Chu troops under Xiang Yan and Lord Changping. Following this setback, Ying Zheng appointed Wang Jian as the overall commander of the army against Chu, this time with 600,000 men. Meng Wu was appointed lieutenant general (baijiang 裨將).

He served in 224 BC as lieutenant general under Wang Jian during the conquest of Chu, and killed the Chu King Lord Changping, putting an end to the Chu state.

After the unification, Meng Wu continued with the occupation of the south, subdued the Hundred Yue tribes and founded the commandery of Kuaiji.

== In popular culture ==
In the anime and manga "Kingdom", he goes by the name "Mou Bu", former member of the 'Four Pillars of Ryo' and the first great of the new appointed "Qin Six Great Generals", a relentless warrior who aims to become the strongest in all China by displaying his martial might in the battlefield, he's also the son of 'Mou Gou' and father of 'Mou Ten' and 'Mou Ki'. In a one-shot that Hara Yasuhisa published before Kingdom's serialization, it portrays him as a childhood friend of Lord Changping (Shou Hei Kun) and his conflicted feelings towards his friend once the latter deserts Qin for his homeland of Chu.
