= Lord Changping =

Last king of Chinese state of Chu during 223 BC

- 昌平君

King of Chu
- In office 223 BC – 223 BC
- Preceded by: Fuchu
- Succeeded by: None

Prime Minister of Qin
- In office 237 BC – 226 BC
- Preceded by: Lü Buwei
- Succeeded by: None

Personal details
- Born: Family name: Ancestral name: Mǐ (羋); Lineage name: Xióng (熊) Given name: Qǐ (启)
- Relations: King Qingxiang of Chu (paternal grandfather); King Kaolie of Chu (father); King Zhaoxiang of Qin (maternal grandfather); King You of Chu, King Ai of Chu and Fuchu (brother)
- Occupation: Military general, monarch, politician

Lord Changping (昌平君; died 223 BC) was a Chinese monarch and politician who remained as an important military commander and lord of Qin, who later departed from the state of Qin and went to the state of Chu where he became the last king of Chu (223 BC) in the last days of the Chinese Warring States period. He was a son of King Kaolie of Chu and a maternal grandson of King Zhaoxiang of Qin, making him a first cousin once removed of Qin Shi Huang.

== Accounts in the Records of the Grand Historian ==
The deeds of Lord Changping was mainly recorded in Vol. 6: Annals of Qin Shi Huang of the Records of the Grand Historian.

In 238 BC, in the State of Qin, a pseudo-eunuch Lao Ai entered into a relationship with Queen Dowager Zhao and plotted against King Zheng of Qin (who would later ascend to Shi Huang, the First Emperor):

The king found out this fact and ordered the chancellor (Lü Buwei) to let Lord Changping and Lord Changwen lead soldiers and attack Lao Ai. They battled at Xianyang (the capital of Qin) and killed hundreds [of the rebels]. [For this deed,] they all received the peerage. Also, all eunuchs who battled [against Lao Ai] received one higher peerage than before.

Although Lao Ai fled from this battle, he was ultimately captured and executed.

In 226 BC, Lord Changping moved to Ying (the capital of Chu).

In 224 BC, King Zheng of Qin appointed General Li Xin and his vice-commander General Meng Tian in charge of a 200,000 strong army with the task of conquering the Chu state. After some initial success, the invasion was successfully stopped by both Lord Changping and General Xiang Yan, when they managed to wipe out most of the Qin army, killing thousands, as well as some of their top commanders. After this defeat, the Qin King put General Wang Jian in charge of a 600,000-strong Qin army to finally achieve the conquest of Chu. Wang went on to capture its king (Fuchu) and capital. The remnants, however, continued to resist by adopting Lord Changping as their new king:

Xiang Yan, general of Jing (another name of Chu), adopted Lord Changping as the king of Jing and resisted against Qin at Huainan. In the 24th year (223 BC), commander in chief General Wang Jian and his vice-commander General Meng Wu assaulted Chu and after some major battles they defeated the Chu army led by Lord Changping and General Xiang Yan. Lord Changping was killed by Meng Wu and Xiang Yan finally put an end to himself.

In contrast, Vol. 40: House of Chu records Fuchu as the last king of Chu and does not mention Lord Changping. Furthermore, the order of events is utterly reversed compared to the accounts in Vol. 6; the army of Qin killed General Xiang Yan in 224 BC and then captured Fuchu in 223 BC.

== Other references ==
His name was not recorded but some archaeologists associate him with a prime minister Shao (召) of Qin.

According to the modern historian Li Kaiyuan (李開元), his given name was Qi (启), his ancestral name Mi (芈) and his lineage name Xiong (熊) were those of the kings of Chu. He was the son of King Kaolie of Chu. Lord Changping's three predecessors were all his brothers: King You, King Ai, and Fuchu. He died from an arrow wound.

== In popular culture ==
In the manga series Kingdom by Yasuhisa Hara, he is known as Shou Hei Kun, where he is depicted as one of China's finest strategists and a mighty warrior. He serves as Chief of Military Affairs and Supreme Commander of Qin, as well as Headmaster of the Strategist Academy, where he teaches Meng Tian (Mou Ten), Meng Yi (Mou Ki), and He Liao Diao (Ka Ryou Ten). A former "Pillar of Lü Buwei" (Ryo Fui), he later joins the King's faction, aiding Yíng Zhèng (Ei Sei) in his quest to unify China and securing dominance over Qin. In his youth, he studied under Hu Shang (Ko Shou), a renowned strategist among Qin's Six Great Generals.

In Hara's earlier one-shot manga, Shou Hei Kun is portrayed as a former Qin official who defects to Chu when his homeland faces invasion and he can no longer aid Yíng Zhèng. He is ultimately killed in battle by his former friend, Qin General Meng Wu (Mou Bu).

Lord Changping House of Mi Died: 223 BC
Regnal titles
Preceded by Fuchu	King of Chu; 223 BC	Conquered by Qin
