= Wang Jian (Qin) =

3rd century BC Chinese military general

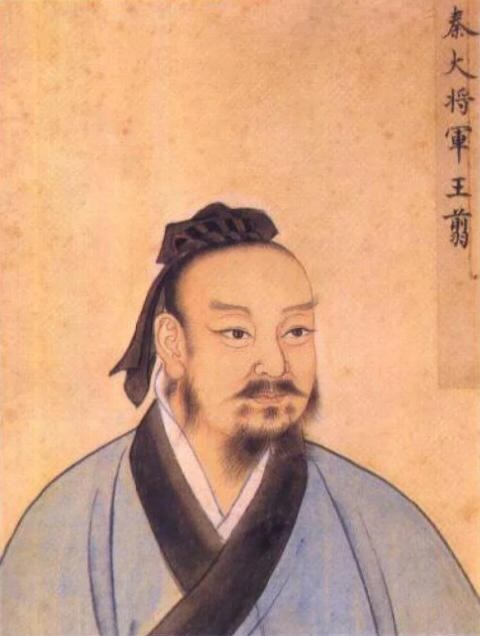
- A Qing dynasty portrait of Wang Jian
- Chinese: 王翦
Transcriptions
Standard Mandarin
- Hanyu Pinyin: Wáng Jiǎn
- Wade–Giles: Wang Chien

Wang Jian (Chinese: 王翦; pinyin: Wáng Jiǎn; fl. 220s BC) was a Chinese military general from the State of Qin during the Warring States period. Under his command, the Qin army conquered the states of Zhao, Yan, and Chu. He is regarded by Chinese modern folklore as one of the four Greatest Generals of the Late Warring States period, along with Bai Qi, Lian Po and Li Mu.

He was born in Dongxiang, Pinyang, Guanzhong (north-east of modern Fuping County, Shaanxi province). His son, Wang Ben, was also an important Qin general.

== Early life ==
According to the New Book of Tang, Wang Jian's original surname was Ji (姬), Wang Jian's 16th-generation patrilineal ancestor was called Prince Qiao (太子晋), who was a son of King Ling of Zhou. Qiao was reduced to civilian status due to his remonstration to his father king, because of the people at the time recognized him as the descendant of the royal family, they called his family the "Wang family" (Wang 王 is the Chinese word for "king"), so Qiao's descendants adopted the surname Wang.

In 236 BC, Wang Jian commanded the Qin army which attacked Zhao and captured nine cities. This action represented the start of King of Qin, Ying Zheng's wars of unification. The Kingdom of Zhao ceased to exist in 228 BC after the Qin government used spies in the Zhao court to have Zhao's leading general Li Mu replaced and then Wang Jian captured Zhao's king.

According to the Shiji, after Jing Ke failed in his attempt to assassinate emperor Qin Shi Huang, the Kingdom of Yan where Jing Ke was a retainer, was conquered by General Wang Jian in 226 BC. A year later, Wang Jian's son Wang Ben conquered the Kingdom of Wei.

== Conquest of Chu, 225–223 BC ==
In 225 BC, only two kingdoms (states) remained independent: Chu and Qin. Chu had recovered significantly enough to mount serious resistance after their disastrous defeats to Qin in 278 BC and losing their centuries-old capital of Ying (Jingzhou). Despite its territorial size, resources and manpower, Chu's fatal flaw was its largely corrupt government that mostly overturned the legalistic-style reforms of Wu Qi from a century and a half earlier, when Wu Qi transformed Chu into the most powerful state with an area of almost half of all the other states combined. Wu Qi was from the same state (Wei) as Shang Yang, whose legalistic reforms turned Qin into an invincible war machine.

The King of Qin, Ying Zheng (later became Qin Shi Huang), decided to finally defeat the remnants of the Chu state located in Huaiyang. According to Shiji's chapter on the great generals of the Warring States, Ying Zheng had first requested his general Wang Jian to lead the invasion, and further inquired as to the military strength needed for the siege. Wang Jian stated that he needed a force of 600,000 men for the invasion. However, when the same question was posed to general Li Xin, he requested only 200,000 men. Ying Zheng accepted Li Xin's advice and appointed him commander in chief of a 200,000 army with general Meng Tian as second in command. Wang Jian decided to retire, claiming ill health. The first Qin invasion initially appeared successful but ended up in a major disaster when the 200,000 Qin army was annihilated by a combined attack of 500,000 Chu troops led by General Xiang Yan and another army under the direct command of Lord Changping, at the Battle of Chengfu in the unfamiliar territory of Huaiyang (modern-day northern Jiangsu and Anhui provinces). Ying Zheng recalled Wang Jian, who finally agreed to lead the second invasion force after being allocated the force of 600,000 men that he had earlier requested.

Before the campaign, during a personal meeting with the Qin king in the send-off ceremony, Wang Jian purposely demand huge rewards for the future victories in a deliberately shameless way. Wang repeated such actions several times later during the campaign. He later explained to his men that the Qin king is always distrustful towards his subordinates, especially Wang Jian who were in command of a huge army - a convenient means to start a revolt against the king at any time. Therefore, Wang had to placate the king by making such shameless demands as a way to show that Wang only had petty material desires and did not dream of the throne.

In 224 BC, Wang Jian began the second invasion of Chu. Chu's morale had greatly increased after their success the previous year. The Chu forces were content to wait and defend their territory. Wang Jian tricked the Chu army by appearing inactive within his fortifications while secretly training his troops to fight in Chu territory. After a year, Chu decided to disband most of their army due to the lack of action. Wang Jian then invaded and overran Huaiyang and the remaining Chu forces. Xiang Yan, the Chu general and Lord of Wu'an, managed to resist the onslaught of Wang Jian and the Qin forces, even though Wang Jian eventually started to take control of the battlefield, both armies inflicted heavy losses on each other during their fierce clash, Xiang Yan was finally defeated by Wang Jian at the battle of Shouchun 壽春 (modern Shouxian 壽縣, Anhui), and withdrew to Qinan 蘄南 (modern Suzhou 宿州, Anhui), where he was killed in battle or committed suicide, and Lord Changping (the last King of Chu) was killed by Wang Jian's second in command, Qin general Meng Wu, father of Meng Tian and Meng Yi. After these events, Chu was then conquered by Qin in 223 BC.

At their peak, the armies of Chu and Qin combined numbered over 1,000,000 troops, more than the massive campaign at Changping between Qin and Zhao 35 years earlier. The excavated personal letters of two Qin regular soldiers, Hei Fu (黑夫) and Jin (惊), records a protracted campaign in Huaiyang under general Wang Jian. Both soldiers wrote letters requesting supplies (clothing) and money from home to sustain the long campaign.

== Later life and descendants ==
Wang Jian later retired due to old age.

Wang Jian's son Wang Ben continued Qin's military conquest against Yan, Dai, and then Qi, ending the Warring States period (221 BCE). Ben's son, Wang Li (王離), served as a subordinate of Meng Tian at the northern borders, then served under Zhang Han during Zhang's punitive campaigns against the revolts at the end of Qin dynasty. Li was probably captured and killed at the Battle of Julu, although neither Records of the Grand Historian nor Book of Han mentioned his fate after the battle.

The Wang clans of Langya and Taiyuan included the descendants of Wang Jian and Wang Li.

== Cultural references ==
In the manga and anime Kingdom, Wang Jian is known as "Ou Sen", the head of the Ou family. He is portrayed as a quiet, calm and gifted warfare tactician. Because of his accomplishments, he is appointed by King Ei Sei as one of the new "Qin Six Great Generals", tasked to achieve the unification of China.
