= Li Mu =

Chinese general (d. 229 BCE)

Lord Wu'an Li Mu
- 李牧
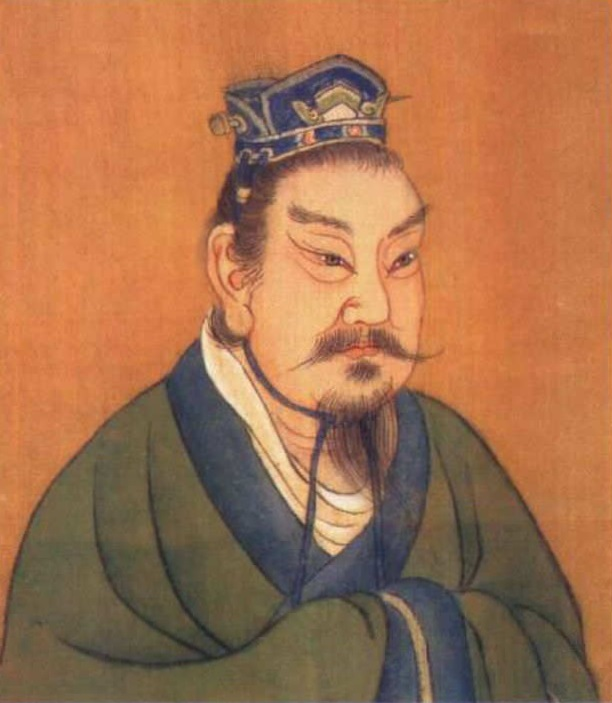
- A Qing dynasty portrait of Li Mu
- Died: 229 BC; Handan, Zhao (present-day Hebei, China)
- Relatives: Li Xin (first cousin once removed)
- Military career
- Allegiance: Zhao
- Rank: Grand General
- Conflicts: Zhao–Xiongnu War; Qin's conquest of Zhao

Li Mu
- Traditional Chinese: 李牧
- Simplified Chinese: 李牧
Transcriptions
Standard Mandarin
- Hanyu Pinyin: Lǐ Mù
- Wade–Giles: Li Mu

Li Mu (Chinese: 李牧; died 229 BC), personal name Zuo (繓), courtesy name Mu (牧), was a Chinese military general of the State of Zhao during the Warring States period. He was regarded by the Thousand Character Classic as one of the four Greatest Generals of the Warring States period, along with Bai Qi, Wang Jian and Lian Po. He is widely considered as one of the best defensive tacticians and commanders of ancient warfare.

== Life ==
According to the History of the Northern Dynasties, Li Mu was a descendant of Laozi. According to the New Book of Tang, Li Mu was a first cousin once removed of Qin general Li Xin.

In 265 BC, Li Mu was stationed in Yanmen Commandery and ordered to defend northwestern commanderies of Yanshan (雁山) and Daijun (代郡) from raids instigated by the Xiongnu (匈奴) and other tribes. He initially adopted an extremely defensive strategy, for which he was accused of cowardice and thereafter replaced by a more aggressive general.

The Zhao state prepared an army of 1,300 war chariots, 13,000 cavalry, 50,000 infantry and 100,000 archers. The army was scattered in the countryside. The Xiongnu sent a small force to raid the border, and Li Mu pretended to be defeated, and abandoned a few thousand men to the Xiongnu. The chanyu (or shan-yü, title for the chief of the Xiongnu) heard of this and then sent a large force to invade Zhao. The Zhao divided into two armies, encircled and beat the Xiongnu, killing hundreds of thousands of men and horses. Then the Zhao exterminated the Dan Lan, defeated the Dong Hu, forced the Lin Hu to surrender, making the shan-yü flee.

In 243 BC, Li Mu took over command in the war against Yan and managed to conquer Wusui (武遂) and Fangcheng (方城).

Later, as the threat from Qin increased with the previous ascension of King Zheng, Li Mu turned his focus more towards the western parts of Zhao. However, the State of Zhao was significantly weakened. After having previously suffered utter defeat at the hands of Qin forces led by Bai Qi during, and in the aftermath of, the Battle of Changping in 260 BC, in which Zhao had lost virtually its entire army, most of the core Zhao territories had fallen to Qin. Furthermore, Zhao was diplomatically isolated as the Kingdoms of Wei, Yan, and Han were too weak to offer any kind of support, while Qi and Chu were more willing to see the kingdom extinguished than face the powerful Qin.

Nevertheless, Li Mu could still hold out against and compete with the much stronger Qin forces. So while Qin could raid Wei and Han at will, they had a much harder time pillaging in Zhao.

In 233 BC, when Qin forces under general Huan Yi (桓齮) attacked the cities of Chili (赤麗) and Yi'an (宜安). Li Mu was appointed as commander in chief of the Zhao army, engaging and crushing the Qin army at Yi'an (宜安; around present-day Shijiazhuang, Hebei) or Feixia (肥; west of present-day Jinzhou, Hebei province, China), depending on the different sources. For this accomplishment he was rewarded with the title of Marquis of Wu'an (武安君).

During the year 232 BC, a Qin army invaded Zhao and captured the City of Langmeng, but were once again defeated by Li Mu at the Battle of Fanwu (番吾; in present-day Pingshan, Hebei). Li Mu (according to some interpretations) also held off a Han-Wei incursion in Southern Zhao, after this battle the Zhao forces withdrew into their capital area.

In 229 BC, Wang Jian invaded Zhao, but he (along with fellow generals Yang Duan He, Qiang Lei and Li Xin) could not make any progress against Li Mu, resulting in a stalemate. Eliminating Li Mu became a necessity for Qin to conquer Zhao and ultimately to unify China. The Qin decided to send spies to the Zhao court, bribing key courtiers such as Guo Kai (郭開) and Han Cang (韓倉) to persuade the King of Zhao to replace Li Mu and Sima Shang (司馬尚) with Zhao Cong (趙蔥) and Yan Ju (顏聚) as generals by alleging that the former were planning a rebellion. The plan succeeded. Li Mu was expelled from his position and soon thereafter either executed or forced to commit suicide on the king's orders.

With Li Mu's death, the fall of Zhao became inevitable, and the state was swiftly crushed afterwards by Qin forces. And in just a few years' time the state of Dai would also fall, therefore putting an end to the last remnants of Zhao.

== Legacy ==
Li Mu sometimes appears as a menshen on Chinese and Taoist temples, usually paired with Bai Qi. He is also commemorated at Zhenbian Hall, a temple beside the Tianxian Gate at Yanmen Pass in Shanxi. He is also a central character named Ri Boku in the manga Kingdom and its anime adaptation. He is the founding ancestor of the Li clan of Zhao Commandery.
