= Li Xin (Qin) =

3rd-century BC Chinese general

- 李信
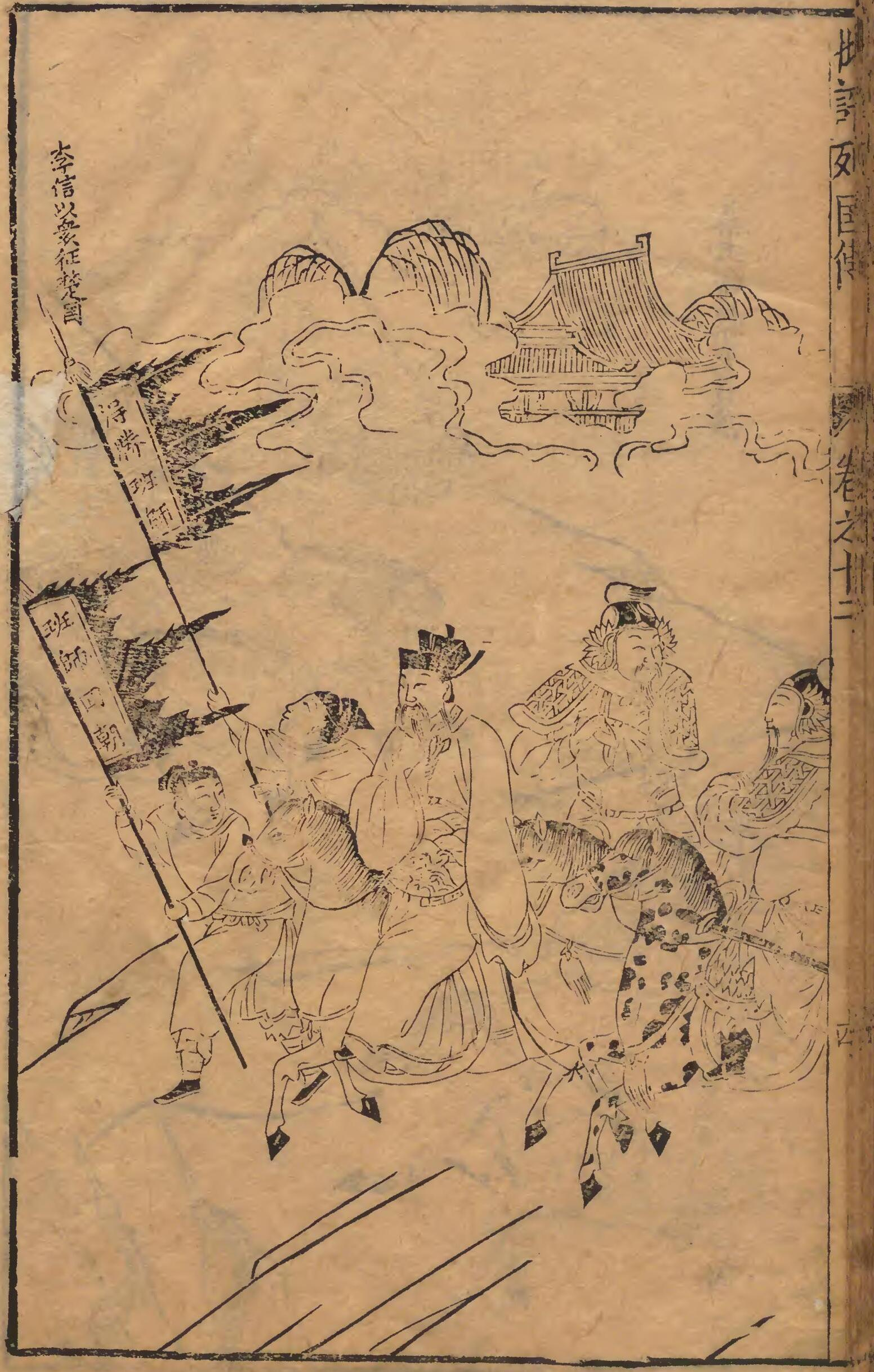
- Ming dynasty portrayal of Li Xin
- Relatives: Li Mu (first cousin once removed); Li Guang (5th-generation descendant)
- Military career
- Branch: Qin

Li Xin (李信), courtesy name Youcheng (有成), was an important Chinese military general of Qin during the Warring States era. Alongside Wang Jian, Wang Ben and other generals, Li Xin served under Qin Shi Huang (Ying Zheng) in his conquest of the six Warring States. He was also the 5th-generation ancestor of Li Guang, a Han dynasty general.

== Early life ==
According to the History of the Northern Dynasties, Li Xin was a descendant of Laozi. According to the New Book of Tang, Li Xin was a first cousin once removed of Zhao general Li Mu.

Li Xin was a son of the governor Li Yao or Li Pingyao of Nanjun Commandery, Li Xin started his military service during Qin Shi Huang's reign in the Qin campaigns of unification, becoming an important General of the Qin kingdom.

=== Zhao state ===
He was present during the conquest of Zhao, and General Wang Jian ordered Li Xin to capture Handan to finalize the fall of Zhao, which he did successfully.

=== Yan state ===
After the fall of Zhao in 228 BCE, Wang Jian's army stationed in Zhongshan started preparations for an offensive war against Yan. Ju Wu (鞠武), a Yan minister, proposed to Xi, King of Yan, to form alliances with the Dai, Qi, and Chu states, and make peace with the Xiongnu in the north, as a preemptive measure in preparation for the Qin invasion. However, Crown Prince Dan felt that the alliance strategy was unlikely to succeed, so he sent Jing Ke to assassinate Ying Zheng, the king of Qin. Jing Ke entered Qin disguised as an envoy, bringing with him a map of Dukang and the head of Fan Yuqi, a turncoat Qin general. The assassination attempt failed and Jing Ke was killed.

In 227 BCE, using the assassination attempt as casus belli, Ying Zheng ordered Wang Jian to lead an assault against Yan, with Meng Wu (蒙武) as Wang's deputy. The Qin defeated the Yan army as well as Yan's reinforcements from Dai in a battle on the eastern bank of the Yi River (易水), after which they captured the Yan capital, Ji (薊; present-day Beijing). Xi, King of Yan and his son, Crown Prince Dan, fled with their remaining forces to the Liaodong Peninsula. The Qin army under General Li Xin, with several thousand men under his command, pursued the retreating Yan to the Yan River (衍水; present-day Hun River, Liaoning), where they engaged with enemy forces and destroyed the bulk of Yan's army and captured Dan. Later, Xi ordered Crown Prince Dan's execution and sent his son's head to Qin as an "apology" for the assassination attempt. Qin accepted the offer and did not attack Yan for the next three years.

In 222 BCE, Wang Ben (王賁) & Li Xin led a Qin army to invade Liaodong, destroying Yan's remaining forces and ending the state of Yan. The former territories of Yan were partitioned and re-organized into the Qin dynasty's Yuyang (漁陽), Beiping (北平), Liaoxi (遼西) and Liaodong (遼東) commanderies.

For his remarkable services during the attacks on Yan, Li Xin's worth and bravery earned him the trust of King Ying Zheng.

=== Chu state ===
In 224 BCE, Qin began preparations for an invasion of Chu, one of its rivals among the six states. During a discussion between Ying Zheng and his subjects, the veteran general Wang Jian claimed that the invasion force needed to be at least 600,000 strong to succeed against Chu, but the younger general Li Xin believed that 200,000 men would be sufficient. Ying Zheng ordered Li Xin and Meng Tian to command the Qin army in the attack on Chu.

The initial invasion of Chu was marching on successful path for Qin, Li Xin attacked and captured the cities of Pingyu, Yan and Ying, the joined forces with Meng Tiang on Chengfu.

Then, the Chu led by General Xiang Yan, took Li Xin's army by surprise with a 500,000 men army and completely annihilated Li's force in the unfamiliar territory of Huaiyang, modern-day northern Jiangsu and Anhui provinces. And finally, depending on the interpretation of the sources, to close on a Chu pincer tactic, Li Xin's army was also ambushed by Lord Changping's army (former prime minister of the Qin state). During the battle, Xiang Yan's army burnt two large Qin camps and killed seven commandants. Some scholars believe either Xiang Yan or Lord Changping achieved victory by luring in the Qin army and by allowing them the few initial victories, only to have them pincered and annihilated later on. This incident was considered the greatest setback out of all of Qin's campaigns.

Henceforth, Ying Zheng replaced Li Xin and assigned Wang Jian the command of a 600,000-strong army with Li in the following year as he had requested and ordered him to lead another attack on Chu. High in morale after their victory in the previous year, the Chu forces were content to sit back and defend against what they expected to be a siege of Chu. In response, Wang Jian decided to lull the Chu garrisons into a false sense of security by appearing to idle in his fortifications while secretly training his troops to fight in Chu territory. After a year, a great portion of the Chu garrisons decided to disband and demobilize due to an apparent lack of action from the Qin. Wang Jian invaded at this point, having prepared for war the entire time, and overran Huaiyang and the diminished Chu forces. Chu was swept away by the momentum of the swift assault and could only sustain local guerrilla-style resistance until it was fully conquered with the capture of Shouchun and the death of its last leader, who was either Lord Changping or Fuchu depending on different accounts, in 223 BCE. Conflicting narratives of the battle in the Records of the Grand Historian state that Xiang Yan was either killed in action or committed suicide. Thus the state of Chu was brought to an end. In 222 BCE, the Qin army advanced southward and annexed the Wuyue region (covering present-day Zhejiang and Jiangsu provinces).

=== Qi state ===
In 264 BCE, Tian Jian ascended the throne of Qi and was assisted by his mother, the queen dowager, in managing state affairs. Qin bribed Hou Sheng, the Qi chancellor, to dissuade King Jian from helping the other states while they were being attacked by Qin. By 221 BCE, Qi was the only state in China that had yet to be conquered by Qin. Qi hurriedly mobilized its armies to its western borders as a safeguard against a possible Qin invasion.

In the same year, Ying Zheng used Qi's rejection of a meeting with a Qin envoy as an excuse to attack Qi. Along with Wang Ben, Li Xin, and the Qin Army, avoided direct confrontation with enemy forces stationed on Qi's western borders and advanced into Qi's heartland via a southern detour from Yan. The Qin forces met with little resistance as they passed through Qi territory and eventually arrived at Linzi (north of present-day Zibo, Shandong), the capital of Qi. King Jian was caught by surprise and, after being persuaded by Hou Sheng, he surrendered to Qin without putting up a fight. The former territories of Qi were reorganized to form the Qin Empire's Qi and Langya commanderies.

=== Dai state ===
Li Xin, alongside Generals Wang Ben and Meng Tian, was also present during the attack and destruction of the state of Dai (remnants of Zhao state), ending their opposition against Qin rule.

== Aftermath ==
Li Xin retired after Qin's unification, choosing to live in the area of modern Gansu. However, before doing so, he was bestowed the title of 'Marquis of Longxi' by Qin Shi Huang due to his military achievements during Qin's unification war.

== Descendants ==
He set an important military precedent of achievements for his line of descendants (whom included the famed General Li Guang of the Han Dynasty) and for the House of Li, which elevated itself to Imperial House during the rise of the mighty Tang Dynasty by the deeds of Li Yuan (Emperor Gaozu) and Li Shimin (Emperor Taizong), thus becoming a vital piece of Chinese history.

== In popular culture ==
Li Xin (Ri Shin) is the protagonist of anime/manga "Kingdom", one of the best-selling manga of all time. In Kingdom, he is depicted as a former servant/slave who seeks to accomplish his dream of becoming the "Greatest General under the Heavens" during the Chinese Warring States Period.

== Sources ==
Loewe, Michael (2000), A Biographical Dictionary of the Qin, Former Han and Xin Periods (221 BC-AD 24) (Handbook of Oriental Studies, 16), Brill Academic Pub, ISBN 9004103643
