= Wang Ben =

Chinese general during the Warring States period

Personal details
- Children: 1
- Parent: Wang Jian (father)

Wang Ben (王賁), was a Chinese general of the state of Qin during the Warring States period. He was a son of the better known general Wang Jian. He played a key role in the Qin's wars of unification.

In the 21st Year of Qin Shi Huang, 226 BC, Wang Ben attacked Chu, defeating the Chu army, taking 10 cities.

== Life ==
Wang Ben came up with the idea of directing the waters from the Yellow River and the Hong Canal to flood Daliang. Wang Ben's troops worked for three months to redirect the water flow while maintaining the siege on Daliang, and succeeded in their plan. Daliang was heavily flooded and over 100,000 people died, including civilians. King Jia of Wei surrendered and Wei came under Qin's control. Qin established the commanderies of Dang and Sishui in the former Wei territories.

In 222 BCE he led with Li Xin an army that invaded Liaodong and destroyed the remaining forces of Yan, capturing King Xin, and bringing an end to Yan. In the same year Wang Ben led a Qin army that conquered Dai, and captured King Jia of Dai (the last ruler of the state of Zhao).

== Popular culture ==
In Kingdom where he is known as "Ou Hon" son of Ou Sen, he is a master spearman and General of Qin, he has some arrogant attitude due to his high birth and his proficient skills. He also has a rivalry with Xin due to both of them being promising youngsters aiming to become Great Generals of the Heavens.

== Descendant ==
Wang Ben had a son named Wang Li (王離). Wang Li had two sons named Wang Yuan (王元) and Wang Wei (王威). Wang Yuan was the ancestor of Wang clan of Langya and Wang Wei was the ancestor of Wang clan of Taiyuan.
