= Emperor Yi =

Emperor Yi may refer to:

- Di Yi (Chinese: 帝乙; lit. 'Emperor Yi', fl. 12th–11th century BC), king of the Shang dynasty
- Emperor Yi of Chu (died 206 BC), ruler of the revived Chu state in the late Qin dynasty
- Zhengde Emperor (1491–1521), emperor of the Ming dynasty, also known by his shortened posthumous name as Emperor Yi of Ming (明毅帝)
- Giocangga (1526–1583), Jurchen leader who received the posthumous title Emperor Yi (翼皇帝) during the Qing dynasty
- Dorgon (1612–1650), Qing dynasty regent who received the posthumous title Emperor Yi (義皇帝)
- Tongzhi Emperor (1856–1875), emperor of the Qing dynasty, also known by his shortened posthumous name as Emperor Yi of Qing (清毅帝)
- Emperors of the Korean Empire, from the House of Yi
  - Gojong of Korea (1852–1919)
  - Sunjong of Korea (1874–1926)

== See also ==
- Emperor Yizong (disambiguation)
- King Yi (disambiguation)
