= King Hui of Yan =

Chinese king of Yan state from 278 to 272 BC

King Hui of Yan 燕惠王

King of Yan
- Reign: 278–272 BCE
- Predecessor: King Zhao
- Successor: King Wucheng
- Born: ?
- Died: 272 BC
Names
- Ancestral name: Jī (姬); Clan name: Yān (燕); Given name: Unknown
Posthumous name
- King Hui (惠王)
- House: Ji
- Dynasty: Yan
- Father: King Zhao of Yan

King Hui of Yan (Chinese: 燕惠王; died 272 BC), personal name unknown, was a king of the Yan state. He ruled the kingdom between 278 BC until his death in 272 BC.

King Hui was a son of King Zhao, who appointed King Hui heir apparent to the throne. He had been at odds with the general Yue Yi. After his succession, he replaced Yue Yi with Qi Jie (騎劫) as the top commander of the army. Yue Yi escaped to the Zhao state, where he was enfeoffed as Lord of Wangzhu. Yet Qi Jie was not a good leader; Yan was defeated by the troops of the Qi state under Tian Dan and lost all the territory that it had captured from Qi again. King Hui sent a letter to Yue Yi, accusing him of betraying the country. Yue Yi replied: "I have heard that the worthy and sage-like among the lords would never lay waste to the achievements they had established and thus were written about in the annals of their country, and that prescient scholars would never ruin the reputation they had perfected and thus were extolled by later generations." King Hui was regretful; as a compensation, he ordered Yue Jian (樂間), who was Yue Yi's son, to inherit the title "Lord of Changguo".

In 272 BC, King Hui was murdered by his chancellor Gongsun Cao (公孫操). He was succeeded by King Wucheng.
