= Sino-Korean War =

Sino-Korean War is used to refer to:

- Sino-Korean War (610–614), otherwise known as the Goguryeo–Sui War
- Sino-Korean War (645–647), otherwise known as the First Goguryeo–Tang War
- Sino-Korean War (660–668), otherwise known as the Second Goguryeo–Tang War

The term may also refer to any of the other military conflicts between historical Chinese and Korean states:

- Gojoseon–Yan War (late 4th century BC)
- Gojoseon–Han War (109–108 BC)
- Goguryeo–Wei War (224–245)
- Baekje-Tang War (660-663)
- Silla–Tang War (670–676)
- Goryeo–Khitan War (993–1019)
- Later Jin invasion of Joseon (1627)
- Qing invasion of Joseon (1636–1637)
- Korean invasion of Manchuria
- China in the Korean War (1950–1953)
