= King Wucheng of Yan =

Chinese king of Yan state from 271 to 258 BC

King Wucheng of Yan 燕武成王

King of Yan
- Reign: 271–258 BC
- Predecessor: King Hui
- Successor: King Xiao
- Born: ?
- Died: 258 BC
- Spouse: A daughter of King Huiwen of Zhao
- Issue: King Xiao of Yan
Names
- Ancestral name: Jī (姬); Clan name: Yān (燕); Given name: Unknown
Posthumous name
- King Wucheng (武成王)
- House: Ji
- Dynasty: Yan

King Wucheng of Yan (Chinese: 燕武成王; died 258 BC), personal name unknown, was a king of the Yan state. He ruled the kingdom between 271 BC until his death in 258 BC.

In 272 BC, King Wucheng's father, King Hui, was murdered by the powerful chancellor Gongsun Cao (公孫操). King Wucheng was crowned as the new Yan king. In the same year, Yan was attacked by a joint expedition of the forces of Han, Wei and Chu states. In 265 BC, Yan lost a battle against the troops of the Qi state led by Tian Dan. King Wucheng died in 258 BC, and was succeeded by his son, King Xiao.
