= King Xiao of Yan =

Chinese king of Yan state from 257 to 255 BC

King Xiao of Yan 燕孝王

King of Yan
- Reign: 257–255 BCE
- Predecessor: King Wucheng
- Successor: Ji Xi
- Died: 255 BC
- Issue: Ji Xi
Names
- Ancestral name: Jī (姬); Clan name: Yān (燕); Given name: Unknown
Posthumous name
- King Xiao (孝王)
- House: Ji
- Dynasty: Yan
- Father: King Wucheng of Yan

King Xiao of Yan (Chinese: 燕孝王; died 255 BC), whose personal name is unknown, was the king of the Yan state from 257 BC until his death in 255 BC.

King Xiao was a son of King Wucheng, and ascended the throne after his father's death. During his reign, Yan started constructing an extensive fortification to protect against the barbarians. The wall stretched from Shanggu Commandery to Liaodong Commandery.

King Xiao died in 255 BC, and was succeeded by his son Ji Xi.

== See also ==
- Gojoseon–Yan War
