= Xiadu =

Coordinates: 39.616908°N 116.056000°E

The Xiadu or Lower Capital of Yan (Chinese: 下都; pinyin: Xiàdū) was one of the capitals of Yan during the Warring States period of ancient China. Xiadu may have been the largest city in the world from 400 to 300 BC, with an estimated peak population over 300,000.

The remains of the city are located in Yi County, Baoding, Hebei Province. At 30 km^{2}, Xiadu is the largest excavated city from the Warring States period. Xiadu was surrounded by a moat and rammed earth wall; the base of the city walls measured 40 m at its widest. A portion of the old city wall, measuring up to 6.8 m high, still remains today. The ruins were first excavated in 1929 by an archaeological expedition from Peking University.

The city was built in the Taihang Mountains, flanked by the Beiyi River to its north and by the Zhongyi River to its south. The difficult topography made it easy to defend from attack. The city was square, with a wall and canal running north–south through its center, dividing the city into eastern and western halves. Large workshops for casting iron, casting bronze, minting coins, making weapons, making pottery and making bone objects were all found in the eastern city. The palace and royal cemeteries were also located in the eastern city. Two cemeteries were discovered; 13 and 10 tombs were found in each. All the tombs were covered by a pyramidal tumulus. A museum about the discovered objects was built in Beijing.
