= Kuai, King of Yan =

Chinese king of Yan state from 320 to 318 BC

Kuai of Yan 燕王噲

King of Yan
- Reign: 320–318 BCE
- Predecessor: King Yi
- Successor: Zi Zhi (子之) (usurper)
- Born: ?
- Died: 314 BC
- Issue: Crown Prince Ping (太子平); King Zhao of Yan
Names
- ancestral name Jī (姬) clan name Yān (燕); Given name Kuài (噲 or 徻)
- House: Ji
- Dynasty: Yan
- Father: King Yi of Yan

Kuai, King of Yan (Chinese: 燕王噲; pinyin: Yān Wáng Kuài) was a king of the Yan state. He ruled the state between 320 BC and 318 BC.

Kuai was the son of King Yi, whom he succeeded to the throne. In 318 BC, Lu Maoshou (鹿毛壽) persuaded him to resign the throne in favor of the powerful chancellor Zizhi (子之) to "prove his humility". Kuai did so and even removed his crown prince from power. In 314 BC, Crown Prince Ping (太子平) revolted against Zizhi, but was failed and killed in action. Encouraged by Mencius and other ministers, King Xuan of Qi sent Kuang Zhang (匡章) to attack Yan in 314 BC. Yan was practically conquered by Qi, and both Kuai and Zizhi were killed.
