= China in the Korean War =

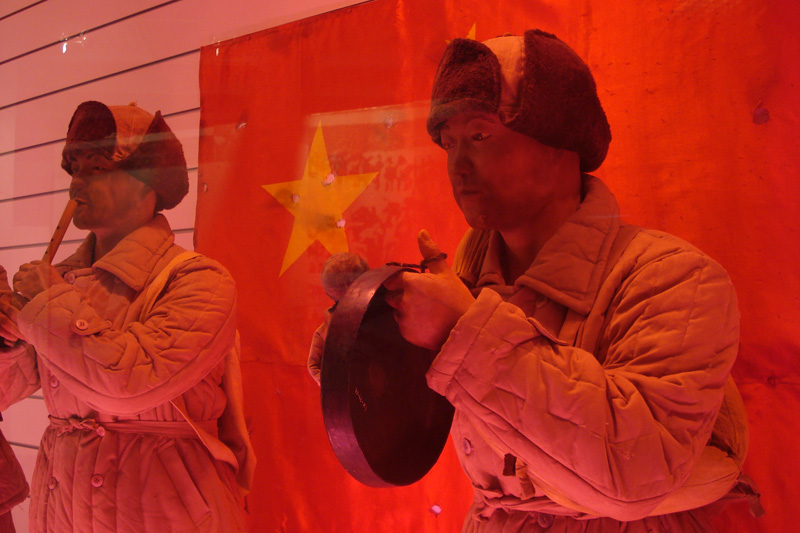
Uniform of PVA soldiers, who used flutes and gongs to communicate in battle.

The People's Republic of China played an important role in the Korean War. Prior to North Korea's invasion of South Korea in June 1950, China sent many Chinese ethnic Koreans who had served with the Chinese People's Liberation Army (PLA) to serve in North Korea's Korean People's Army (KPA), with them making up 47% of the North's invasion force. China directly entered the conflict in October 1950, with the People's Volunteer Army (PVA) units crossing the Yalu River in secret, in support of North Korea. Subsequently, Chinese forces launched multiple major campaigns against United Nations Command and South Korean troops, playing a crucial role in prolonging and shaping the war's outcome. Throughout the conflict, the PVA engaged in extensive combat operations, logistics build-up, and defensive strategies, eventually deploying over one million personnel at the height of its involvement. The Chinese intervention influenced both battlefield dynamics and the broader geopolitical landscape, contributing to the eventual stalemate and the signing of the Korean Armistice Agreement in 1953. The PVA's participation resulted in significant casualties and economic costs for China, and also solidified its status as a regional power in the early Cold War period.

== Background ==
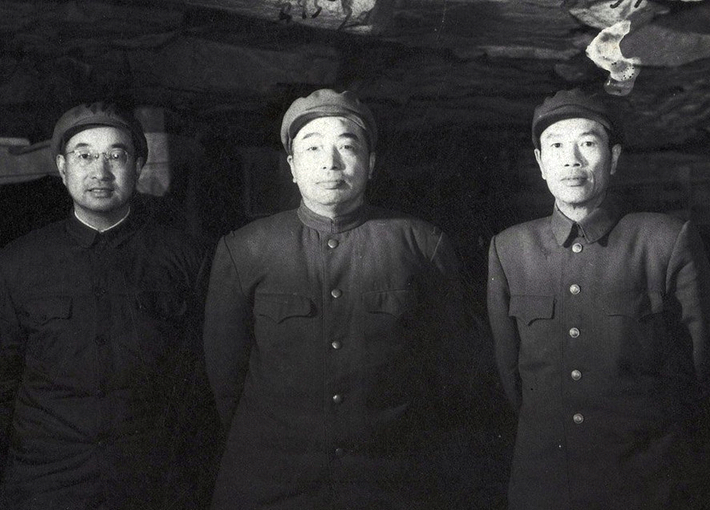
Three commanders of the PVA during the Korean War. From left to right: Chen Geng (1952); Peng Dehuai (1950–1952); and Deng Hua (1952–1953).

North Korea had good relations with China from the period of the recently concluded Chinese Civil War. In the late 1940s, after World War II ended and the Chinese Civil War resumed, while the Chinese Communist Party was struggling for supremacy in Manchuria, they were supported by the North Korean government with matériel and manpower. According to Chinese sources, the North Koreans donated 2,000 railway cars worth of supplies while thousands of Koreans served in the Chinese PLA during the war. North Korea also provided the Chinese Communists in Manchuria with a safe refuge for non-combatants and communications with the rest of China. As a token of gratitude, between 50,000 and 70,000 Chinese ethnic Korean veterans who served in the PLA were sent back along with their weapons, and they later played a significant role in the initial invasion of South Korea. These former Chinese soldiers turned North Korean soldiers made up 47% of North Korea's 148,680-man army by June 1950. While some older histories of the war referred to these ethnic Korean PLA veterans as being originally from northern Korea who went to fight in the Chinese Civil War before being sent back, recent Chinese archives indicate that these soldiers were actually part of China's longstanding ethnic Korean community. This includes several high ranking North Korean generals who played an important role in the invasion including Lee Kwon-mu. China also promised to support the North Koreans in the event of a war against South Korea.

North Korean leader Kim Il Sung met with Chairman of the Chinese Communist Party Mao Zedong in May 1950 and differing historical interpretations of the meeting have been put forward. According to Barbara Barnouin and Yu Changgeng, Mao agreed to support Kim despite concerns of American intervention, as China desperately needed the economic and military aid promised by the Soviets. Kathryn Weathersby cites Soviet documents which said Kim secured Mao's support. Along with Mark O'Neill, she says this accelerated Kim's war preparations. Chen Jian said Mao never seriously challenged Kim's plans and Kim had every reason to inform Stalin that he had obtained Mao's support. Citing more recent scholarship, Zhao Suisheng said Mao did not approve of Kim's war proposal and requested verification from Stalin, who did so via a telegram. Mao accepted the decision made by Kim and Stalin to unify Korea but cautioned Kim over possible US intervention.

The combat veterans and equipment from China, the tanks, artillery, and aircraft supplied by the Soviets, and rigorous training increased North Korea's military superiority over the South, armed by the U.S. military with mostly small arms, but no heavy weaponry. Several generals, such as Lee Kwon-mu, were PLA veterans born to ethnic Koreans in China. While older histories of the conflict often referred to these ethnic Korean PLA veterans as being sent from northern Korea to fight in the Chinese Civil War before being sent back, recent Chinese archival sources studied by Kim Donggill indicate that this was not the case. Rather, the soldiers were indigenous to China, as part of China's longstanding ethnic Korean community, and were recruited to the PLA in the same way as any other Chinese citizen.

Although the Chinese leadership did not make the decision to enter the Korean War until United Nations (UN) forces crossed the 38th Parallel in October 1950, it had been preparing for the possibility ever since United States intervened in Korea in June 1950. (The Korean War begun on 25 June 1950) Two weeks later, on 7 July, Chinese Premier Zhou Enlai and Mao chaired a conference discussing military preparations for Chinese involvement the conflict. Another conference took place on 10 July. Here, it was decided that the 13th Army Corps under the 4th Field Army of the People's Liberation Army (PLA), one of the best-trained and best-equipped units in China, would be immediately transformed into the Northeastern Border Defense Army (NEBDA; also translated as the North East Frontier Force, NEFF) to prepare for "an intervention in the Korean War if necessary". On 13 July, Mao issued the order to establish the NEBDA in Manchuria, appointing Deng Hua, the commander of the 15th Army Corps and one of the most talented commanders of the Chinese Civil War, to coordinate all preparation efforts. Aside from the 38th, 39th and 40th Infantry Corps originally belonged to the 13th Army, the NEFF also included the 42nd Infantry Corps, three artillery divisions, one anti-aircraft regiments and three transport regiments—in total more than 250,000 men.

Mao convened the full Politburo of the Chinese Communist Party to debate his decision to enter the war.

== China enters the war ==
After the People's Republic of China entered the Korean War in October 1950 by designating the People's Liberation Army (PLA) North East Frontier Force as the People's Volunteer Army (PVA), the PVA spent the next two years and nine months in combat operations and five years and three months in garrison duties. Its last elements did not leave Korea until as late as 1958.

Although the United Nations Command (UNC) forces were under United States command, this army was officially a UN "police" force. In order to avoid an open war with the U.S. and other United Nations (UN) members, the People's Republic of China explicitly deployed the People's Liberation Army (PLA) under the name "volunteer army". No declaration of war ever existed between China and the UN (or the USA's) forces.

=== First Phase Campaign (October 25 – November 5, 1950) ===
On October 19, 1950, and under strict secrecy, the NEFF officially crossed the Yalu River under the name Chinese People's Volunteer Army (PVA), although advance scouting parties had been spotted by UN forces as early as October 13. On October 23, the PLA 50th and 66th Corps were attached to the PVA 13th Army in order to reinforce the defenses at Sinuiju and Chongju area. At the same time, the 13th Army Headquarters was disbanded to increase coordination between PVA Headquarters and its field units.

=== Second Phase Campaign (November 25 – December 24, 1950) ===
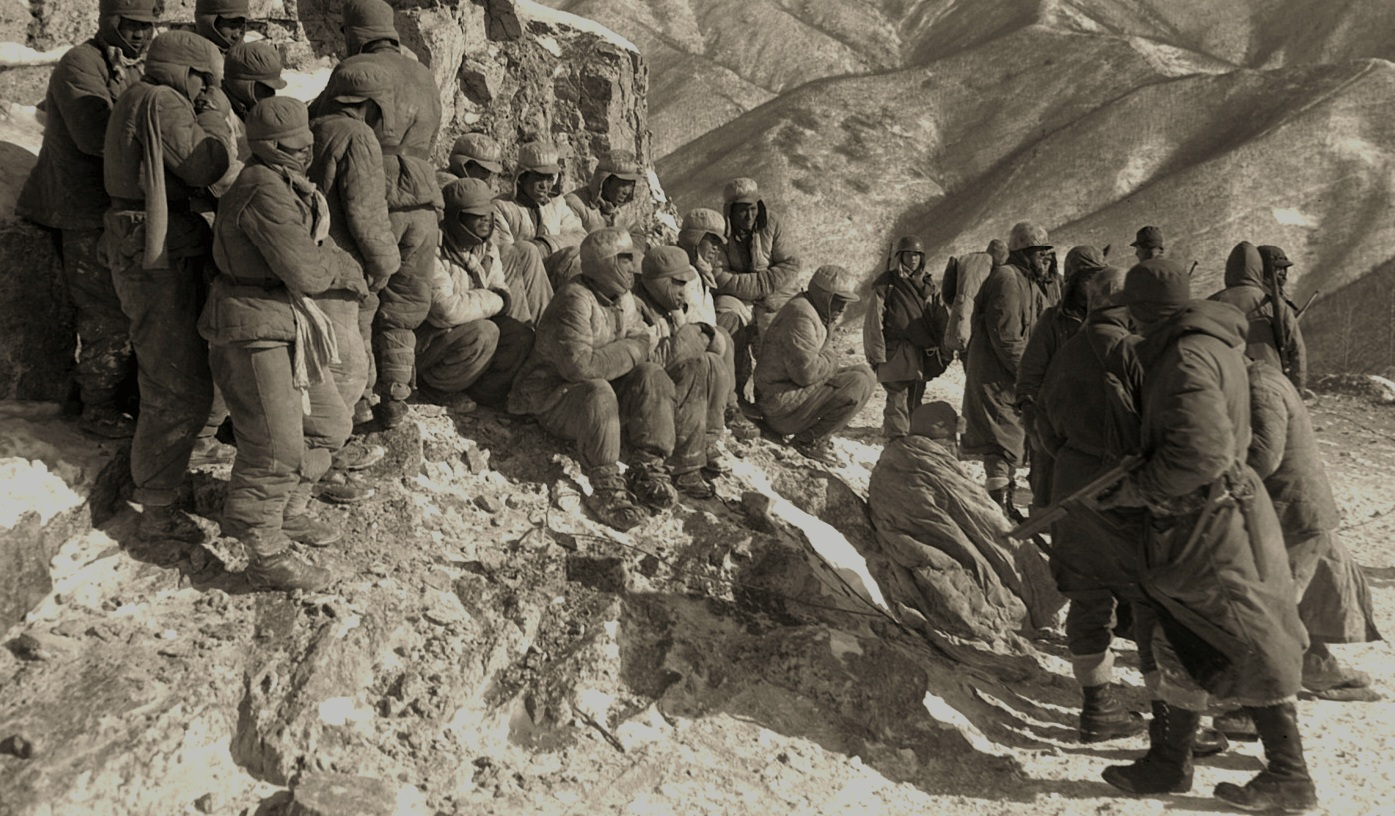
Chinese POWs captured by US Marines, December 1950

On August 26, 1950, the Chinese Central Military Commission concluded that PVA will eventually be composed of the PLA 9th, 13th and 19th Army—totaling 700,000 men—by the spring of 1951. On October 11, 1950, Mao authorized the PLA 9th Army to be moved from Shandong province to Manchuria as reserves to the 13th Army in Korea. On November 10, 1950, the PLA 9th Army entered Korea in order to reinforce Chinese forces on the east side of Taebaek Mountains. This development brought the total PVA strength to 450,000, including 380,000 combat personnel.

=== Third Phase Campaign (December 31, 1950 – January 8, 1951) ===
Although the PVA succeeded in expelling UN forces from North Korea during the Second Phase Campaign, about a quarter of its original 450,000 men became casualties in the aftermath of the campaign. On December 17, Mao ordered the PVA 9th Army to be removed from the front for rest and refit, reducing the PVA combat personnel to 230,000 by the end of December 1950. UN intelligence, on the other hand, estimated that only 171,117 combat personal were actually available for the PVA on January 1, 1951. By the end of 1950, however, the North Korean People's Army returned to the front and brought about 75,000 men to make up for the Chinese losses.

=== Fourth Phase Campaign (January 30 – April 21, 1951) ===
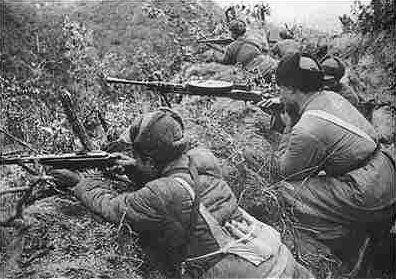
Chinese infantrymen in the Battle of Triangle Hill

By the end of the Third Phase Campaign, the PVA had become completely exhausted after fighting nonstop since the start of the Chinese intervention, and its combat personnel was further reduced to 217,000. According to PVA Deputy Commander Han Xianchu's evaluation of PVA, "many regiments and battalions are completely combat ineffective, with some divisions only half strength". On February 7, 1951, Mao decided that PLA 3rd, 19th, 20th Army and 47th Corps—from Sichuan, Gansu, Hebei and Hunan provinces respectively—would enter Korea to replace the PVA 13th Army currently on the front. But despite the massive mobilization effort, only the 26th Corps from the recovering PVA 9th Army actually arrived at the front during March 1951.

=== Fifth Phase Campaign (April 22 – June 10, 1951) ===
In the aftermath of the Fourth Phase Campaign, the PVA 13th Army's 38th and 42nd Corps were forced to leave the frontline for rest and refit, while its 50th and 66th Corps were evacuated back to China. Following Mao's orders, however, the PLA 3rd and 19th Army began to enter Korea in February 1951, alongside four field artillery divisions, two long range artillery divisions, four anti-aircraft divisions, one multiple rocket launcher division and four tank regiments. The PVA 9th Army had also returned to the front in April 1951 after four months of rest. Those development soon brought the total PVA strength to over one million men, including 548,000 combat personnel and 180,000 logistics personnel. On April 21, 1951, the 39th and 40th Corps of the PVA 13th Army were placed under 9th Army's control. On April 22, 1951, the reorganized PVA launched a full-scale offensive in Korea, and the resulting clashes between Chinese and UN forces is often described as the largest battle of the entire Korean War.

=== UN limited offensives (June 11 – December 3, 1951) ===
The Fifth Phase Campaign ended as a complete operational disaster for the PVA. About 12 divisions from the PVA 3rd and 19th Army were rendered combat ineffective, and between 85,000 and 110,000 men became casualties in the aftermath. With the frontline on the verge of collapse in the face of UN attacks, the 42nd and 47th Corps were sent as reinforcements on May 27, 1951. But the UN forces soon broke off their pursuit on June 1, and armistice negotiations started on July 10, 1951.

The presence of UN forces at the north of the 38th Parallel, however, prompted the PVA to plan a limited offensive dubbed the "Six Phase Campaign". Although the offensive was cancelled on September 4, 1951, it allowed the PLA 20th Army to be deployed in the Kumsong area by early September. The PVA had also decided to assume defensive posture on September 4 while postponing all major offensive operations, and the West Coast and East Coast Commands were created to guard against UN amphibious landings as the result. Finally, the Chinese Central Military Commission authorized the PLA Air Force to join the war in September 1951 as a response to Operation Strangle II conducted by the US Far East Air Force. By the end of October 1951, the total PVA strength in Korea reached 1.15 million men, including 19 infantry corps, nine artillery divisions, five tank regiments, 12 air force divisions, four railway engineering divisions and eight logistical corps.

=== Collapse of armistice negotiation (September 18 – November 25, 1952) ===
With the end Operation Commando on October 23, 1951, signaling the end of UN limited offensives, the Korean front had settled into a period of stalemate. Although the Chinese had lost 36,000 ground troops from the UN offensives, the losses were mostly replaced by the summer of 1952. The PVA Air Force, on the other hand, suffered major setbacks in constructing airfields in Korea. By late December 1951, all PVA Air Force personnel were stationed back to China due to the lack of airfields, and its ground support missions were soon abandoned.

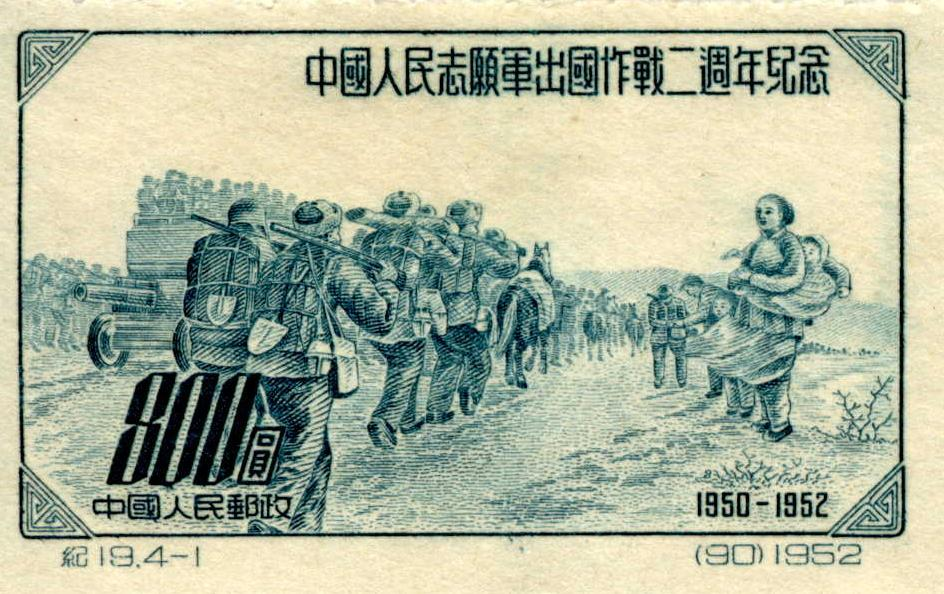
Chinese troops in Korea depicted on a 1952 Chinese postage stamp

With the front stabilized and no major offensives in planning, the PVA focused its attentions on logistics build up, troop rotations and political controls. In the area of logistics, the Railway Transport Forward Command was established in August 1951, and its Anti-Aircraft Artillery Command Bureau was organized in December 1951. This allowed four additional anti-aircraft artillery regiments to be deployed in Korea. The PVA headquarters had also planned to rotate all troops in Korea by the end of 1953, and the Chinese Central Military Commission authorized the PLA 23rd, 24th and 46th Corps to replace 20th, 27th and 42nd Corps by September 1952. Finally, the political mobilization programs strengthened the Communist Party's hold on the field units, and mass purges were carried out against undesirables while award systems were established for role models.

The armistice negotiations at Panmunjom began to fall apart in September 1952, primarily due to Sino-Korean insistence that all prisoners of war be repatriated to their respective original countries, regardless of their personal preferences. As a significant number of Chinese and North Korean POWs had expressed their desire to defect permanently to South Korea or Taiwan, the demand was met with strong opposition from the United States and South Korea. Feeling that the negotiations would soon fail, military commanders on both sides approved numerous tactical plans as means of applying pressure on their opponents. In late September, the PVA authorized its frontline troops to conduct tactical strikes against more than 20 UN outposts. The armistice negotiations officially ceased on October 8, 1952.

=== Signing of armistice agreement (May 13 – July 27, 1953) ===
The fighting that followed the collapse of the armistice negotiation were some of the worst of 1952. The Battle of White Horse had crippled four regiments from the PVA 38th Corps, while Operation Showdown resulted in 11,500 Chinese casualties. Despite the heavy losses, the Chinese managed to exhaust the UN forces through two months of attrition warfare, and the United Nations Command soon renounced all major ground operations for the rest of the war. The front was stabilized once again by November 1952.

Despite the success on the ground, the PVA Air Force was unable to challenge the air supremacy of the US Air Force. By May 1953, the US Air Force was able to launch 22,639 sorties per month against North Korean targets, while the PVA Air Force could only respond with 1,164 sorties during the same time period. The situation was further worsened when the Soviet Union withdrew 40 percent of its aircraft in the spring of 1953. The North Korean Premier Kim Il Sung began to sue for peace under the constant UN bombardment, and the PVA could only counter by encouraging the North Koreans to continue night bombing missions with Po-2 biplanes.

Dwight D. Eisenhower was elected as the President of the United States on November 4, 1952. After being elected, Eisenhower promised to end the Korean War with "deeds", not "words", while amphibious exercises were carried out around Korea. Although Eisenhower had no plans to end the war through military victory, the Chinese leadership interpreted those signs as an impending amphibious attack. As the result, the PLA 1st, 16th, 21st, 54th Infantry Corps, 33rd Infantry Division and 1st Tank Division were ordered into Korea on December 17, 1952. Those new reinforcements soon brought the total PVA strength to 1.35 million men by the summer of 1953.

To the surprise of Chinese leadership, the expected UN attack did not occur, and the armistice negotiations were later resumed on April 26, 1953. In order to end the war on favorable terms to the Communists, the reinforced PVA struck 10 UN outposts in early May 1953, while two major offensives were carried out against South Korean forces on June 10 and July 13 respectively. The resulting clashes soon produced 124,912 Chinese casualties against 60,360 UN losses from May to July. The armistice was signed at 10:12 on July 27, 1953, and the PVA ended the war with a total of 1.35 million men, including 19 infantry corps, 15 artillery divisions, 9 air force divisions, 10 railway engineer divisions and one Public Security division. The last Chinese formations left Korea on October 26, 1958.

== Order of battle ==
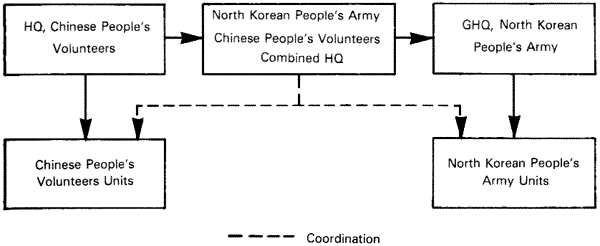
Relationship between the Chinese People's Volunteer Army and the Korean People's Army

For many years, historians found it difficult to provide an accurate order of battle for Chinese troops in Korea because most of the information could only be obtained from prisoner interrogations or captured documents. The constant Chinese troop movements and the reattachment of units between different commands further added to the confusion. By the 1980s, however, a large number of primary documents, memoirs and scholarly works on Chinese involvement in the Korean War began to appear in China, enabling historians to make a more comprehensive and accurate assessment of Chinese military operations during the war.

== Aftermath ==
China paid a huge price for its involvement in the Korean War. According to Chinese archives, about 73 percent of Chinese infantry forces, 67 percent of Chinese artillery forces, 100 percent of Chinese armored forces and 52 percent of Chinese air forces were deployed in Korea at one point or another, alongside 600,000 civilian laborers – in total more than three million civilian and military personnel. Out of those forces, around 152,000 were killed, 383,500 were wounded, 450,000 were hospitalized, 21,300 were captured and 4,000 were missing. Of the captured 14,190 defected to Taiwan after the ceasefire. China had also consumed 5.6 million tons of war material, 399 aircraft and 12,916 vehicles for its war efforts. About a third of the Chinese government's annual budget was spent on the military between 1950 and 1953, totaling 10 billion RMB by the war's end. (Note: Equivalent to 3.3 billion USD. See Li 2007, p. 112.) All in all, the Korean War was the largest foreign war in Chinese military history, despite the fact that no declaration of war ever existed between China and United Nations forces.

== See also ==
- Korean War order of battle: Chinese
- Sino-Korean War
- Soviet Union in the Korean War
