= King Yi =

King Yi may refer to:

- King Yih of Zhou (周懿王; fl. 9th century BC), seventh sovereign of the Chinese Zhou dynasty
- King Yi of Zhou (Xie) (周夷王; fl. 9th century BC), ninth sovereign of the Chinese Zhou dynasty
- King Yi of Yan (died 312 BC)
