= Gojoseon–Yan War =

4th-century BC war in Liaodong, China

Date	Late 4th century BC
Location	Liaodong Peninsula
Result	Yan victory
Territorial changes	Yan conquers the Liaodong Peninsula

Belligerents
Yan	Gojoseon

Commanders and leaders
King Zhao of Yan; Qin Kai	Unknown

During the Gojoseon–Yan War, which occurred in the late 4th century BC, the Yan state invaded the Gojoseon kingdom. The Yan military campaign was led by General Qin Kai. The invasion resulted in Yan's conquest of the Liaodong Peninsula from Gojoseon.

Around 323 BC, Yan attempted to invade Gojoseon to strengthen the authority of its king and to obtain human and material resources. However, Gojoseon was able to frustrate these plans through military and diplomatic actions. Yan was weakened by civil war since 316 BC, which had affected the balance of power between Gojoseon and Yan. Gojoseon applied political and military pressure on Yan during the period. This escalated the tension between the two states, which would ultimately lead into the outbreak of the war.

== See also ==
- Gojoseon–Han War
- Goguryeo–Yan Wars
