= Soviet Union in the Korean War =

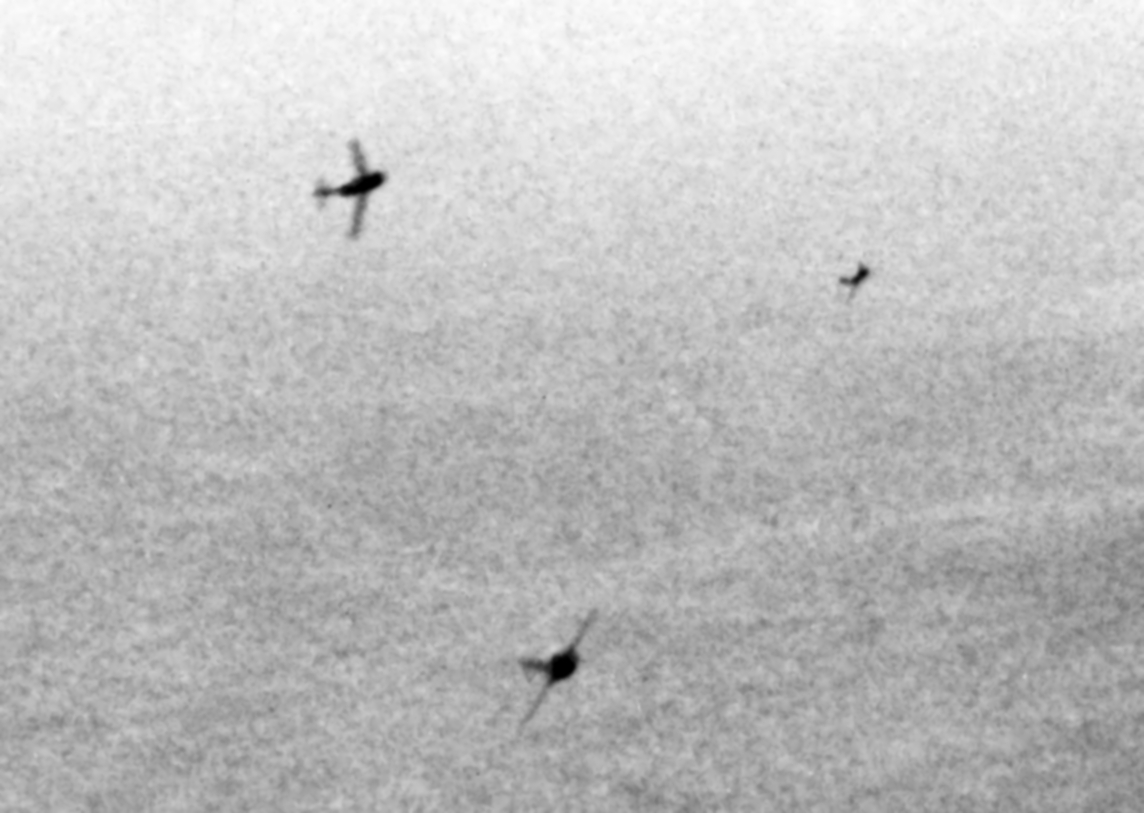
Soviet MiG-15s curving in to attack USAF B-29s, Korea 1951.

Though not officially a belligerent during the Korean War (1950–1953), the Soviet Union played a significant, covert role in the conflict. It provided material and medical services, as well as Soviet pilots and aircraft, most notably MiG-15 fighter jets, to aid the North Korean-Chinese army against the South Korean-United Nations Forces.

== Background ==
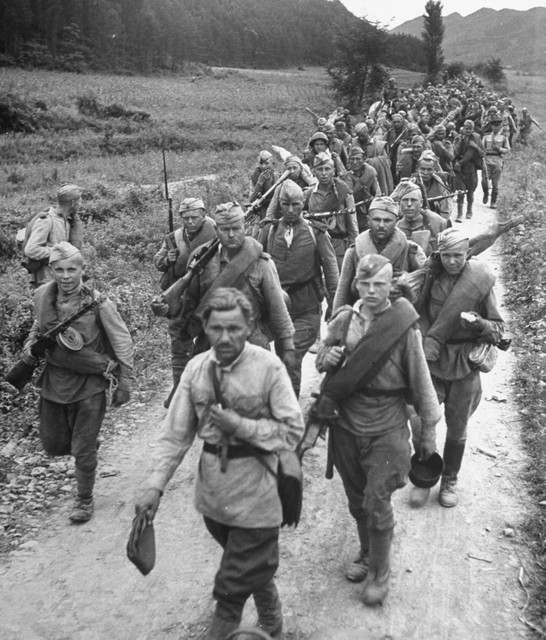
Soviet soldiers in Korea after the Manchuria Offensive, October 1945.

=== Soviet Occupation of Northern Korea (1945–1948) ===
The Soviet 25th Army took part in the Soviet advance into northern Korea immediately after World War II had ended, and was headquartered at Pyongyang for a period. Like the American forces in the south, Soviet troops remained in Korea after the end of the war to rebuild the country.

Soviet soldiers were instrumental in the creation and early development of the North Korean People's Army and Korean People's Air Force, as well as for stabilizing the early years of the Northern regime. The Shineuiju Air Force Academy was founded under Soviet leadership on 25 October 1945 in order to train new pilots. The soviets under Stalin's leadership also established Soviet Civil Administration that secured the ground for the long lasting Kim Il Sung dictatorship.

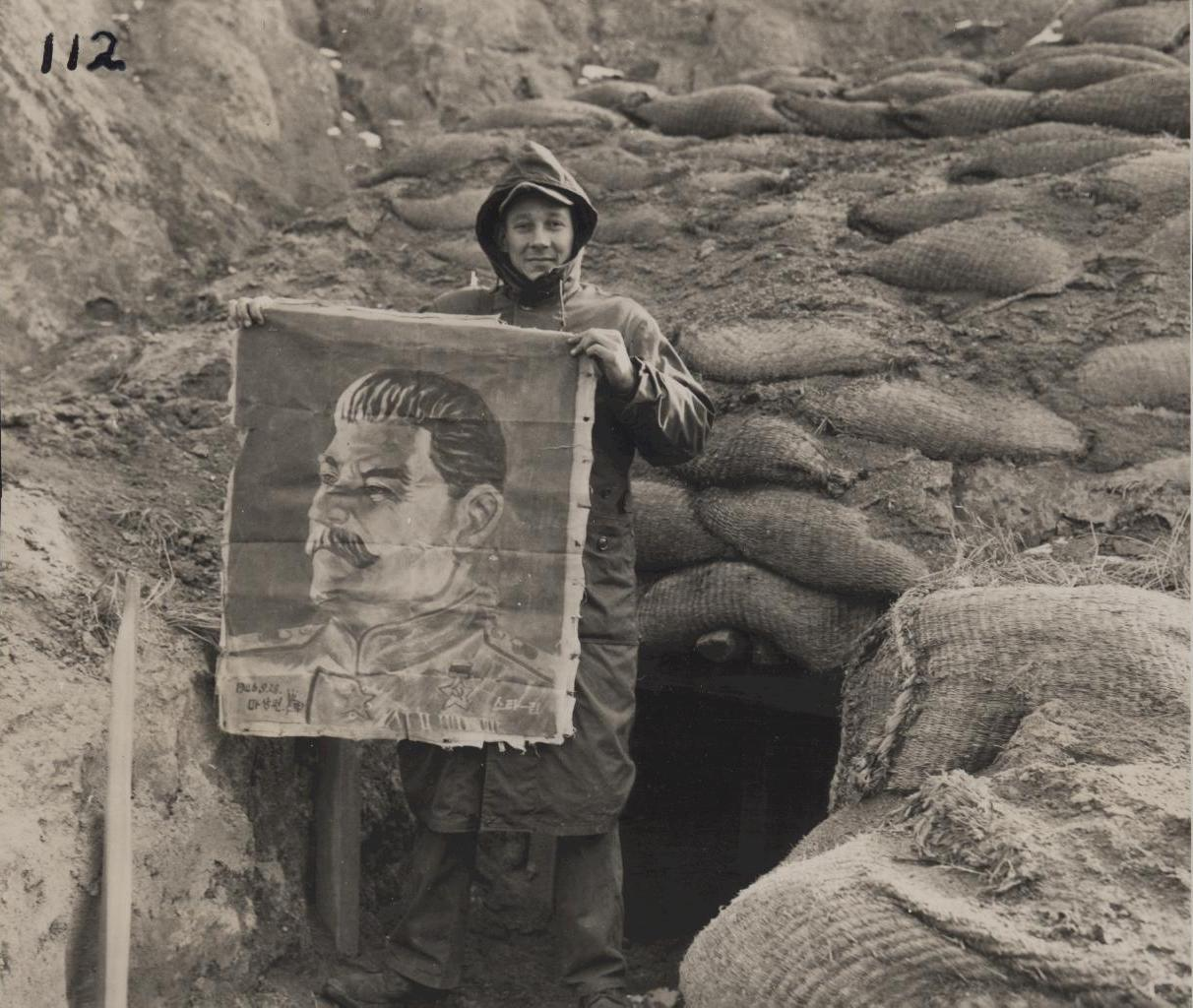
U.S. Marine with image of Stalin found in a bunker near Yudam-ni during Battle of the Chosin Reservoir, 27 November 1950

=== Cold War ===
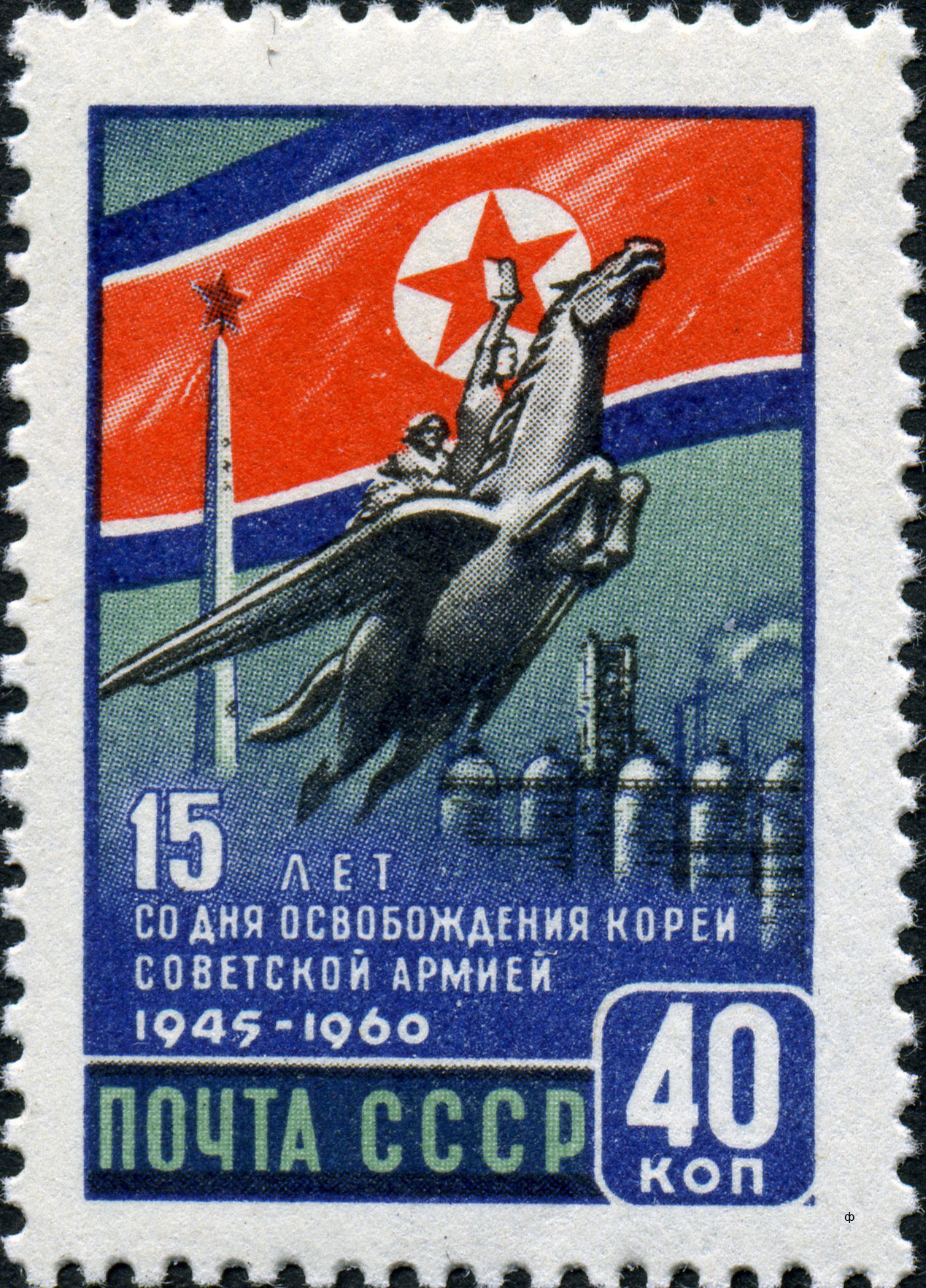
A Soviet Stamp of 1960 commemorates 15 years since the Soviet liberation of Korea from Japanese rule during the Second World War.

When the war broke out in 1950, the communist Soviet Union, China, and their allies were already locked into a "Cold War" with capitalist countries. Both sides felt that the Korean War carried the potential to further destabilize the precarious relations between both sides, while also offering possible advantages.

In April 1950, Stalin gave Kim permission to invade the South under the condition that Mao would agree to send reinforcements if needed. Stalin made it clear that Soviet forces would not openly engage in combat, to avoid a direct war with the US. Kim met with Mao in May 1950. Mao was concerned the US would intervene but agreed to support the North Korean invasion. China desperately needed the economic and military aid promised by the Soviets. However, Mao sent more ethnic Korean PLA veterans to Korea and promised to move an army closer to the Korean border. Once Mao's commitment was secured, preparations for war accelerated.

As American and UN soldiers were already deployed in the war on the South Korean side, it was virtually assured that Soviet forces could not engage in open and direct hostilities against the South without provoking conflicts with other UN countries. Instead, the Soviet Union was compelled to conceal its participation in the conflict (at least to the extent where Soviet involvement could still be plausibly denied by the Soviet government) so as to minimize the risk of escalating the "Cold War" into a "Hot War" with NATO and the United States and its allies elsewhere, which could have led to a nuclear war. By officially denying its participation, the Soviets prevented the Korean War from escalating. Participation on the North Korean side was also contrary to the UN Security Council Resolution 84 by which the Soviet Union was technically bound.

== Soviet aid to the North Korean forces ==
=== Medical aid ===
Along with several "Eastern Bloc" countries (notably Czechoslovakia), the Soviet Union sent over 20 doctors to Korea to aid Communist forces there, similar to Indian, Italian, Norwegian, Danish and Swedish medical detachments in Southern Korea who did not have military force engaged, but merely offered humanitarian support instead.

=== Material aid ===
Soviet military aid was instrumental to equipping both the North Korean and Chinese forces fighting in Korea. The Soviet PPSh-41 submachine gun (nicknamed by US forces the "Burp Gun" after the sound it made) was widely supplied to both countries' armies, as was the T-34/85 medium tank which was of great importance during the initial offensives by the Communist side when no US armour (particularly the M24 Chaffee light tank) or anti-tank rockets (such as the M9 2.36-inch Bazooka) could penetrate its heavy sloped armour.

Soviet material aid was also fundamental for the air forces of both North Korea and China. By April 1950, the Soviet Union had provided 63 of the North Korean Air Force's 178 aircraft, which until September 1950 proved highly effective against minimal South Korean air defenses (which was more heavily backed by US and UN air forces instead)

== Soviet air intervention ==
64th Fighter Aviation Corps 64-й истребительный авиационный корпус (64 иак)
- Active: 15 November 1950 – December 1954
- Country: Soviet Union
- Allegiance: Soviet Union; North Korea; People's Republic of China
- Branch: Air Force
- Role: Bomber and fighter interception
- Size: 844 officers, 1153 NCOs and 1274 other ranks over duration of conflict.
- Garrison/HQ: HQ at Mukden, China; Squadrons located at Mukden, Anshan and Antung Air Bases, China
- Equipment: MiG-15 Jet Fighters

An important area in which Soviet intervention was key in the Korean War was in the air-war. Soviet innovation in aircraft design, as well as the experience of many of its pilots following the Second World War meant that the 'new' states of China and North Korea were dependent on Soviet help in this area.

Both the Chinese and North Korean air forces were structured and equipped along Soviet lines because of the help that the Soviet Union had given them in their first years. In October 1950, the Chinese air force comprised only two fighter divisions, one bomber regiment, and one attack aircraft regiment (a total of two hundred combat planes) and was very much in its infancy. The Chinese committed several Air Regiments to Korea, and these were equipped with the Soviet-supplied MiG-15 fighters, however lack of training meant that the Chinese high command was anxious for Soviet pilots, some of whom were already in China tasked with training the pilots for the Chinese air force. Frustrated by the quality and shortage of Chinese pilots, in November 1950, Stalin took the decision to involve Soviet air force pilots in the war, flying under the markings of the Chinese People's Liberation Army Air Force (PLAAF) or North Korean People's Army Air Force (KPAAF). Soviet air units dispatched to northeastern Manchuria to train Chinese pilots on the MiG-15 were first to see aerial combat against American aircraft on 1 November 1950.

In addition to the widely known MiG-15 force of 64th Fighter Corps, there were also significant anti-aircraft gun, searchlight and technical units despatched to Manchuria as part of the same unit.

=== Soviet pilots ===
- Aleksandr Smorchkov (12)
- Nikolay Ivanov (6)
- Semyon Fedorets (7)
- Yevgeny Pepelyayev (19)
- Sergei Kramarenko (13)
- Nikolai Sutyagin (22)

Soviet pilots were active in Korea from November 1950. In order to hide this direct Soviet intervention, precautions were taken to disguise their involvement, open knowledge of which would have been a major diplomatic embarrassment for the USSR.

Soviet pilots wore Chinese uniforms when flying, whilst rules were prescribed to stop Soviet pilots flying near the coast or front lines (where they might be captured if shot down) and from speaking Russian on the aircraft radio. All aircraft flown carried Chinese or North Korean markings. When not flying, for reasons of ethnicity, on the ground Soviet pilots 'played' the roles of Soviet commercial travellers rather than Chinese or North Korean soldiers.

Soviet pilots flying MiG-15 jets participated in battles around the Yalu River Valley on the Chinese-Korean border in the area known as "Mig Alley" and in operations against UN "trainbusting" attacks in Northern Korea, with considerable success.

The lack of a shared language between Soviet, Chinese and North Korean pilots frequently led to friendly fire as other MiG fighters were mistaken for American F-86 Sabre jets and shot down.

=== MiG-15s ===
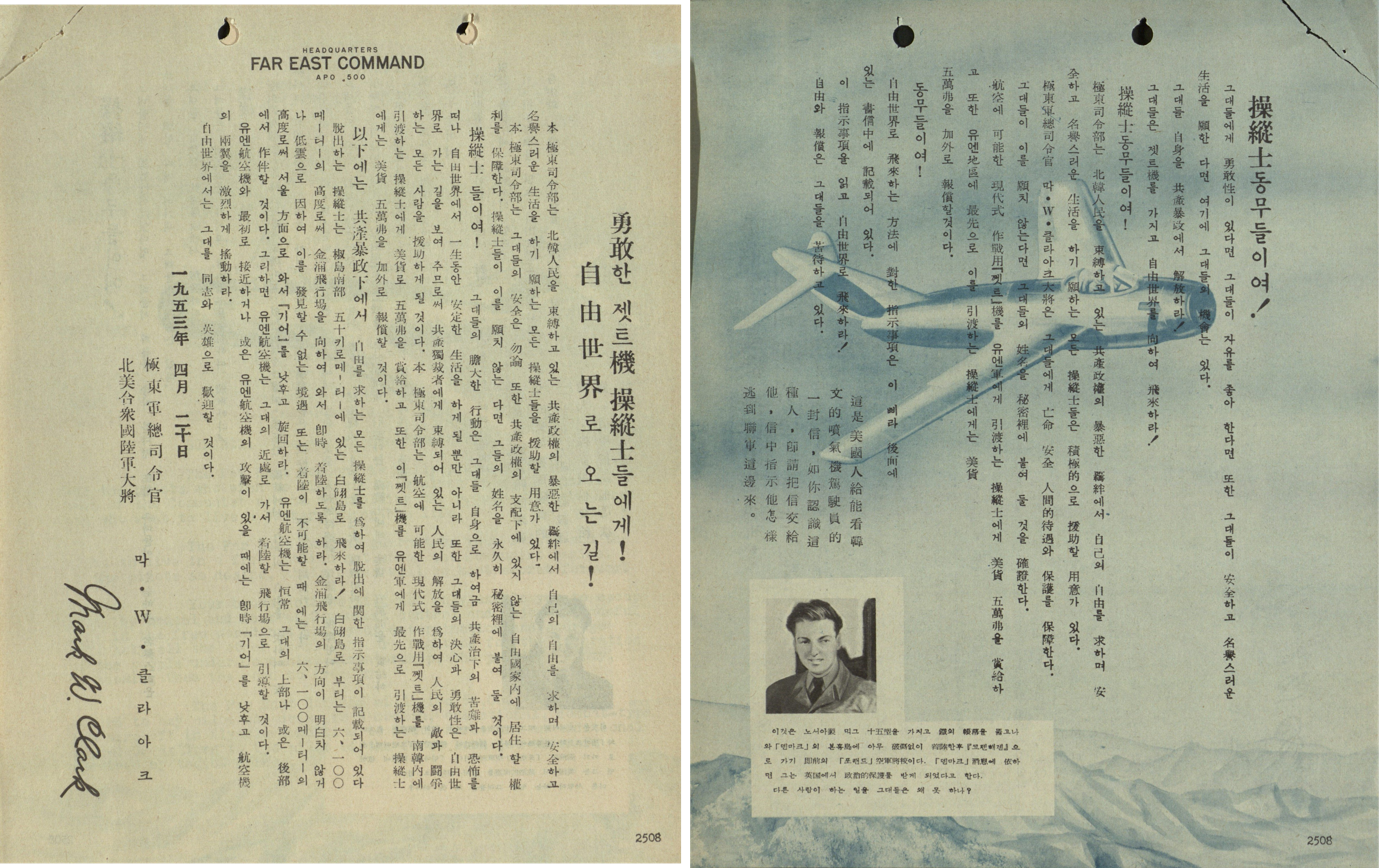
A UN leaflet promising a $100,000 reward to the first North Korean pilot to deliver a jet fighter to UN forces. These were translated into Chinese, Korean and Cyrillic

The MiG-15 was a jet aircraft, supplied in large numbers to Chinese and North Korean forces during the war by the Soviet Union. Owing to their modern design (they were at least a match for the best American jet fighter of the time, the F-86 Sabre), they played a pivotal role in the air war.

At the outbreak of the war, the North Koreans flying Soviet aircraft like the IL-10 ground attack aircraft and Yak-9P fighters were easily outclassed by modern American jet aircraft such as Lockheed F-80 Shooting Star and Republic F-84 Thunderjet fighters, which meant that UN forces quickly achieved air superiority.

By contrast, when the MiG-15 appeared in Korea, it immediately challenged this air superiority, since it could outclass all fixed-wing American jets in Korea at the time (not to mention the aged propeller-driven P-51 Mustang). It is believed that Soviet pilots (who all flew MiG-15s) shot down 142 - 1,106 UN aircraft (depending on whose estimate is used) during the duration of the war, a higher kill total than that of comparable UN units. Despite this superior performance, the MiGs main goal was to counter the USAF B-29 Superfortress bombers rather than dogfight with other fighters.

Recognising the importance of the MiG, the UN command devised Operation Moolah to encourage a MiG pilot to defect to South Korea with a functional MiG for testing. A reward of $100,000 (USD) and political asylum were offered as a reward and North Korean pilot Lieutenant No Kum-Sok eventually defected in September 1953, finally providing the US with an example for testing. Kum-Sok later said that he was unaware of the award.

== Contemporary awareness of Soviet participation ==
Though the Soviet Union never acknowledged its participation in the conflict, it is clear that many suspected it. Soviet pilots, though forbidden from communicating in any language other than basic Korean across their radios, often resorted to Russian when stressed or when swearing. This was picked up by Commonwealth and US pilots.

Reports of Soviet involvement in the conflict quickly made their way up the United Nations chain of command. Nevertheless, reports of covert Soviet involvement were always denied by the Soviet Union, and the United States government was not inclined to press the issue so as to avoid escalating tensions further. Over time, both superpowers came to see the situation as a unique opportunity to test their aviation technology and tactics in combat against the forces of the opposing superpower without the conflict spiraling into World War III.

It was only recently, through the publication of books by Chinese and Russian authors, such as Zhang Xiaoming, Leonid Krylov, Yuriy Tepsurkaev and Igor Seydov, that the extent of the Soviets' participation became clear.

== Legacy for Sino-Soviet relations ==
Contrary to expectations, the Soviet intervention in Korea did not inspire the Chinese leadership with confidence. Mao, in particular, felt betrayed that the Soviet leadership had refused to send infantry and armoured units, in addition to its MiG squadrons, and join the conflict openly beside China. There is evidence that the Chinese felt restricted by the Russians, who forced them to defer to the Soviet Union for technological and strategic support, but offered only minor support in exchange. Furthermore, the Chinese leadership felt humiliated by the Soviet decision to make the Chinese pay them for all the material support that they had received, which "made the Soviets seem more like arms merchants than genuine Communist internationalists."

In effect, Zhang Xiaoming argues that the Chinese came to feel that the Soviet Union was both an unreliable and demanding ally and took greater steps to ensure autarky from the USSR in the years following the War. In 1960, China broke from the Soviet Union in an event known today as the Sino-Soviet split, creating a rift amongst all communist powers which were expected to pick one side of the divide. The North Korean regime, which bordered both countries, successfully navigated the split by playing one power off the other. It did not firmly align with either power until the Soviet reforms under Mikhail Gorbachev compelled the regime to align with China.

This split, certainly influenced by the Korean War, shaped relations between the two countries until 1989.

== See also ==
- China in the Korean War
- Soviet Union in the Vietnam War
- People's Volunteer Army
- Soviet Volunteer Group
- Operation Rimon 20
