= Qin Kai (general) =

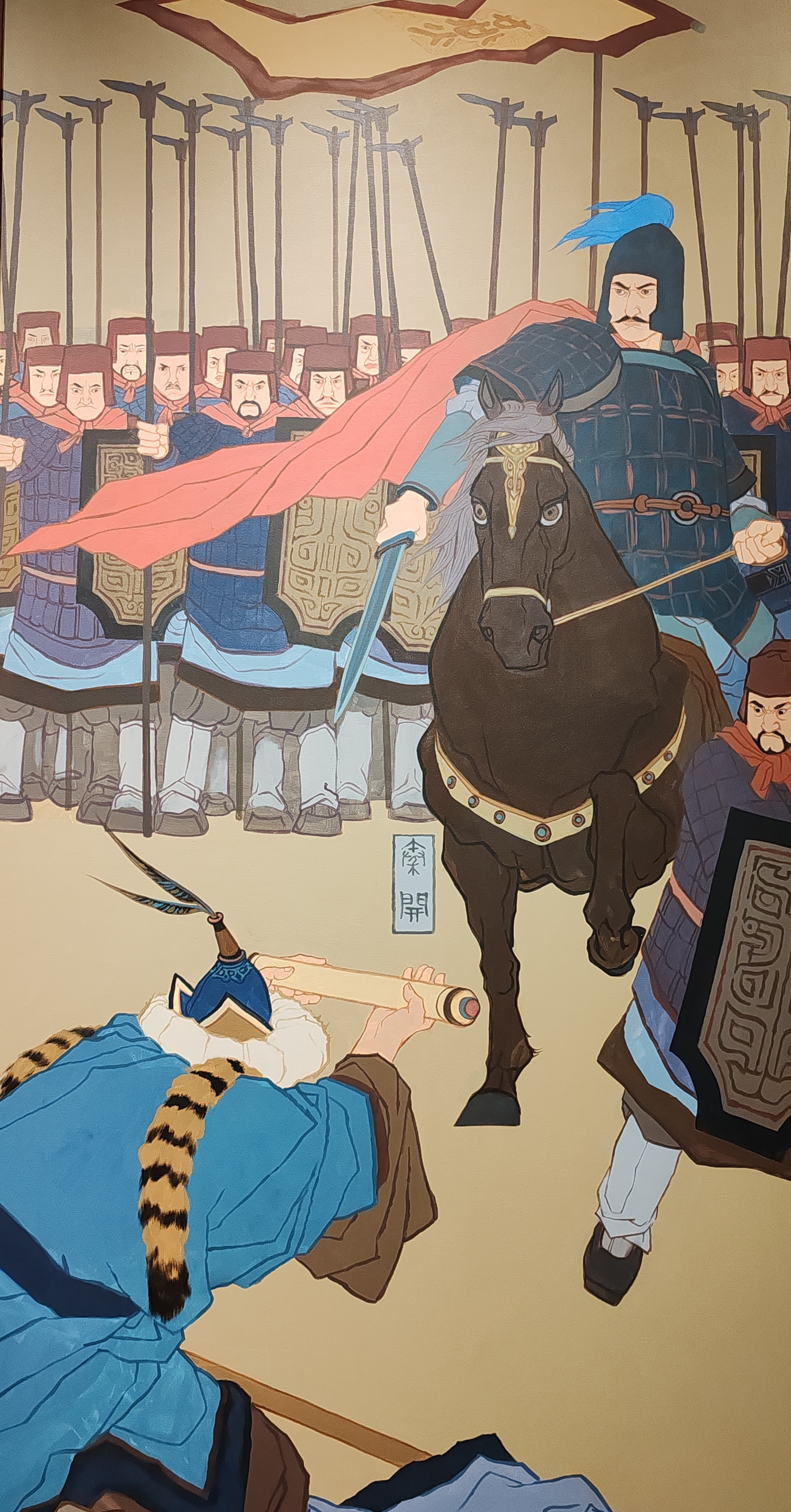
Conquer of Donghu by Qin Kai

Qin Kai (simplified Chinese: 秦开; traditional Chinese: 秦開), was a general of the Kingdom of Yan during the Warring States period of China. He was at one time sent by Yan to Donghu as a hostage. After returning to Yan, around 300 BC, he defeated the Donghu and conquered Liaodong Peninsula, wrestling it from Gojoseon. In Jianchang County, he found a relic of Yan (state) period.

Qin Kai was the grandfather of Qin Wuyang.

== See also ==
- Gojoseon–Yan War
