= Xi of Yan =

Chinese king of Yan state from 255 to 222 BC

Xi of Yan 燕王喜

King of Yan
- Reign: 255–222 BCE
- Predecessor: King Xiao
- Successor: None (state annexed by Qin)
- Issue: Crown Prince Dan
Names
- Ancestral name: Jī (姬); Lineage name: Yān (燕); Given name: Xǐ (喜)
- House: Ji
- Dynasty: Yan
- Father: King Xiao of Yan

Xi, King of Yan (Chinese: 燕王喜; pinyin: Yān Wáng Xǐ; fl. 255–222 BC; r. 255–222 BC) was the last monarch of the Yan state. He was the son of King Xiao whom he succeeded.

In the 28th year of his reign (227 BC), the Qin state began its conquest of Yan, and its army approached Yishui (易水; modern-day Yi County, Hebei). Seeing the threatening situation in which Yan was in, Crown Prince Dan, King Xi's son, sent assassins Jing Ke, Qin Wuyang and others to kill Zheng, King of Qin, under the guise of presenting him with a map of Dukang (督亢) and the severed head of the Qin general Huan Yi. As Jing Ke unrolled the map in front of King Zheng, the dagger was revealed, and the assassination failed. This failure only helped to fuel the rage and determination of the King of Qin, who increased the number of troops sent to conquer Yan and ordered Wang Jian to destroy Yan. The bulk of the Yan army was at the frozen Yishui River. The Yan army was defeated in 226 BC and Xi fled to the Liaodong Commandery. To appease King Zheng, King Xi had his own son executed by decapitation, and his head presented to King Zheng.

In 222 BC, Liaodong fell to Qin, and Yan was totally conquered by Qin under the general Wang Ben. King Xi was captured alive, and his fate is not known. Yan was the third last state among the Seven Warring States to fall, and with its destruction the fate of the remaining two Chinese kingdoms was sealed.

Regnal titles
Preceded by King Xiao of Yan	King of Yan; 255 BC – 222 BC	Succeeded by Han Guang
