= Yan (state) =

Ancient state in northern China (11th century BC – 222 BC)

Yan 燕
- 11th century BC–222 BC
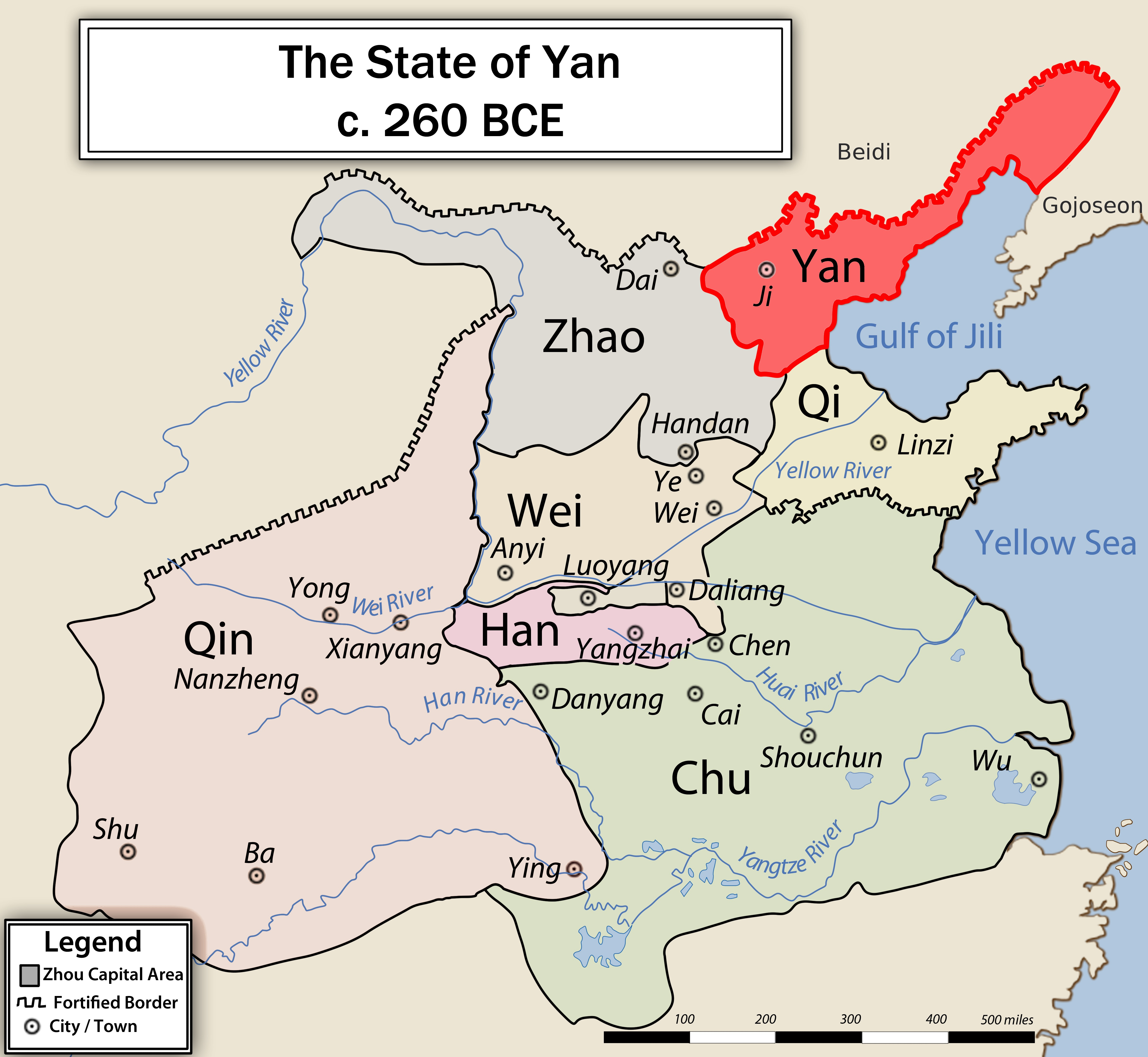
- Status: Kingdom/Principality
- Capital: Ji (蓟); Xiadu
- Government: Monarchy
- Historical era: Zhou dynasty
  - Established: 11th century BC
  - Rebellion of the Three Guards: c. 1042–1039 BC
  - Conquered by Qin: 222 BC
- Currency: knife money spade money other ancient Chinese coinage
Succeeded by
Qin dynasty

Yan
- "Yān" in ancient seal script (top) and modern (bottom) Chinese characters
- Chinese: 燕
- Hanyu Pinyin: Yān
Transcriptions
Standard Mandarin
- Hanyu Pinyin: Yān
- Bopomofo: ㄧㄢ
- Gwoyeu Romatzyh: Ian
- Wade–Giles: Yen^{1}
- IPA: [jɛ́n]
other Mandarin
- Xiao'erjing: ياًنْ
Yue: Cantonese
- Yale Romanization: Yin or Yīn
- Jyutping: Jin3 or Jin1
Southern Min
- Tâi-lô: Ian
Old Chinese
- Baxter–Sagart (2014): *ʔˤe[n]

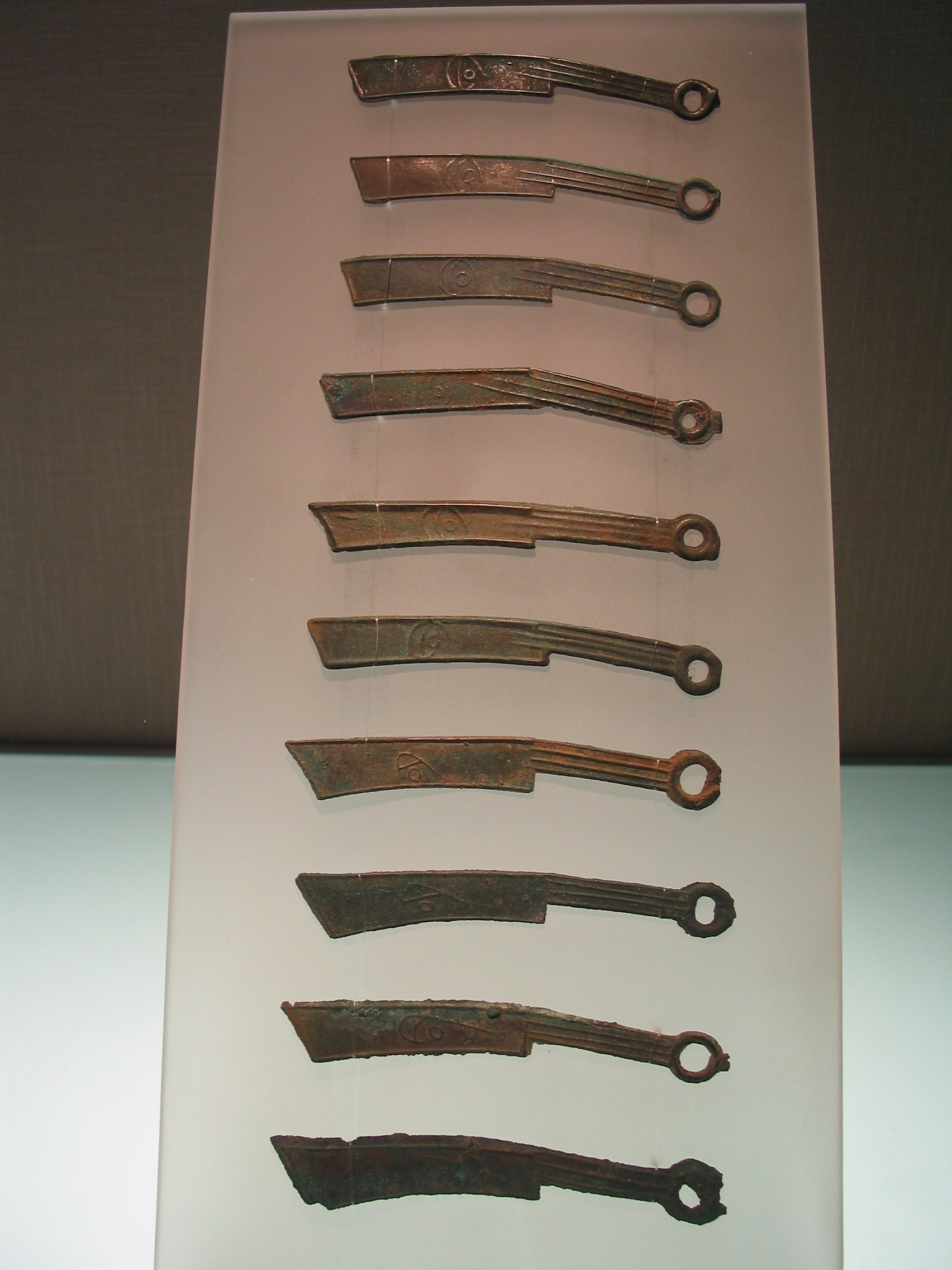
Yan State knife money has been found in Beijing, Tianjin, Hebei, Shanxi, Shandong, Henan, Inner Mongolia, Liaoning, Jilin, Shaanxi, South Korea, Kyūshū and Naha.

Yan (Chinese: 燕; pinyin: Yān; Old Chinese pronunciation: *ʔˤe[n]) was an ancient Chinese state during the Zhou dynasty. Its capital was Ji (later known as Yanjing and now Beijing). During the Warring States period, the court was also moved to another capital at Xiadu at times.

The history of Yan began in the Western Zhou in the early first millennium BC. After the authority of the Zhou king declined during the Spring and Autumn period in the 8th century BC, Yan survived and became one of the strongest states in China. During the Warring States period from the 5th to 3rd centuries BC, Yan was one of the last states to be conquered by the armies of Qin Shihuang: Yan fell in 222 BC, the year before the declaration of the Qin Empire. Yan experienced a brief period of independence after the collapse of the Qin dynasty in 207 BC, but it was eventually absorbed by the victorious Han.

During its height, Yan stretched from the Yellow River to the Yalu River and from the mountains of Shanxi to the Liaodong Peninsula. As the northernmost of all the Chinese states during this time period, Yan faced incursions from steppe nomads and as such, built great walls.

== History ==
According to Sima Qian's Records of the Grand Historian, King Wu of Zhou deposed Di Xin of Shang at the Battle of Muye (c. 1046 BC) and conferred titles to nobles within his domain, including the rulers of the Yan.

In the 11th century BC, Yan's capital was based in what is now Liulihe Township, Fangshan District, Beijing, where a large walled settlement and over 200 tombs of nobility have been unearthed. Shang oracle bones indicate the existence of an earlier Yan polity whose rulership may have been deposed. Among the most significant artifacts from the Liulihe Site is a bronze ding with inscriptions that recount the journey of the eldest son of the Duke of Yan, who delivered offerings to the King of Zhou in present-day Xi'an and was awarded a position in the king's court.

Some time during the 7th century BC in the late Western Zhou or early Eastern Zhou, Yan absorbed the State of Ji, a smaller kingdom to the north, and moved its capital to Ji, in modern-day Xicheng District, Beijing.

To the south, the bordering states of Zhao and Qi were Yan's main rivals. The mountainous border in the west between Zhao and Yan became the area in which their armies often clashed. Despite this, the wars between Zhao and Yan usually dragged on into a stalemate, requiring the help of other kingdoms to conclude.

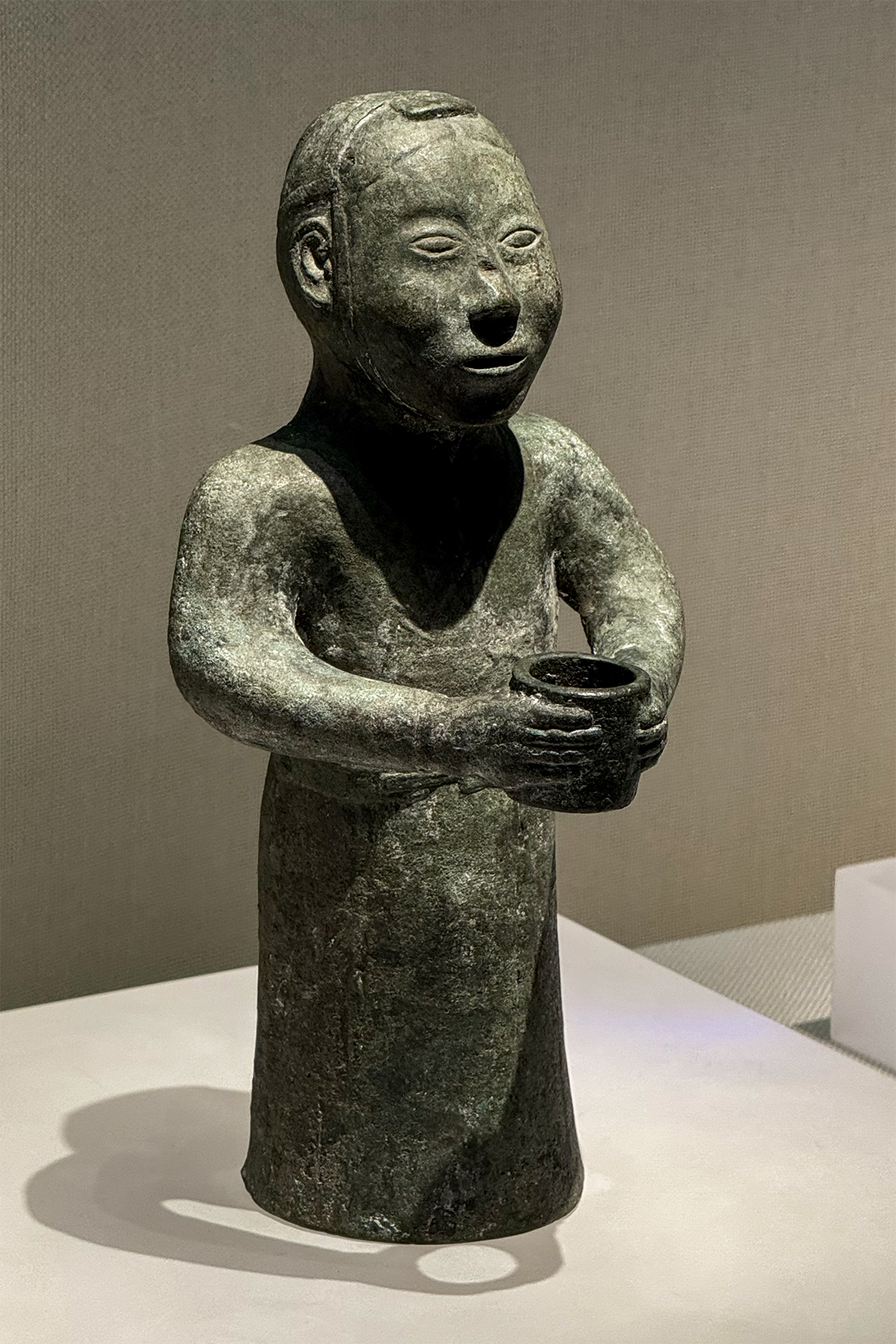
Bronze figurine from the Yan capital Xiadu.

At the turn of the 3rd century BC, General Qin Kai launched a series of campaigns against the Donghu and Gojoseon, expanding the kingdom's frontiers nearly one thousand kilometers east to the northwestern Korean Peninsula. A Great Wall was constructed on Yan's new northern borders, and five commanderies, Shanggu, Yuyang, Youbeiping, Liaoxi and Liaodong, were subsequently established for defense against the Donghu.

The Central Plains states seemed to hold Yan culture and other peripheral states like Qin in low regard. Archaeological discoveries in the state of Yan have uncovered ornaments that, while inscribed with Chinese writing, were close in style to that of the northern nomadic tribes. The currency of Yan was crafted into the shape of a knife, a form closely associated with the nomads. This form of currency might have been specially made for trade with the nomads, demonstrating the importance of commercial relations with them.

The strongest opposition came from the Qi, one of the strongest states in China. A succession crisis started in Yan in 325 BC when king Zikuai symbolically resigned his throne in favor of his minister Zizhi to prove his humility; the minister took advantage and seized power. While this crisis happened, in 314 BC Qi invaded and in a little over several months practically conquered the country. However, due to the misconduct of Qi troops during the conquest of Yan, a revolt eventually drove them away and the borders of Yan were restored. Yan's new king, King Zhao of Yan then plotted with the states of Zhao, Qin, Han and Wei to launch a joint expedition against Qi. Led by the brilliant tactician Yue Yi, it was highly successful and within a year most of Qi's seventy walled cities had fallen, with the exception of Zimu and Lu. However, with the death of King Zhao and the expulsion of Yue Yi to Zhao by the new king, King Wei of Yan, General Tian Dan managed to lead Qi's forces to recapture all of the cities from the 5 kingdoms.

Despite the wars, Yan survived through the Warring States period. In 227 BC, with Qin troops on the border after the collapse of Zhao, Crown Prince Dan sent an assassin named Jing Ke to kill the king of Qin (later Qin Shi Huang), hoping to end the Qin threat. The mission failed, with Jing Ke dying at the hands of the King of Qin in Xianyang.

Surprised and enraged by such a bold act, the king of Qin called on Wang Jian to destroy Yan. Crushing the bulk of the Yan army at the frozen Yi River, Ji fell the following year and the ruler, King Xi, fled to the Liaodong Peninsula.

In 222 BC, Liaodong fell as well, and Yan was overrun by Qin. Yan was the third to last state to fall, and with its destruction the fates of the remaining two kingdoms were sealed. In 221 BC, Qin conquered all of China, ending the Warring States period and founding the Qin dynasty.

=== Post-Qin interregnum ===
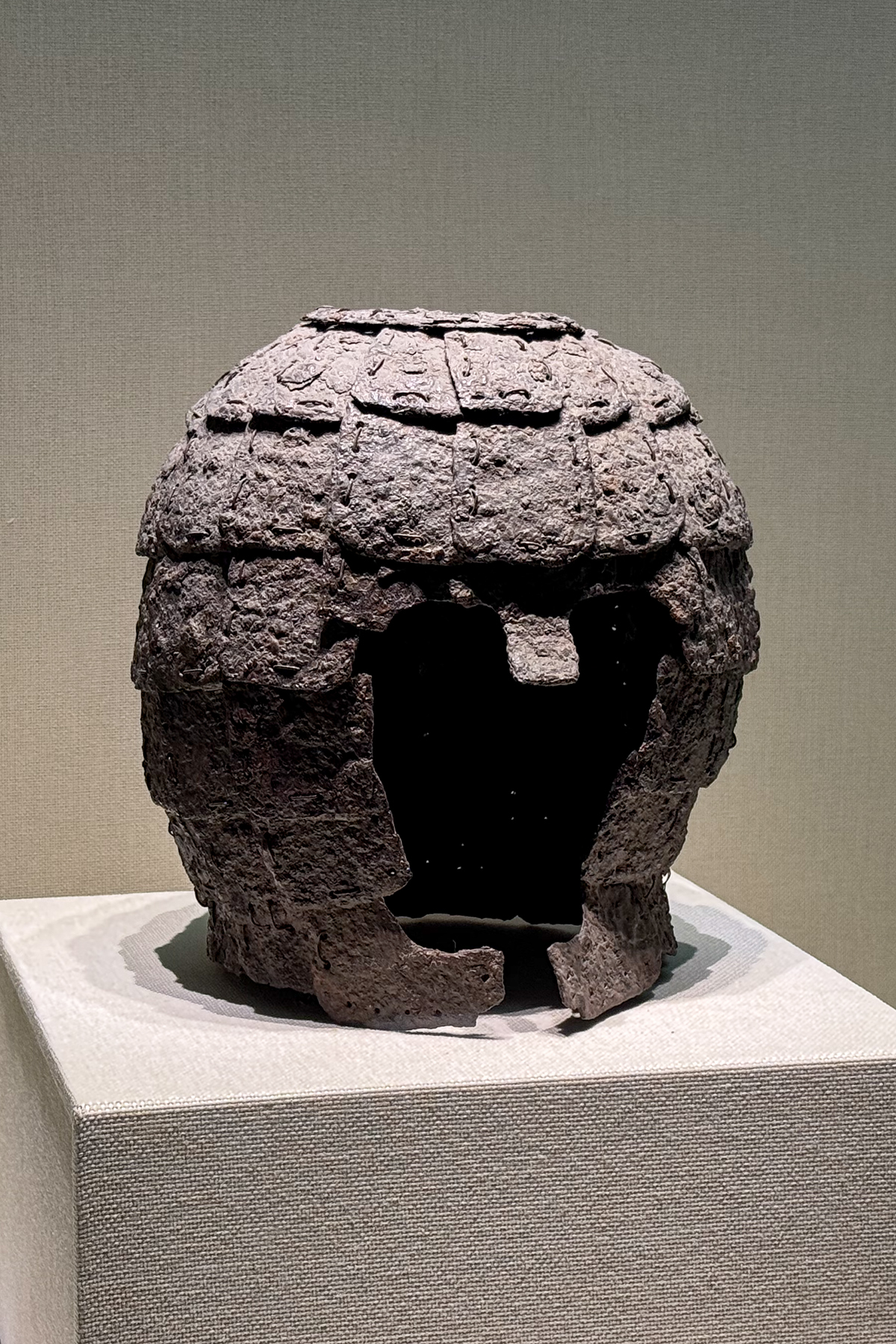
Yan state's iron helmet.

In 207 BC, the Qin dynasty collapsed and China resumed a state of civil war. King Wu Chen of Zhao eventually sent General Han Guang to conquer Yan for Zhao, but upon his conquest, Han Guang appointed himself King of Yan. Han Guang had sent General Zang Tu to assist Xiang Yu, the king of Chu, in his war against Qin. When Zang Tu returned, Han Guang was ordered to become King of Liaodong instead. When Han Guang refused, Zang Tu killed him and declared himself king of both Yan and Liaodong.

Zang Tu submitted Yan to the Han dynasty during the war between Han and Chu in order to keep his title, but once the war was finished he revolted. Liu Bang (later Emperor Gaozu of Han) sent Fan Kuai and Zhou Bo to put down the rebellion, and they captured and executed Zang Tu. His son Zang Yan fled to exile among the Xiongnu.

Lu Wan became the new King of Yan and reigned there for most of Liu Bang's life, until the emperor discovered that he had sent officials to the courts of the rebel Chen Xi and the Xiongnu chanyu Modu. Summoned to the imperial court, Lu Wan feigned illness and then fled to the Xiongnu, who honored him as the King of the Eastern Nomads (Donghu) until his death. In the meantime, Yan came under direct control of the Han dynasty and was treated as a princely appanage.

== Rulers ==
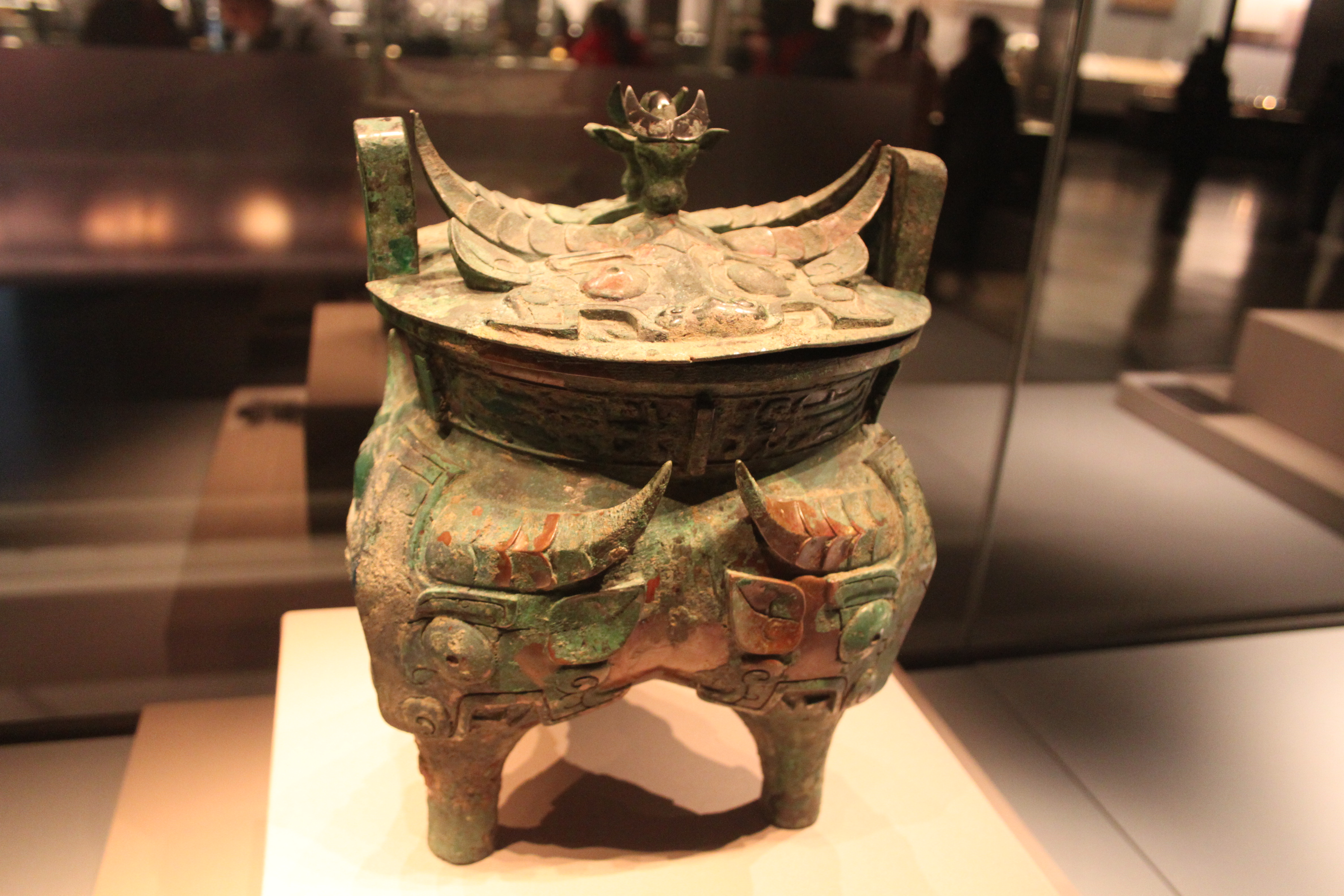
Bronze Li tripod vessel from Yan.

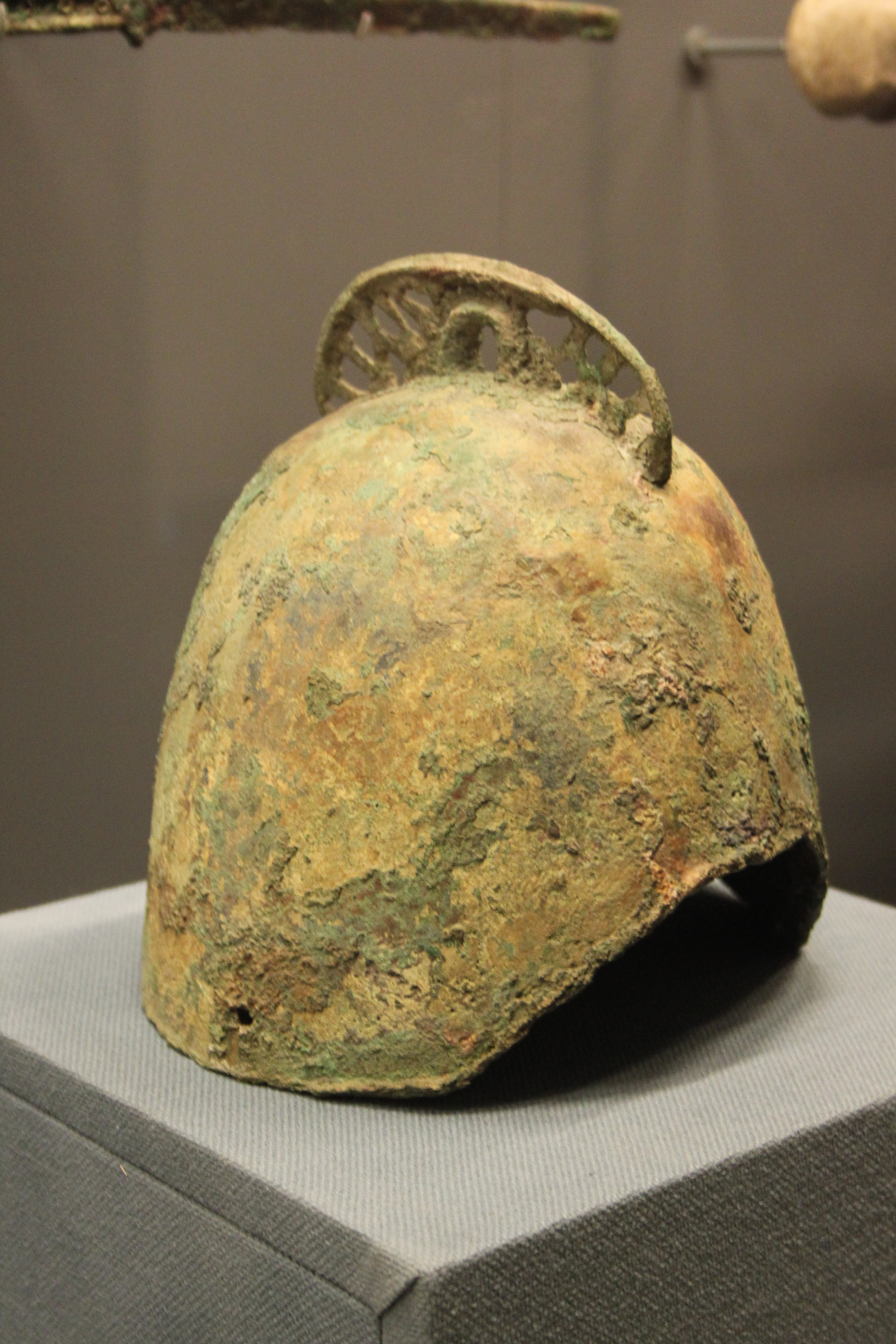
Yan state bronze helmet

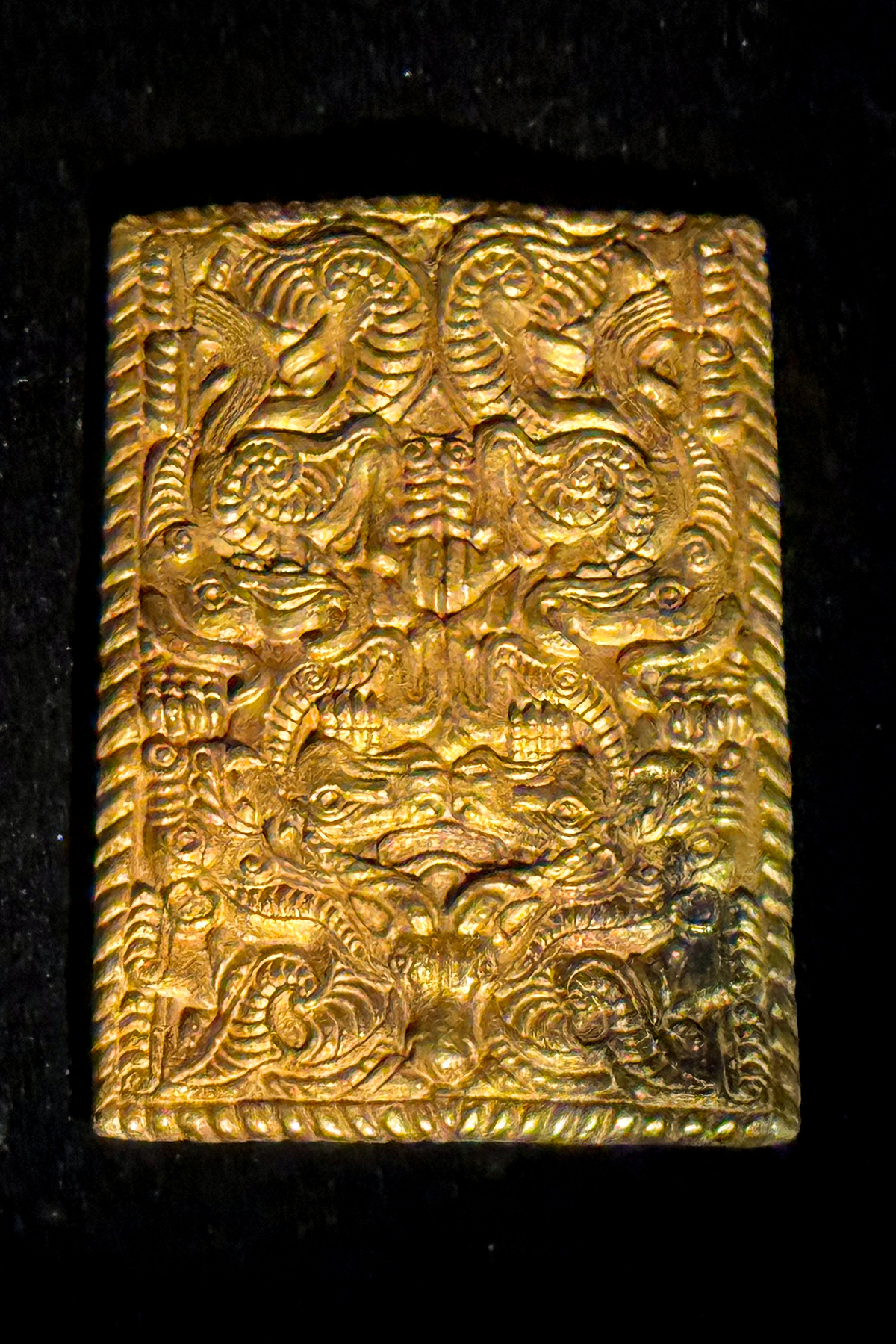
Gold ornaments from Xiadu

- Marquis Hui of Yan (燕惠侯)
- Marquis Li of Yan (燕釐侯)
- Marquis Qing of Yan (燕頃侯)
- Marquis Ai of Yan (燕哀侯)
- Marquis Zheng of Yan (燕鄭侯)
- Marquis Mu of Yan (燕穆侯)
- Marquis Xuan of Yan (燕宣侯)
- Marquis Huan of Yan (燕桓侯)
- Duke Zhuang of Yan (燕莊公)
- Duke Xiang of Yan (燕襄公)
- Duke Huan I of Yan (燕桓公)
- Duke Xuan of Yan (燕宣公)
- Duke Zhao of Yan (燕昭公)
- Duke Wu of Yan (燕武公)
- Duke Wen I of Yan (燕文公)
- Duke Yi of Yan (燕懿公)
- Duke Hui of Yan (燕惠公)
- Duke Dao of Yan (燕悼公)
- Duke Gong of Yan (燕共公)
- Duke Ping of Yan (燕平公)
- Duke Jian I of Yan (燕簡公)
- Duke Xiao of Yan (燕孝公)
- Duke Cheng of Yan (燕成公)
- Duke Min of Yan (燕閔公)
- Duke Jian II of Yan (燕簡公)
- Duke Huan II of Yan (燕桓公)
- Duke Wen II of Yan (燕文公)
- King Yi of Yan (燕易王)
- King Kuai of Yan (燕王噲)
- King Zhao of Yan (燕昭王)
- King Hui of Yan (燕惠王)
- King Wucheng of Yan (燕武成王) ruled 271–258 BCE
- King Xiao of Yan (燕孝王) ruled 257–255 BCE: son of King Wucheng
- Xi (燕王喜) ruled 255–222 BCE: last king of the Yan state

== Rulers family tree ==
Yan state rulers family tree

Yan state

Duke of Shao
1Ke 燕侯克	召伯父辛 召國	□
癸	2Zhi 燕侯旨	Xian 燕侯憲	He 伯龢
3Wu 燕侯舞
6~9？Sheng 燕伯聖	4Xian 燕侯憲 一說即伯憲
5He 燕侯和 一說即伯和
10Marquess Hui 燕惠侯 ?-865-827BC
11Marquess Li 燕-{釐}-侯 ?-827-791BC
12Marquess Qing 燕頃侯 ?-791-767BC
13Marquess Ai 燕哀侯 ?-767-765BC
14Marquess Zheng 燕鄭侯 ?-765-729BC
15Marquess Mu 燕穆侯 ?-729-711BC
16Marquess Xuan 燕宣侯 ?-711-698BC
17Marquess Huan 燕桓侯 ?-698-691BC
18Marquess Zhuang 燕莊公 ?-691-658BC
19Marquess Xiang 燕襄公 ?-658-618BC
20Duke Huan 燕桓公 ?-618-602BC
21Duke Xuan 燕宣公 ?-602-587BC
22Duke Zhao 燕昭公 ?-587-574BC
23Duke Wu 燕武公 ?-574-555BC
24Duke Wen 燕文公 ?-555-549BC
25Duke Yi 燕懿公 ?-549-545BC
26Duke Hui 燕惠公 ?-545-536BC
27Duke Dao 燕悼公 ?-535-529BC
28Duke Gong 燕共公 ?-529-524BC
29Duke Ping 燕平公 ?-524-505BC
30Duke Jian 燕簡公 ?-505-493BC
31Duke Xiao 燕孝公 ?-493-455BC
32Duke Cheng 燕成公 ?-455-439BC
33Duke Min 燕閔公 ?-439-415BC
34Duke Jian 燕簡公 ?-415-370BC
35Duke Huan 燕桓公 ?-370-362BC
36Duke Wen 燕文公
37King Yi 燕易王 ?-333-321BC
38Kuai 燕王噲 ?-321-316-314	Zi Zhi 子之 ?-316-314BC
39King Zhao 燕昭王 ?-312-279BC
40King Hui 燕惠王 ?-279-272BC
41King Wucheng 燕武成王 ?-272-258BC
42King Xiao 燕孝王 ?-258-255BC
43Xi 燕王喜 ?-255-222BC
Crown Prince Dan 太子丹 ?-226

== Yan in astronomy ==
Yan is represented by the star Zeta Capricorni in the "Twelve States" asterism, part of the lunar mansion "Girl" in the "Black Tortoise" symbol. Yan is also represented by the star Nu Ophiuchi in the "Left Wall" asterism in the "Heavenly Market" enclosure.

== Culture and society ==
Bronzeware unearthed at the former Yan capital at Liulihe now on display at the Beijing Capital Museum
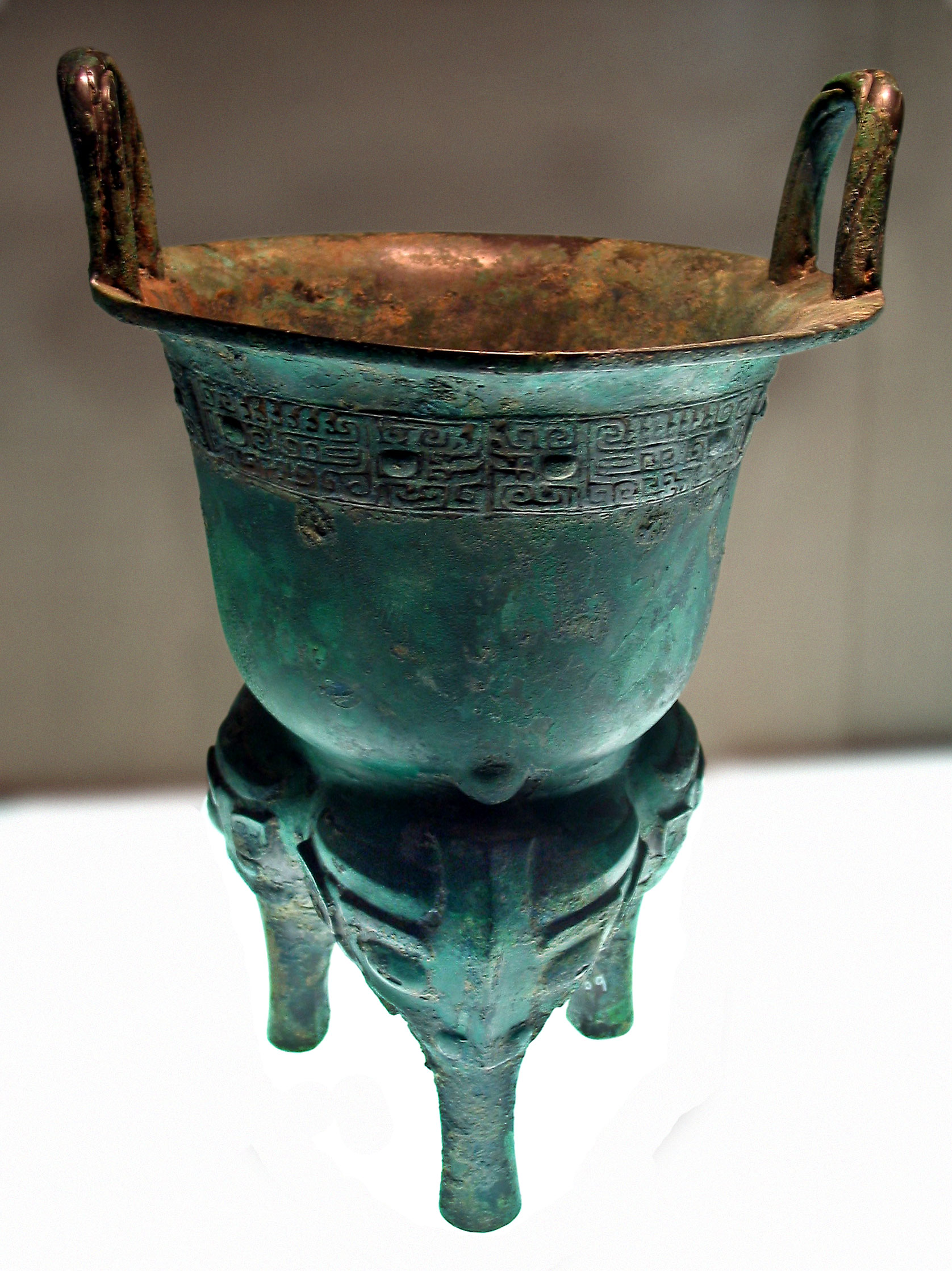
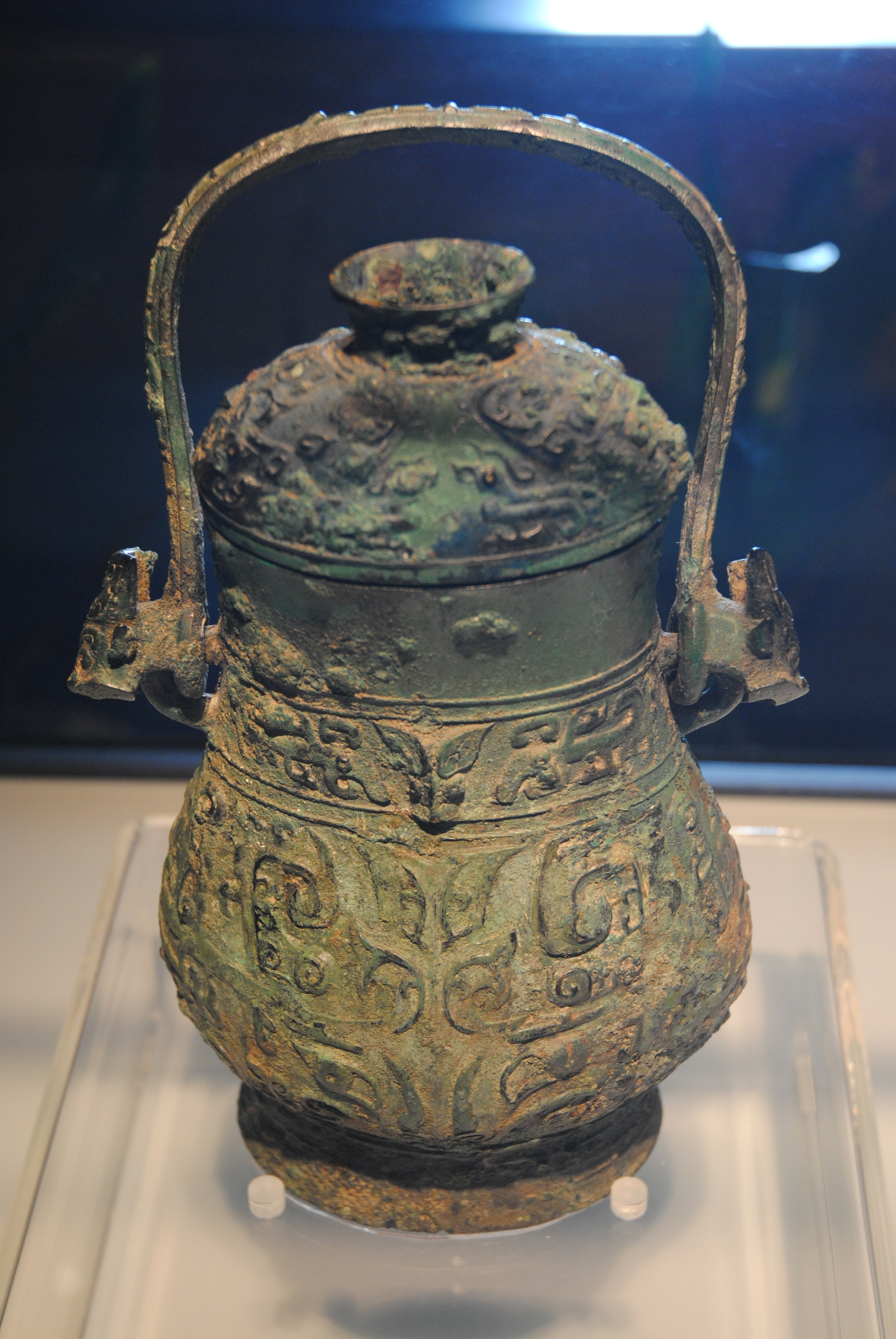
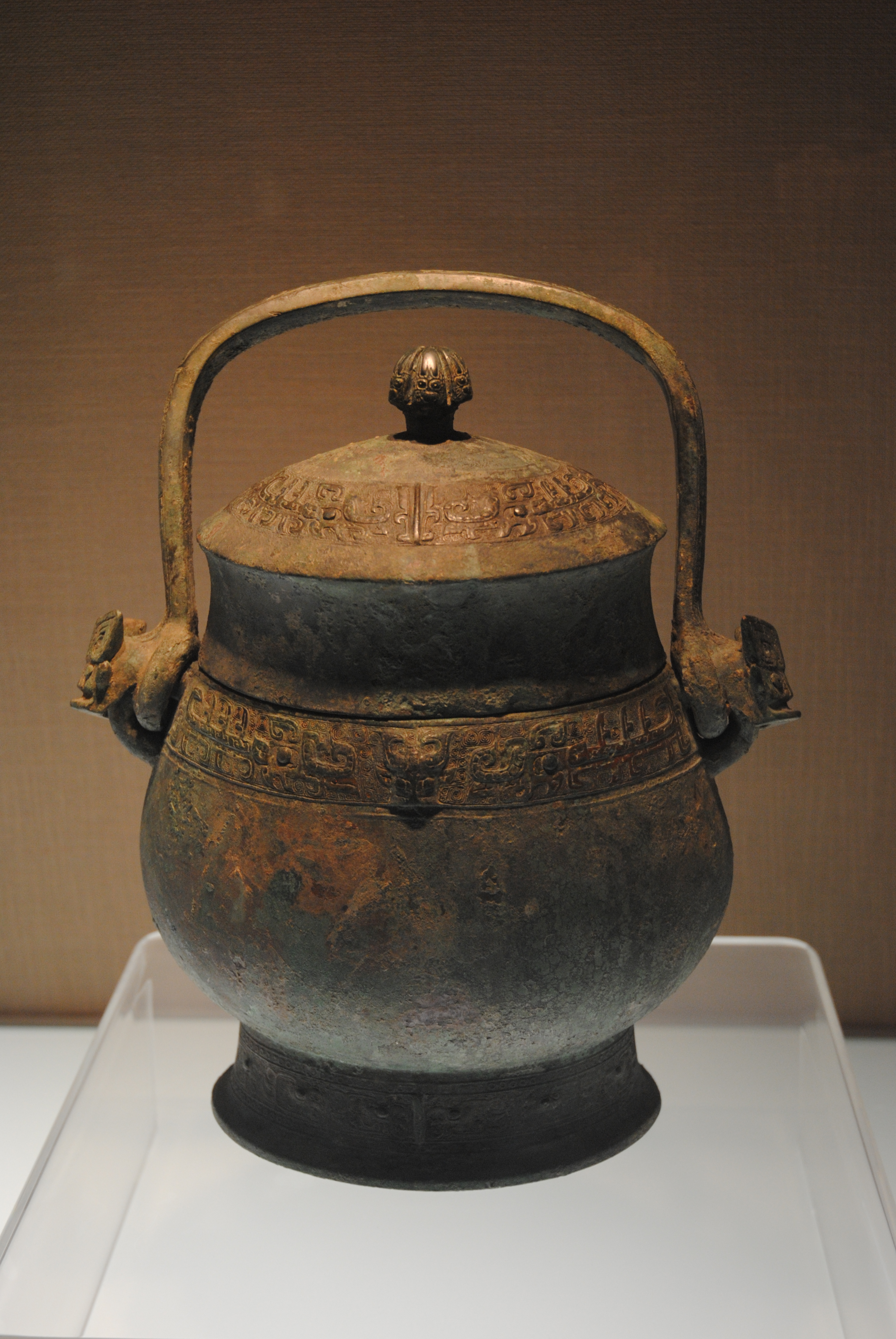
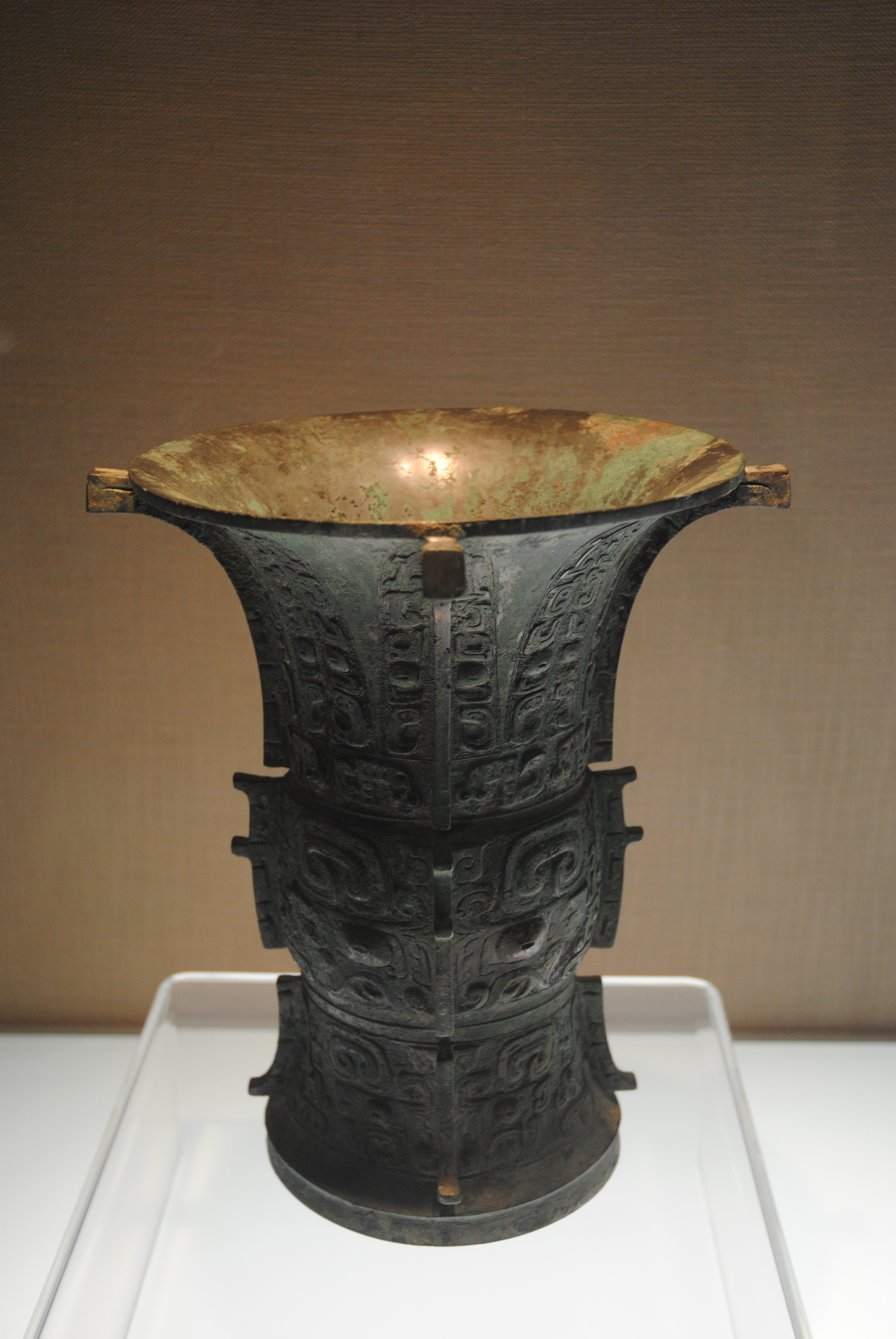

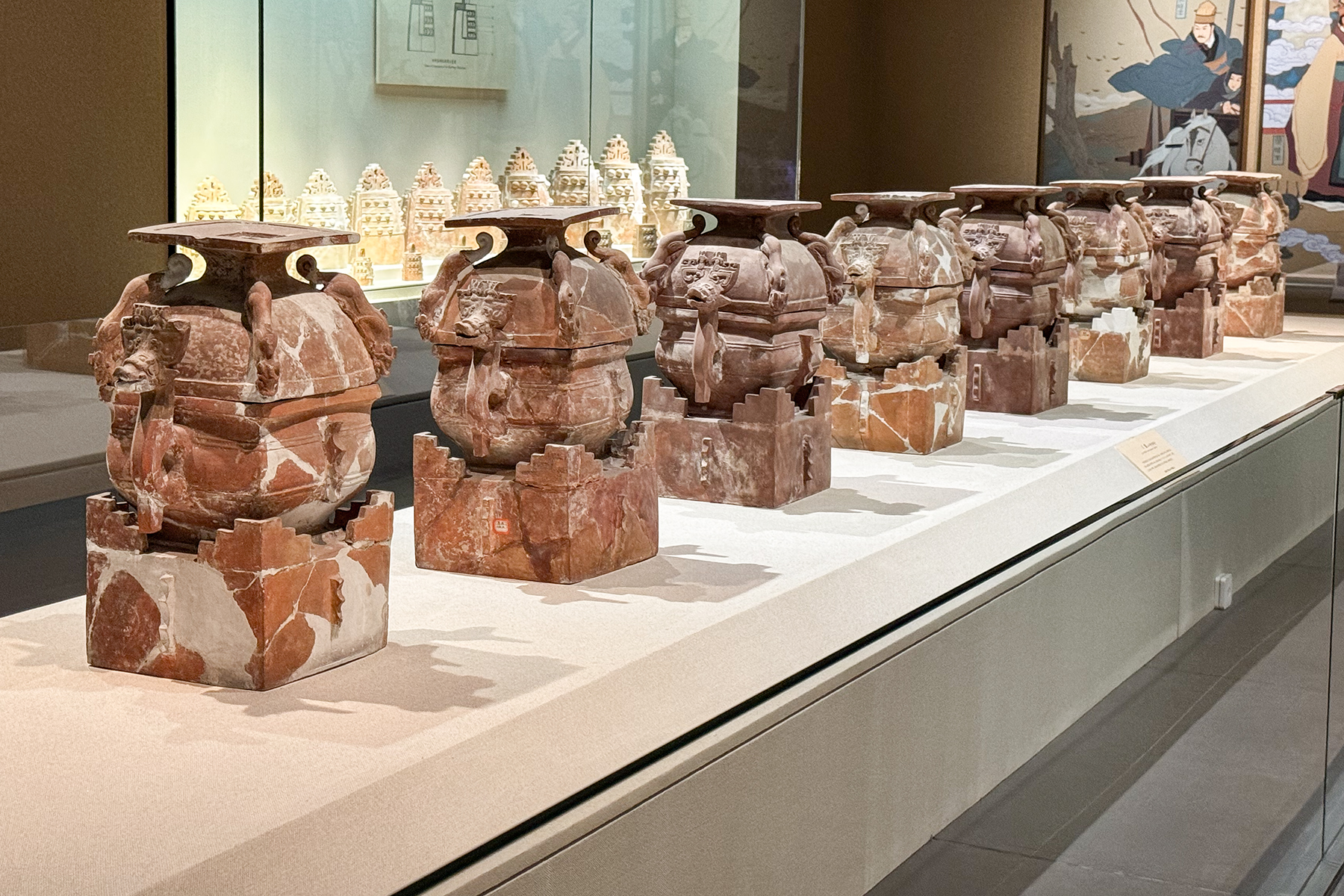
Set of ritual vessels found in the Yan capital Xiadu.

Before the state of Qin unified China in 221 BC, each region had its own unique customs and culture, although all were dominated by an upper class that shared a largely common culture. In the Yu Gong (Tribute of Yu), a section of the Book of Documents which was most likely composed in the 4th century BC, the author describes a China that is divided into Nine Provinces, each with its own distinctive culture and products. The core theme of this section is that these nine regions are unified into one state by the travels of the eponymous sage, Yu the Great and by sending each region's unique goods to the capital as tribute. Other texts also discussed these regional variations in culture and physical environments.

One of these texts was The Book of Master Wu, written in response to a query by Marquis Wu of Wei on how to cope with the other states. Wu Qi, the author of the work, declared that the government and nature of the people were reflective of the terrain they live in. Of Yan, he said:

Yan's defensive formations are solid but lack flexibility (燕陳守而不走).

and:

The Yan are a sincere and straightforward people. They act prudently, love courage and esteem righteousness while rarely employing deception. Thus they excel in defensive positions, but are immobile and inflexible. To defeat them, immediately apply pressure with small attacks and retreat rapidly. When they turn to face our attacks, we should keep a distance. Attack the rear as well where and when they least expect it. When they withdraw to face another threat, chase them. This will confuse their generals and create anxiety in their ranks. If we avoid conflict against their strong points and use our armored chariots to set ambushes, we can capture their generals and ensure victory. (燕性愨，其民慎，好勇義，寡詐謀，故守而不走。擊此之道，觸而迫之，凌而遠之，馳而後之，則上疑而下懼，謹我車騎必避之路，其將可虜)

== See also ==
- Xiadu
- History of Beijing
