= King Yi of Yan =

Chinese king of Yan state from 331 to 321 BC

King Yi of Yan 燕易王

King of Yan
- Reign: 323–321 BCE
- Predecessor: Himself as the Duke of Yan
- Successor: Ji Kuai

Duke of Yan
- Reign: 331–323 BCE
- Predecessor: Duke Wen II of Yan (燕後文公)
- Successor: Himself as the King of Yan
- Born: ?
- Died: 321 BC
- Issue: Ji Kuai
Names
- Ancestral name: Jī (姬); Clan name: Yān (燕); Given name: Unknown
Posthumous name
- King Yi (易王)
- House: Ji
- Dynasty: Yan
- Father: Duke Wen II of Yan

King Yi of Yan (Chinese: 燕易王; died 321 BC), personal name unknown, was a ruler of the Yan state. He ruled as duke from 331 BC to 323 BC, then as king from 323 BC until his death in 321 BC.

He was the son of Duke Wen II of Yan (燕後文公). He came to the throne after his father's death, in the same year, Yan was attacked by the Qi state and lost ten cities. He sent Su Qin to Qi and successfully persuaded King Xuan of Qi to return these cities.

In 323 BC, He promoted himself the king. However, during the last three years of his reign, the court was controlled by the powerful chancellor Su Qin. King Yi died in 321 BC, succeeded by his son Kuai.
