= King Zhao of Yan =

Chinese king of Yan state from 311 to 279 BC

King Zhao of Yan 燕昭王
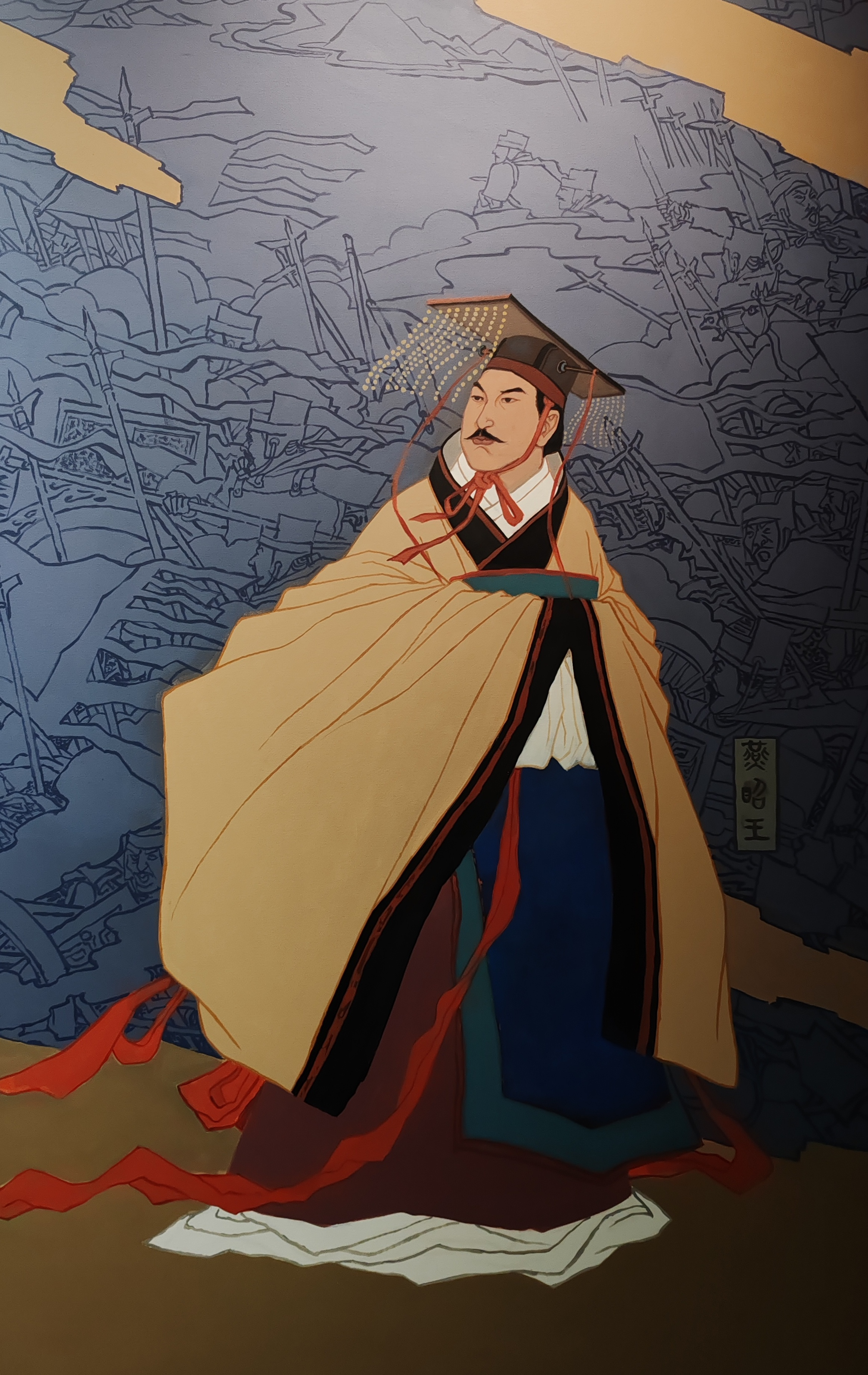

King of Yan
- Reign: 311–279 BCE
- Predecessor: Zi Zhi (子之) (usurper)
- Successor: King Hui
- Born: ?
- Died: 279 BC
- Issue: King Hui of Yan
Names
- Ancestral name: Jī (姬); Clan name: Yān (燕); Given name: Zhí (職)
Posthumous name
- King Zhao (昭王) or King Zhaoxiang (昭襄王)
- House: Ji
- Dynasty: Yan
- Father: Ji Kuai

King Zhao of Yan (Chinese: 燕昭王, died 279 BC), personal name Ji Zhi, was a king of the Yan state. He ruled the kingdom between 311 BC until his death in 279 BC.

King Zhao was a son of Ji Kuai. In early years, he was chosen to serve as a political hostage in the Han state.

In 314 BC, Yan was attacked and practically conquered by the Qi state, and both Ji Kuai and the usurper Zi Zhi (子之) were killed. However, Qi was unable to put down the rebellion in the former territories of Yan and had to withdraw. Finally, the Yan state was restored. King Zhao was installed as the new king of Yan by King Wuling of Zhao, and sent back to Yan.

King Zhao was judicious and measured in his actions toward his subordinates. He hired talents with high salary, these talents include: Yue Yi, Zou Yan (鄒衍), and Ju Xin (劇辛). Yan became a powerful kingdom and was able to take revenge on Qi. In 284, he plotted with the states of Zhao, Qin, Han and Wei for a joint expedition against Qi. Led by the brilliant general Yue Yi, seventy walled cities were taken by the joint expedition, with the exception of Jimo and Ju. King Zhao died in 279 BC, succeeded by his son King Hui.
