= Tian Dan =

Chinese general and nobleman

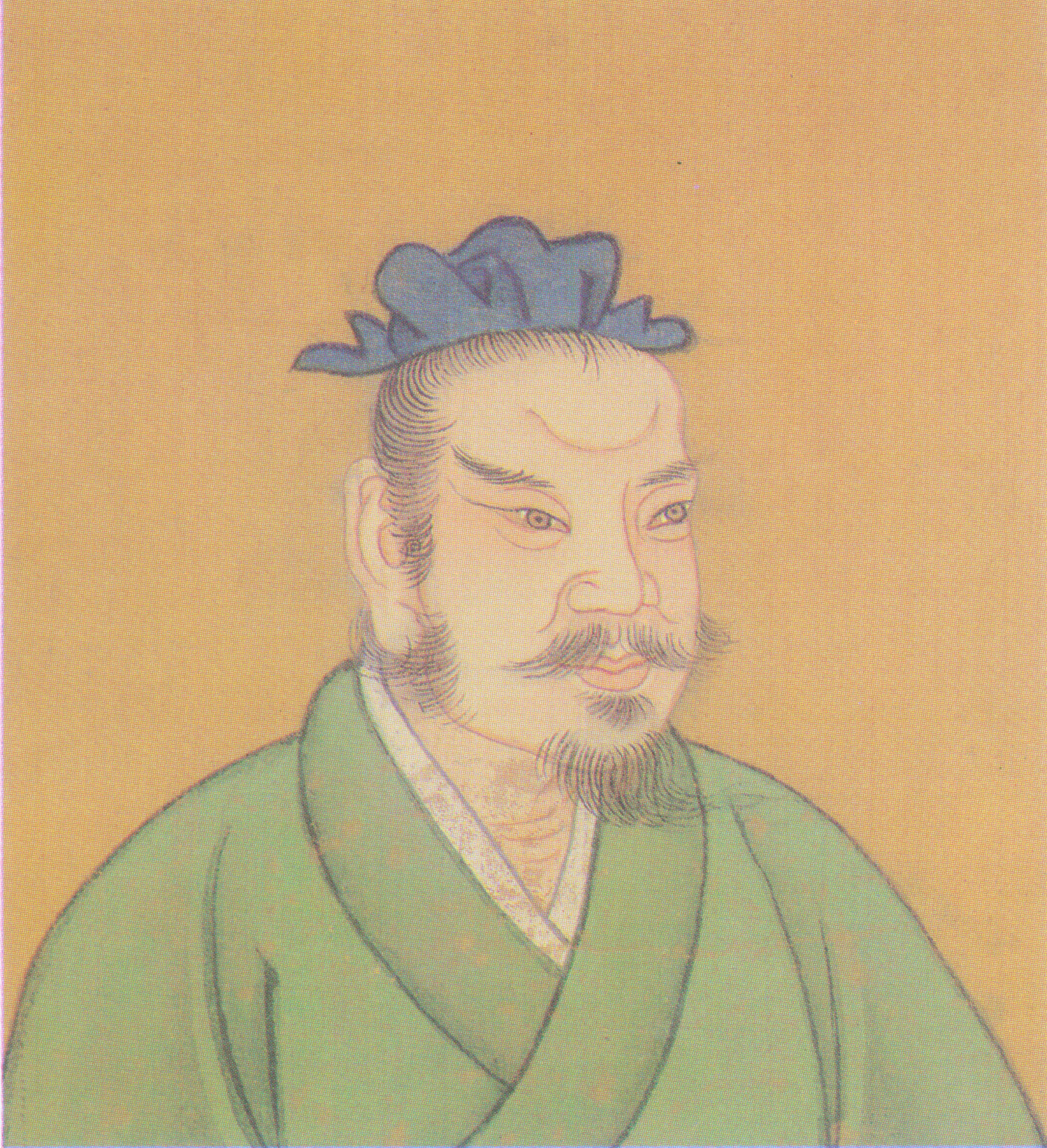
Qing dynasty illustration of Tian Dan

Tian Dan (traditional Chinese: 田單; simplified Chinese: 田单; pinyin: Tián Dān) was a general and nobleman of the major state of Qi during the Warring States period of ancient China. He was known for a spectacular military tactic called "Fire Cattle Columns". After the kingdom was nearly destroyed under the rule of King Min of Qi, he helped regain its territory and restored the king's son. He later fought the Beidi nomads, either in the far north or in areas in or between the various northern Chinese states.

== Yan and Qi conflicts ==
In 314 BC, Zizhi, the Chancellor of Yan Kingdom, rebelled against his king which led to months of internal turmoil within Yan. King Xuan of Qi, desiring to take advantage of Yan's weakened defences, launched a military attack on Ji (near modern Beijing), the capital of Yan. However, the attack was unsuccessful.

In 286 BC, King Min of Qi attacked the state of Song and destroyed it, annexing its land into Qi territory. Although successful, the attack incited hostility against Qi from the remaining six kingdoms. King Zhao of Yan used that development to raise a military alliance against Qi. The army of Yan and its allies under the command of Yue Yi managed to inflict a crushing defeat on Qi, capturing 70 cities. Only two cities remains in Qi possession, Jimo and Ju. King Min was later killed at Ju. His son Tian Fazhang was crowned by the local people as King Xiang of Qi.

Yan army's onslaught led to many of Qi's citizens fleeing. Many of Qi people's chariots were broken due to overuse. However, Tian Dan had reinforced his chariots' axles with metal. Therefore, his family was able to safely escape to Jimo. The Qi citizens in Jimo praised Tian Dan's intelligence and elected Tian Dan as Jimo's military commander after the previous commander was killed in battle.

In 279 BC, King Zhao of Yan died. He was succeeded by King Hui of Yan who disliked his military commander Yue Yi. Tian Dan sent his spies to Yan who created and spread rumours about Yue Yi's possible treachery. The rumours successfully misled King Hui who then dismissed Yue Yi and replaced him with Ji Jie. This enraged the Yan army which deeply respected its former commander.

=== Boosting the morale of Qi troops ===
It was said that Tian Dan had his spies spread the rumour: "If Yan troops cut the noses of Qi prisoners and put them in the first line, Qi troops will be defeated." Yan troops believed the rumour and cut the noses of the Qi prisoners. The Qi army was enraged at this action and in future battles with Yan refused to surrender because they didn't want to be mistreated.

Tian Dan's spies spread another rumour: "If Yan troops dig up Qi ancestor's graves and dishonour the deceased people, it will be very disheartening." Yan troops again believed the rumour and destroyed Qi graves and burned the dead bodies. The Qi people were again enraged and strongly sought revenge.

=== The flaming oxen ===
After boosting Qi's morale and weakening the Yan troops, Tian Dan counter-attacked and retook the lost territory of Qi.

This counter-attack was reliant on an unconventional assault which included inducing panic in a herd of oxen, who were then set upon the Yan army. It is described by Sima Qian in the Records of the Grand Historian within his biography of Tian Dan:

Tian Dan collected more than one thousand oxen from the people in the city. He had them dressed with red silk, and had multicolour lines, like those of dragons, painted on them. Sharp blades were adjusted to their horns, and reeds dipped in grease, so that their tips could be set aflame, were attached to their tails. Several passages were dug in the city walls, and on one night, the oxen were released, followed by five thousand sturdy men. The oxen, their tails on fire, charged the army of Yan, creating panic. The torches attached to the tails illuminated the night, the troops of Yan saw the lines on their bodies, which looked like dragons, and all those who met their horns were either killed or wounded. Then, the five thousand men, their mouths closed with pieces of wood, attacked them. They were followed by the sound of shouts and drums from the city, and all the old people and children struck metal pots. The noise shook heaven and earth. The soldiers of Yan panicked. They were defeated and repelled, and the people of Qi killed the Yan general, Ji Jie. As the army of Yan was falling back, in disorder and confusion, the soldiers of Qi chased it, and destroyed it as they pushed it northwards. All the cities it went through revolted, and rallied to Tian Dan, whose troops grew larger every day. As he surged from one victory to another, the army of Yan was defeated every day, and finally reached the northern bank of the Yellow River. At this time, more than seventy cities had returned back to Qi.
