= Yizong =

Yizong are imperial temple names used for Chinese emperors. It may refer to:

- Emperor Yizong of Tang (833–873), who ruled Tang from 859 to his death
- Emperor Yizong of Western Xia (1047–1067), who ruled Western Xia from 1048 to his death
- Emperor Aizong of Jin (1198–1234), also known as Emperor Yizong of Jin, who ruled Jin from 1224 to his death
- Chongzhen Emperor (1611–1644), also known as Emperor Yizong of Ming, who ruled Ming from 1627 to his death

== See also ==
- Li Hong (652–675), Tang crown prince who was posthumously honored as Emperor Yizong (not to be confused with Emperor Yizong of Tang)
- Uijong of Goryeo
