= Yue Yi =

Chinese military general

- Lord of Changguo; Lord of Wangzhu
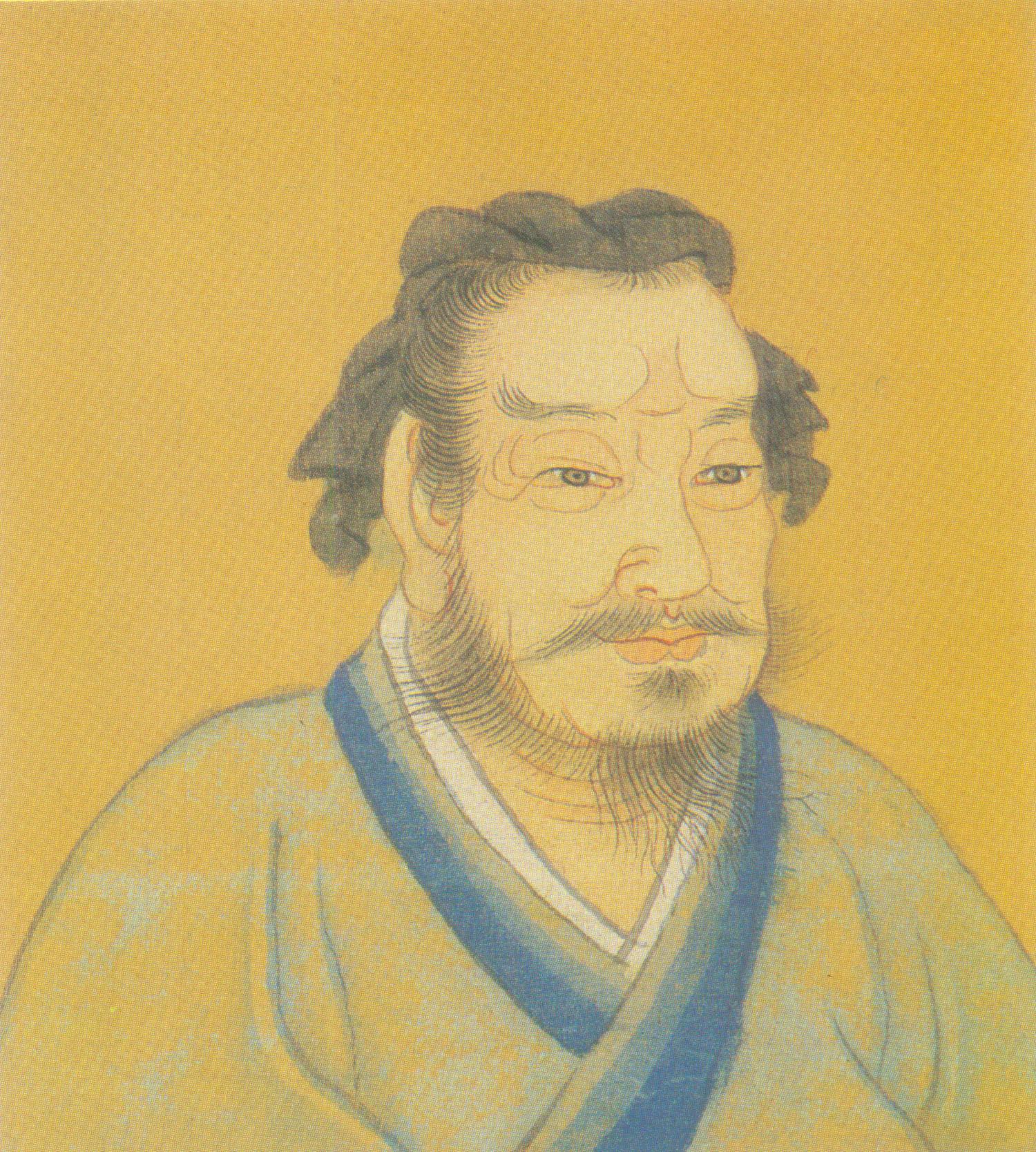
- Issue: Yue Jian

Yue Yi (Chinese: 樂毅), enfeoffed as Lord of Changguo (Chinese: 昌國君), was a Chinese military general. He was a prominent military leader of the State of Yan during the Warring States period of ancient China. He was the son of the prime minister of the state of Zhongshan, but when Zhongshan was destroyed by King Wuling of Zhao, he was forced to wander from country to country. His talents were recognized by King Zhao of Yan, and he was made a minister. He served with great skill and helped forge alliances with the states of Zhao, Wei, Chu, Han and Qin against the threat posed by Qi. He led the allied armies and crushed the Qi forces. The cruel King of Qi was driven away, and, except for two cities, the entire territory of Qi was brought under control. Soon thereafter, King Zhao of Yan suddenly died. Due to the scheming of Tian Dan of Qi, King Hui of Yan mistrusted him and he fled to the state of Zhao, where he was enfeoffed as Lord of Wangzhu (Chinese: 望諸君). His son Yue Jian (樂間) inherited his title Lord of Changguo in Yan.

== Popular culture ==
Yue Yi is one of the 32 historical figures who appear as special characters in the video game Romance of the Three Kingdoms XI by Koei. In the Chinese classical novel Romance of the Three Kingdoms, Zhuge Liang often compares himself with Yue Yi and Guan Zhong.

In the Manga series Kingdom, he was a highly respected Great General of Yan known as "Gaku Ki" and considered as the "Military God" for his feats on the battlefield. In the past, he served as Commander-in-Chief of a Coalition Army that successfully invaded the state of Qi reducing considerably the power of the state.
