= Liang Wang =

Liang Wang may refer to:

== Chinese royalty ==
In Chinese history, Liang Wang (Prince/King of Liang) may refer to:

=== Warring States period ===
- Monarchs of Wei (state), also known as Liang after 334 BC
  - King Hui of Wei (died 319 BC), also known as King Hui of Liang

=== Han dynasty and Shu Han ===
- Peng Yue (died 196BC), King of Liang during the Qin–Han transition, created 203BC
- Liu Wu, Prince of Liang (died 144BC)
- Liu Mai (died 137BC)
- Liu Xiang, Prince of Liang (died 97BC)
- Liu Li (Three Kingdoms) (died 244), Shu Han imperial prince, known as Prince of Liang (梁王) from 221 to 230

=== Sixteen Kingdoms ===
- Liu He (Han-Zhao) (died 310), Former Zhao ruler, known as King of Liang (梁王) after 308
- (Some) kings of Former Liang:
  - Zhang Shi (Former Liang) (reigned 314–320), honored as King of Liang (凉王) posthumously
  - Zhang Mao (reigned 320–324)
  - Zhang Jun (prince) (reigned 324–346)
  - Zhang Chonghua (reigned 346–353)
  - Zhang Zuo (reigned 353–355)
  - Zhang Xuanjing (reigned 355–363)
- Kings of Southern Liang (Sixteen Kingdoms):
  - Tufa Wugu (reigned 397–399)
  - Tufa Lilugu (reigned 399–402)
  - Tufa Rutan (reigned 402–414)
- Kings of Northern Liang:
  - Duan Ye (reigned 397–401)
  - Juqu Mengxun (reigned 401–433)
  - Juqu Mujian (reigned 433–439)
  - Juqu Wuhui (reigned 442–444)
  - Juqu Anzhou (reigned 444–460)
- Kings of Western Liang (Sixteen Kingdoms):
  - Li Gao (reigned 400–417)
  - Li Xin (Western Liang) (reigned 417–420)
  - Li Xun (Western Liang) (reigned 420–421)
- Qifu Gangui (died 412), Western Qin ruler, known as Prince/King of Liang (梁王) from 394 to 395

=== Liang dynasty and Western Liang ===
- Emperor Wu of Liang (464–549), briefly known as Prince of Liang (梁王) in 502 before he founded the Liang dynasty
- Emperor Xuan of Western Liang (519–562), known as Prince of Liang (梁王) from 550 to 555 before he became emperor
- Emperor Jing of Liang (543–558), known as Prince of Liang (梁王) briefly in 555 before he became emperor
- Xiao Zhuang (548-577?), Liang dynasty emperor who fled to Northern Qi in 560, known as Prince of Liang (梁王) after 570

=== Sui–Tang transition ===
- Xiao Xian (583–621), warlord who declared himself King of Liang (梁王) in 617
- Li Gui (warlord) (died 619), warlord who declared himself King of Liang (凉王) in 617
- Shen Faxing (died 620), warlord who declared himself King of Liang (梁王) in 619

=== Tang dynasty and Five Dynasties ===
- Li Zhong (643–665), Tang dynasty imperial prince, known as Prince of Liang (梁王) after 656
- Wu Sansi (died 707), Wu Zetian's nephew, known as Prince of Liang (梁王) from 690 to 705
- Zhu Wen (852–912), late Tang dynasty warlord, known as Prince of Liang (梁王) from 903 to 905 before he founded the Later Liang dynasty
- Guo Zongxun (953–973), Later Zhou emperor, known as Prince of Liang (梁王) briefly in 959 before he became emperor

=== Liao dynasty ===
- Emperor Shengzong of Liao (972–1031), known as Prince of Liang (梁王) from 980 to 982 before he became emperor
- Emperor Xingzong of Liao (1016–1055), known as Prince of Liang (梁王) from 1018 to 1031 before he became emperor
- Emperor Daozong of Liao (1032–1101), known as Prince of Liang (梁王) from 1038 to 1042 before he became emperor
- Emperor Tianzuo of Liao (1075–?), known as Prince of Liang (梁王) from 1081 to 1084 before he became emperor

=== Jin and Yuan dynasties ===
- Wuzhu (died 1148), Jin dynasty imperial prince, posthumously created Prince of Liang (梁王)
- Basalawarmi (died 1382), late Yuan dynasty warlord in Yunnan, also known as Prince of Liang (梁王)

== Other people ==
- Wang Liang (disambiguation), a list of people with the surname Wang

== See also ==
- Liang (disambiguation)
