= Liu Pengli =

- Prince of Jidong
- Born: 劉彭離; 2nd century BC
- House: Han
- Father: Liu Wu

Liu Pengli (Chinese: 劉彭離), also known as the Prince of Jidong (濟東王), was a 2nd-century BC Han prince and has sometimes been claimed to be the first documented serial killer.

== Family ==
Liu Pengli was the grandson of Emperor Wen (r. 180–157 BCE) and the nephew of Emperor Jing (r. 157–141 BCE). Liu Pengli was the third son of Liu Wu, Prince of Liang. Liu Wu's other sons included (in order) Liu Mai, Liu Ming, Liu Ding, and Liu Bushi. as well as five daughters whose names are unknown. The wife of Liu Wu (and the probable mother of Liu Wu's children) was Li Taihou [李氏 English: Queen Li] (d. 125 or 124 BCE)whose ancestry is not known.

== Biography ==
Liu was Prince of Jidong in the sixth year of the middle era of the Emperor Jing of Han (144 BC), the year of his father, Liu Wu's banishment from the capital and death. The Empress Dowager Xiaowen grieved greatly for her younger son and, to placate her (and weaken the powerful fief of Liang), Emperor Jing divided Liang in five and granted a part to each of Liu Wu's sons.

The reasoning behind this division of the inheritance can perhaps be understood by the court official Chao Cuo advice to both Emperor Wen and Emperor Jing that they cut down the sizes of the principalities to make them less threatening. Furthermore, the suggestion was using as excuses offenses that princes had committed, or at very least could be accused of.

Sima Qian's Records of the Grand Historian relates that, "At the age of twenty-nine, he was arrogant and cruel and would go out on marauding expeditions with tens of slaves or young men who were in hiding from the law, murdering people and seizing their belongings for sheer sport. Apparently, Liu Pengli recruited 20–30 individuals with similar predilections to accompany him in the search for victims to rob and kill. Confirmed victims exceeded 100, and these murders were known across the kingdom, so people were afraid of leaving their homes at night. Eventually, the son of one of his victims made an accusation to the Emperor, and the officials of the court requested that Liu Pengli be executed; however, the Emperor could not bear to have his own nephew killed, and Liu Pengli was made a commoner and banished to the county of Shangyong (now Zhushan in Hubei Province).

Previously, the brother of Liu Pengli, Liu Ming had been accused of murdering an officer of the court, and the officials of the court requested that Liu Ming be executed; however, the Emperor could not bear to have his own nephew killed, and Liu Ming was made a commoner and banished to the county of Fangling. In view of this the allegations against Liu Pengli takes on a political motive on the part of Emperor Jing; in which his nephews perceived actions whether real, embellished or fabricated served as an adequate reason for their banishment and loss of position. Thus ridding Emperor Jing of the potential threat of his nephews attempting to take power.

In 116 BC, Liu Pengli's sovereignty was abolished and his land was reclaimed by Emperor Jing.

== See also ==
- List of serial killers in China
