= Twelve Provinces =

Ancient Chinese historical term

- Chinese: 十二州
Transcriptions
Standard Mandarin
- Hanyu Pinyin: Shí Èr Zhōu

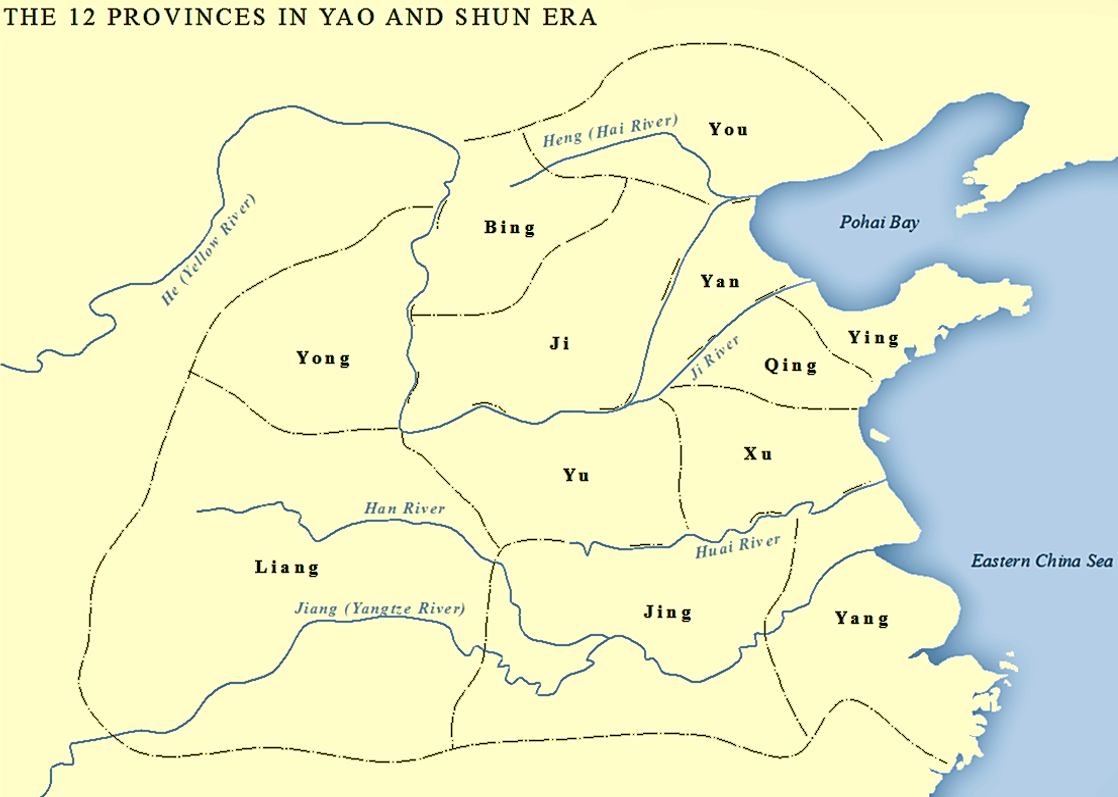
The map of 12 Provinces of Yao and Shun era of ancient China, recorded in the "Shiji" (Records of Grand Historian)

The Twelve Provinces is a term used in ancient Chinese histories to refer to territorial divisions during the reigns of the mythological emperors Yao and Shun of the Three Sovereigns and Five Emperors.

== Records in histories ==
The "Annals of the Five Emperors" (五帝本紀) section of Records of the Grand Historian mentioned:

Shun felt that the land north of Ji Province was too wide, so he created Bing Province; Yan and Qi were too vast and distant, so he formed You Province out of Yan, and Ying Province out of Qi, hence there were the Twelve Provinces.

Volume 85 of the Book of Han recorded that in 30 BC Gu Yong (谷永) mentioned:

There was a great flood in Yao's time, the land was divided into the Twelve Provinces...

Yan Shigu of the Tang dynasty wrote this annotation in volume 85 of the Book of Han:

The Twelve Provinces were Ji, Yan, Yu, Qing, Xu, Jing, Yang, Yong, Liang, You, Bing, and Ying (營).

== See also ==
- Nine Provinces
- Eighteen Provinces
