= Daliang =

Daliang may refer to:

- Daliang (大梁), the capital of Wei (state), located near modern Kaifeng, Henan, China
  - Daliang, a former name of Kaifeng
- Daliang Mountains, a mountain range in southwest China between Sichuan and Yunnan
- Daliang Subdistrict, in Shunde District, Foshan, Guangdong, China
- Daliang Township (大两乡), a township in Wangcang County, Sichuan, China
- Daliang, Guangxi (大良), a town in Rong'an County, Guangxi, China
- Daliang, Tianjin (大良), a town in Wuqing District, Tianjin, China

== See also ==
- Liang dynasty (disambiguation) - many of these states were also known as Daliang ("Great Liang")
- Liang (disambiguation)
- Dalian, a city in Liaoning, China
