= Later Liang =

Later Liang may refer to the following states in Chinese history:

- Later Liang (Sixteen Kingdoms) (後涼; 386–403), one of the Sixteen Kingdoms
- Western Liang (555–587), also known as Later Liang (後梁), a state during the Southern and Northern Dynasties period
- Later Liang (Five Dynasties) (後梁; 907–923), a state during the Five Dynasties and Ten Kingdoms period

== See also ==
- Emperor Taizu of Later Liang (disambiguation)
- Liang dynasty (disambiguation)
- Western Liang (disambiguation)
- Southern Liang (disambiguation)
