= Western Liang =

Western Liang may refer to the following states and territories in imperial China:

- Western Liang (Sixteen Kingdoms) (西涼) (400–421), one of the Sixteen Kingdoms located in modern Western China
- Western Liang (555–587) (西梁), a state during the Southern and Northern Dynasties period, located in modern Central China
- Liang Province in northwestern China

== See also ==
- Liang dynasty (disambiguation)
- Later Liang (disambiguation)
- Southern Liang (disambiguation)
