= Liang (realm) =

Liang (Chinese: 梁) was a traditional Chinese fief centered on present-day Kaifeng. It was held by various powers over the course of Chinese history. It generally comprised modern Henan with a small part of Shanxi.

== Ancient China ==
Liang (sometimes as 梁州, Liángzhōu) was one of the Nine Provinces of ancient China originally recorded in the Yu Gong or Tribute of Yu section of the Book of Documents. By the time of the Erya, it had been replaced among the list of the nine major provinces of China. Nevertheless, it was usually included among the lists of the Twelve Provinces in the reigns of the mythological figures of Emperor Yao and Emperor Shun. It included the upper Han River basin west of the Huaxia homeland.

== State of Liang ==
The counts of Liang (梁伯, Liángbó) possessed the surname Ying (嬴). Their capital was located south of Hancheng in Shaanxi. During the 8th and 7th centuries BC, they were involved in various alliances against the hegemony of Jin. In 642 BC, the count constructed a new capital for his realm only to have it seized by Qin upon its completion. The State of Liang collapsed from internal problems in 641 BC, and Duke Mu of Qin annexed the area completely.

== Wei Kingdom ==
The kings of Liang (梁王, Liángwáng) were the lords of Wei. Descending from the Bi (畢) branch of the Ji (姬), the Zhou royal family, they came to be known as the Wei family (魏) after Bi Wan conquered that land for Jin. In 344 BC, they were forced to move the capital from Anyi to Daliang (lit. "Greater Liang", now Kaifeng) to escape attacks from Qin. In 344 BC, Marquess Hui declared himself independent of the Zhou and styled himself "King of Liang". His successors carried on the title until Liang's conquest by Qin in 225 BC but are generally known as the "Kings of Wei" today.

- Wei Ying, King Hui (r. 344–319 BC)
- Wei Si or He, King Xiang (r. 319–296 BC), son of King Hui
- Wei Chi, King Zhao (296–277 BC), son of King Xiang
- Wei Yu, King Anxi (277–243 BC), son of King Zhao
- Wei Zeng or Wu, King Jingmin (243–228 BC ), son of King Anxi
- Wei Jia, King Jia (228–225 BC), son of King Jingmin

== Han Principality ==
The princes of Liang (梁王) bore the same title in Chinese as the Wei kings but are generally translated differently into English to reflect their changed status following the creation of the title of emperor of China by Shi Huangdi. Their capital was generally at Suiyang in present-day Henan.

The Qin Empire was a unitary state following legalist policies but, upon establishing its Han successor, Liu Bang reïnstituted the previous fiefs and granted high titles to relatives and allies. In 202 BC, he created his general Peng Yue the first prince of Liang. Within five years, however, Peng was arrested on false charges of treason and executed. His title was then given to the emperor's son Liu Hui. As Liang was a rich and important patch of territory, its princes were powerful and prominent: many met with untimely deaths either because they began to covet the imperial throne or because they were feared to do so. A famous example apart from Peng Yue was Emperor Jing's younger brother Liu Wu, whose minions executed ten of the emperor's ministers for standing in his way. After the death of Liu Wu in 144 BC, his realm was divided among his five sons. Liu Pengli, the prince of Jidong, became a notorious serial killer and had his lands confiscated by Emperor Jing.

- Peng Yue (r. 202–197 BC), a Han general
- Liu Hui (r. 196–181 BC), son of Emperor Gao
- Liu Yi, Prince Huai (r. 178–169 BC), 2nd son of Emperor Wen
- Liu Wu, Prince Xiao (r. 168–144 BC), 3rd son of Emperor Wen
- Liu Mai, Prince Gong (r. 144–137 BC), 1st son of Liu Wu
- Liu Xiang, Prince Ping (r. 137–97 BC), son of Liu Mai

== Liang Empire ==
The Liang Empire was established by the Southern Qi general Xiao Yan in AD 502. It was named for the titles duke of Liang (梁公, Liánggōng) and prince of Liang (梁王) which Xiao had the Empress An bestow upon him in her position as regent for the teenage Emperor He. Despite the title, his capital and court were at Jiankang (within modern Nanjing).

== Sui Kingdom ==
A new and independent kingdom of Liang (梁王) was declared in 619 by Shen Faxing, a Sui general in the lower Yangtze. Despite the name, his capital was at Piling (modern Changzhou) and he only ever controlled areas of present-day Zhejiang and Jiangsu before his territory was conquered by the agrarian rebel Li Zitong (under the title Emperor of Wu).

== Tang Principality ==
The title of prince of Liang (梁王) was revived in AD 690 under the empress dowager Wu Zetian's new Zhou dynasty in order to honor her half-nephew Wu Sansi. He was demoted to a lesser principality after her death in 705 but restored as prince of Liang posthumously two years later.

== Later Liang (907-923) ==
Later Liang was a state during the Five Dynasties and Ten Kingdoms period. It was founded by Zhu Wen, after he forced the last emperor of the Tang dynasty to abdicate in his favour. The Later Liang would last until 923 when it was destroyed by the Later Tang dynasty.

== Yuan Principality ==
The title of prince of Liang (梁王) was revived a fourth time under the Yuan dynasty as a hereditary appanage for one of the sons of Kublai Khan. The Princes of Liang served as the Yuan viceroys of Yunnan. By far the most famous was Basalawarmi (d. 1382), who continued his family's fight against the Ming long after the fall of Khanbalik in 1368.
