= Yangju Nang clan =

Korean clan from Jiangsu, China

- Country: Korea
- Current region: Yang Province
- Founder: Nang Cho

Yangju Nang clan (Korean: 양주 낭씨; Hanja: 楊州 浪氏) is one of the Korean clans. Their Bon-gwan is in Yang Province, Jiangsu, China. According to research held in 2000, the number of Yangju Nang clan's member was 334. Their founder was Nang Cho who was from Yang Province, Jiangsu and worked as the deputy minister of defense (兵部侍郎, Bingbu Shilang) in Ming dynasty during Chongzhen's reign. He was naturalized in Joseon between 1628 and 1644. According to Angyeopgi's record, he a descendant of surrender in Jurchen people.

== See also ==
- Korean clan names of foreign origin
