= Yu Province =

Yu Province may refer to the following ancient Chinese provinces:

- Yuzhou (ancient China), an ancient Chinese province
- Yuchow/Yu Province, the Chinese Postal Map Romanisation spelling for the ancient Chinese province of Youzhou
- Yu (豫) is the short name for modern Henan province
