= Nanliang =

Nanliang may refer to:

- Nanliang, Shanxi, a town in Yicheng County, Shanxi, China

== Chinese dynasties ==
- Southern Liang (Sixteen Kingdoms) (397–414; 南涼), one of the Sixteen Kingdoms, in present-day Northwest China
- Liang dynasty (502–557), also known as Southern Liang (南梁), one of the southern dynasties during the Northern and Southern Dynasties period, mainly in present-day South China

== See also ==
- Liang dynasty (disambiguation)
- Later Liang (disambiguation)
- Western Liang (disambiguation)
