= Taizu of Liang =

Taizu of Liang may refer to:

- Zhang Gui (255–314), Governor of Liang during the Jin dynasty, sometimes known as Taizu of Former Liang
- Lü Guang (337–400) of Later Liang during the Sixteen Kingdoms
- Li Gao (351–417) of Western Liang during the Sixteen Kingdoms
- Juqu Mengxun (368–433) of Northern Liang during the Sixteen Kingdoms
- Xiao Shunzhi (fl. 477–482), whose son Emperor Wu of Liang posthumously honored him as Emperor Taizu of Liang
- Zhu Wen (852–912) of Later Liang during the Five Dynasties and Ten Kingdoms period

== See also ==
- Taizu (disambiguation)
- Liang (disambiguation)
