= Nine Provinces =

Territorial division during the Xia and Shang dynasties

Nine Provinces recorded in Yu Gong

The term Nine Provinces or Nine Regions (Chinese: 九州; pinyin: Jiǔ Zhōu), is used in ancient Chinese histories to refer to territorial divisions or islands during the Xia and Shang dynasties and has now come to symbolically represent China. "Province" is the word used to translate zhou (州) – since before the Tang dynasty (618–907 CE), it was the largest Chinese territorial division. Although the current definition of the Nine Provinces can be dated to the Spring and Autumn and Warring States periods, it was not until the Eastern Han dynasty that the Nine Provinces were treated as actual administrative regions.

== Different interpretations of the Nine Provinces ==
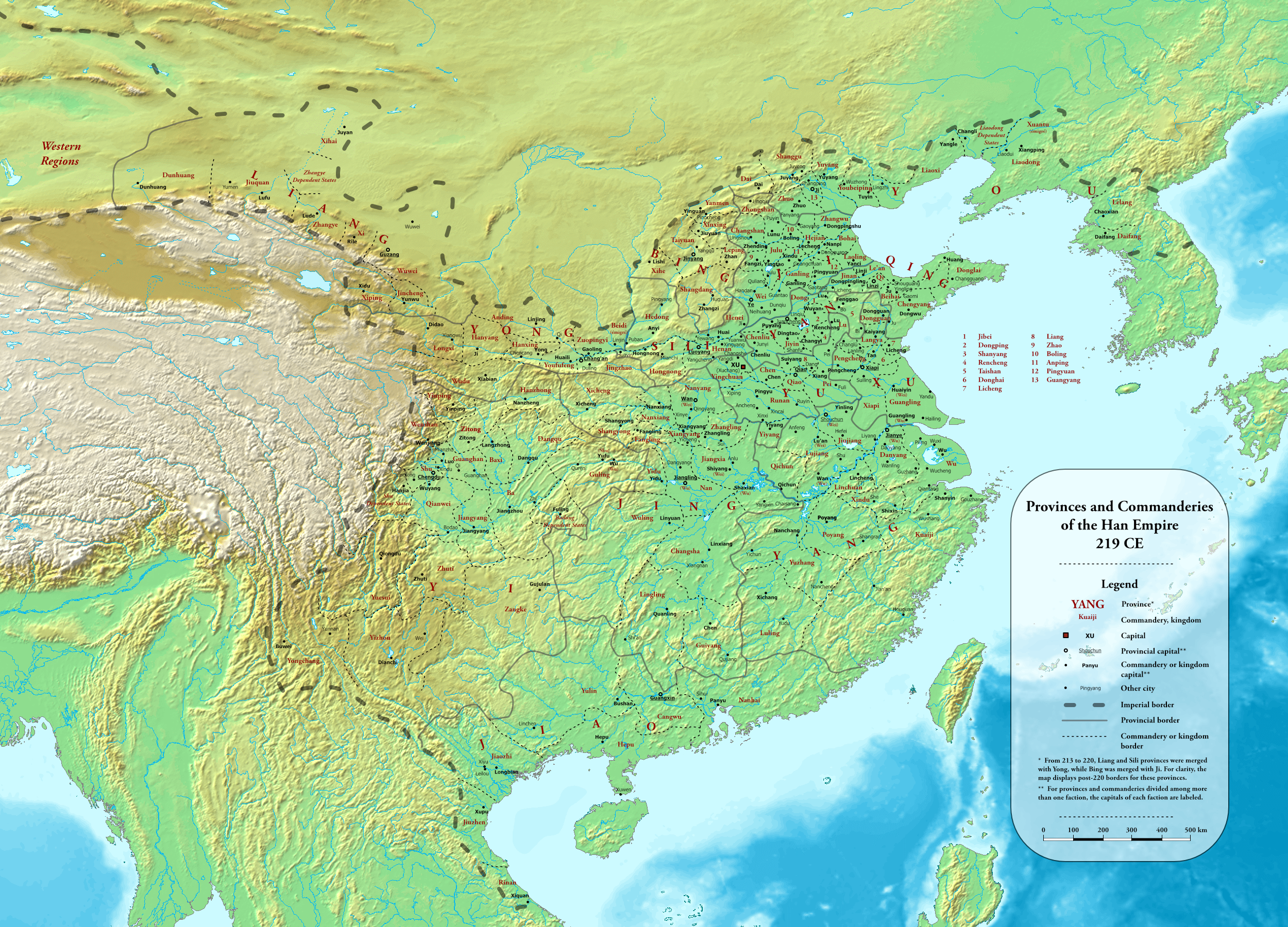
Map of the Han dynasty in 219, with the Nine Provinces marked

The Rongcheng Shi bamboo slips from the Chu state has the earliest interpretation of the Nine Provinces, but these early descriptions differ widely from the currently recognized Nine Provinces. The Nine Provinces, according to the Rongcheng Shi, are Tu (涂), Jia (夾), Zhang (竞), Ju (莒), Ou (藕), Jing (荊), Yang (陽), Xu (敘) and Cuo (虘).

The most prevalent account of the Nine Provinces comes from the Yu Gong or Tribute of Yu section of the Book of Xia (夏書), collected in the Book of Documents. It was therein recorded that Yu the Great divided the world into the nine provinces of Ji (冀), Yan (兗), Qing (青), Xu (徐), Yang (揚), Jing (荊), Yu (豫), Liang (梁) and Yong (雍). The geography section (釋地) of the ancient Erya encyclopedia also cites nine provinces, but with You and Ying (營) listed instead of Qing and Liang. In the "Clan Responsibilities" (職方氏) section of Rituals of Zhou, the provinces include You and Bing but not Xu and Liang. The Lüshi Chunqiu "Initial Survey" (有始覽) section mentions You but not Liang.

Traditionally, the Book of Documents is thought to depict the divisions during the Xia dynasty, the Erya those of the Shang dynasty; the Rituals of Zhou the Zhou dynasty and the Lüshi Chunqiu the concept and actual territorial distribution of the Nine Provinces during the Spring and Autumn and Warring States periods. The Lüshi Chunqiu contains the following passage on the location of the nine provinces and their general correspondence with the states of the time:

Yu province, i.e., Zhou, lies between the He River and Han River. Jin in Ji Province is between the two rivers. Yan Province is between the He River and Ji River, and is Wei. Qing Province, ie. Qi is in the east. Lu is at Xu Province, on the Si River. Yang Province, or Yue, is to the southwest. Jing Province is in the south and forms Chu. Yong Province, that is Qin, is to the west. Yan occupies You Province in the north.

The words "Nine Provinces" do not appear in any ancient oracle bone inscriptions, such that many scholars do not think Yu the Great created the Nine Provinces as was traditionally thought. Some suggest the name "Jiuzhou", which came to mean "Nine Provinces", was actually a place, or the divisions were within Shandong.

Later on, Zou Yan, an adherent of the Taoist Yin and Yang School (陰陽家), proposed a new theory of the "Greater Nine Provinces" (大九州). According to him, the nine provinces in the Book of Documents were only "minor" provinces, which combined to form the "Red County / Divine Province" (赤縣神州), i.e. China (cf. Shenzhou). Nine such provinces then form another "medium" nine provinces surrounded by a sea. There are nine such medium provinces, which were surrounded by a Great Ocean, forming the Greater Nine Provinces. The Nine Provinces' names in the "Geographical Instruction" section (地形訓) of Huainanzi, annotations to Zhang Heng's biography (張衡傳注) in Book of the Later Han and volume eight of the Chuxue Annals (初學記), are different from the traditional ones listed above. They all include Shenzhou, which led some scholars to suggest they are the names of the Greater Nine Provinces. According to the "Forms of Earth" (墜形訓) section of the Huainanzi, outside the Greater Nine Provinces are the Eight Yin (八殥), the Eight Hong (八紘) and the Eight Ji (八極). According to the Genealogical Descent of the Emperors (帝王世紀), rulers before Shennong had influence over the Greater Nine Provinces, but those from the Yellow Emperor onwards did not extend their virtue that far. The Greater Nine Provinces theory was based on the knowledge in the states of Yan and Qi on the Yellow Sea coast that China comprised only 1/81 of the entire world, markedly different from the Sinocentric point of view that was prevalent at the time. Geographic knowledge from increasing contact between the Han dynasty (206 BCE – 220 CE) and its neighbours proved the theory false and it lost popularity.

By the time of the Three Kingdoms period (220–280 CE) the Nine Provinces had expanded into thirteen provinces together with a central administrative region.

== See also ==
- Eighteen Provinces
- Four Seas
- Huaxia
- Nine Tripod Cauldrons
- Shan Hai Jing
- Tianxia
- Luoshu Square
- Twelve Provinces
