= Yuan Ang =

Han dynasty politician (died 148 BCE)

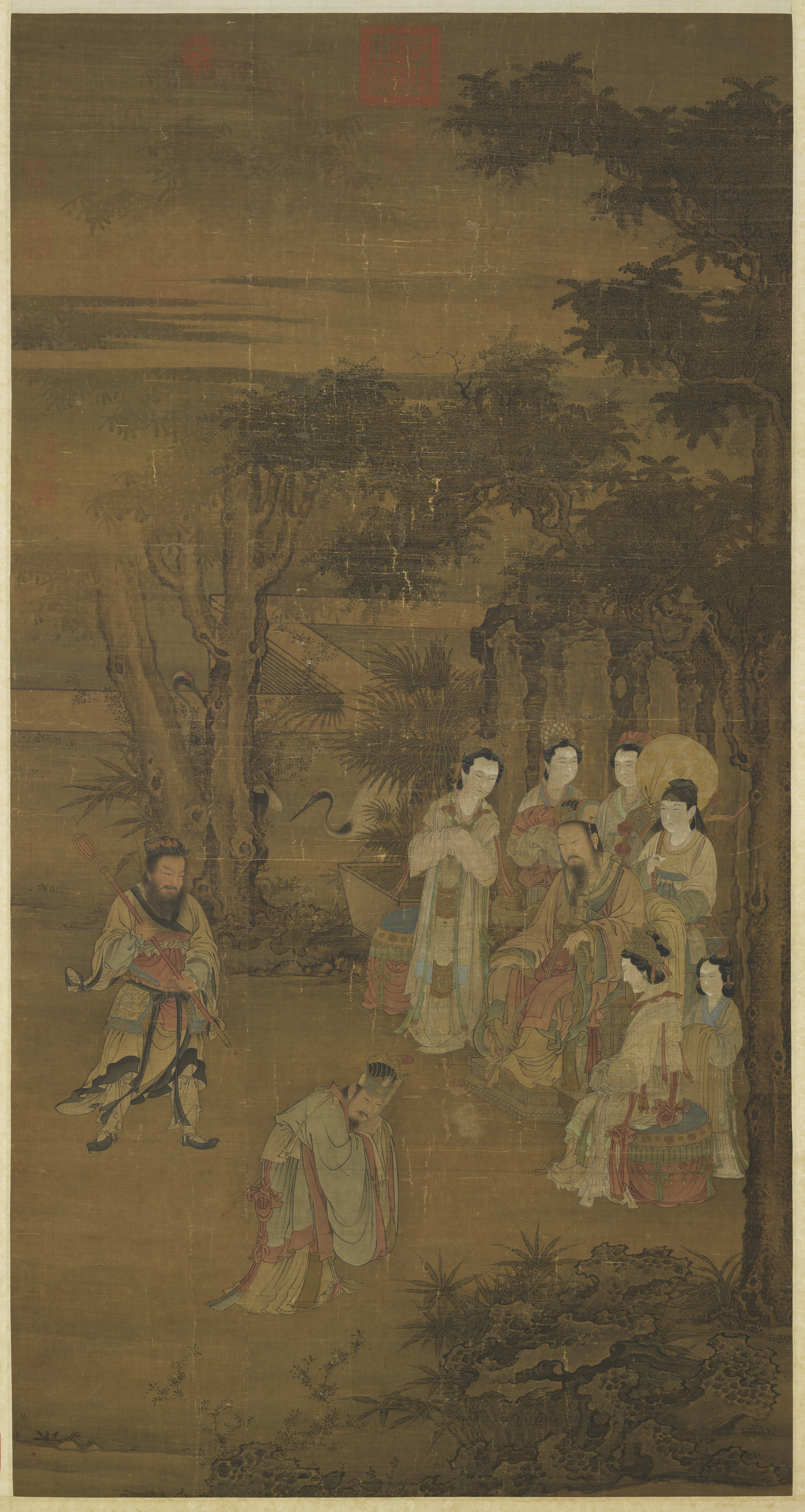
Yuan Ang remonstrating Emperor Wen of Han, as depicted in Refusing the Seat (卻坐圖) by an unknown painter of the Song dynasty

Yuan Ang (Chinese: 袁盎; pinyin: Yuán Àng; died 148 BC), courtesy name Si (丝), was an official of the Chinese Western Han dynasty during the reigns of Emperor Wen and Emperor Jing. His biography appears in the Records of the Grand Historian and a parallel one is included in the Book of Han. During the Rebellion of the Seven States, he had advised Emperor Jing to execute Chao Cuo, with whom he was at loggerheads with.

He was assassinated in 148 BC when his suggestions irritated Emperor Jing's powerful brother Liu Wu (Prince Xiao of Liang), by assassins sent by Liu Wu. Yuan had advised against making Liu Wu the successor of Emperor Jing.

== Story about Yuan Ang ==
Yuan Ang was a minister under Emperor Wen of the Han dynasty. He was honest and outspoken, but was often vilified by the eunuch Zhao Tan who, thanks to his knowledge of astrology, had found favor with the emperor. Yuan Ang was upset.

"You need to humiliate the eunuch in public," his nephew suggested. "Then the emperor will stop listening to his slanders."

One day the emperor was going out and the eunuch Zhao Tan was seated by his side in the royal carriage. Yuan Ang came across them at the gate of the palace.

"It's a great honor to ride with Your Majesty," he said. "Only those who have outstanding merits and abilities should be given such honor. But we don't have many such people. I wonder why Your Majesty allows a eunuch to sit by your side."

Emperor Wen chuckled and ordered Eunuch Zhao Tan to get off his carriage. The latter was so humiliated, he was on the edge of tears. Since then, no matter how he bad-mouthed Yuan Ang, the emperor turned a deaf ear to his words.
