= Wang Liang =

Wang Liang may refer to:

- Wangliang, a demon in Chinese mythology
- Wang Liang (footballer, born 1979), Chinese footballer
- Wang Liang (footballer, born 1989), Chinese footballer
- Liang Wang (oboist) (born 1980), Chinese-American oboist
- Wang Liang, a legendary Chinese charioteer and a Chinese constellation named after him (see Beta Cassiopeiae)

== See also ==
- Liang Wang (disambiguation)
