= Yuzhou (ancient China) =

Historic administrative division of China

- Chinese: 豫州
Transcriptions
Standard Mandarin
- Hanyu Pinyin: Yùzhōu

Yuzhou or Yu Province was one of the Nine Provinces of ancient China, later to become an administrative division around the reign of Emperor Wu (r. 141 BC - 87 BC) of the Western Han dynasty (206 BC-AD 9).

== History ==
=== Pre-Qin dynasty ===
Pre-Qin dynasty (221 BC–206 BC) historical texts such as the Yu Gong or Tribute of Yu chapter of the Book of History, Erya, Rites of Zhou and Lüshi Chunqiu all refer to the Nine Provinces. Yuzhou appears in all of these texts even though different names are provided for the Nine Provinces. The Rites of Zhou states that Yuzhou was Henan Province, while the Lüshi Chunqiu records: "Yuzhou was between the Yellow and Han rivers. That was where Zhou was located."

=== Han dynasty ===
In 106 BC during the reign of Emperor Wu of the Western Han dynasty (206 BC-AD 9), China was divided into thirteen administrative divisions (excluding the area under the central government's control), each governed by an Inspector (刺史). Yuzhou was one of the thirteen. The areas it governed included: north of the Huai River, east of the Ru River basin, and Feng and Pei counties in Jiangsu. However Yuzhou did not have a provincial capital and was only an administrative division in name.

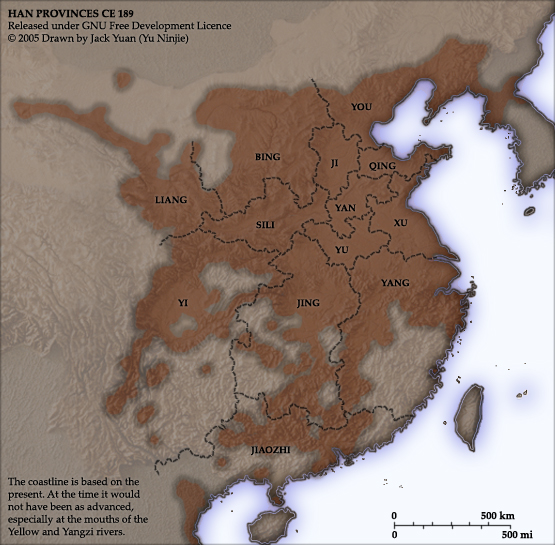
Map of Chinese provinces in the prelude of Three Kingdoms period (In the late Han dynasty period, 189 CE).

In 188 during the reign of Emperor Ling of the Eastern Han dynasty (25-220), Yuzhou's capital was established in Qiao County (譙縣; present-day Bozhou, Anhui). The area under Yuzhou's jurisdiction included parts of eastern Henan, western Anhui. It was in charge of two commanderies - Yingchuan (潁川) and Runan (汝南) - and four states - Liang (梁), Pei (沛), Chen (陳) and Lu (魯).

=== Three Kingdoms ===
During the Three Kingdoms period (220-280), Yuzhou was in the state of Cao Wei (220–265) and its capital was designated in Ancheng County (northeast of present-day Zhengyang County, Henan, on the southwestern bank of the south Ru River). Under its jurisdiction were nine commanderies - Yingchuan (潁川), Chen (陳), Lu (魯), Runan (汝南), Qiao (譙), Yiyang (弋陽), Yang'an (陽安), Xiangcheng (襄城) and Ruyin (汝陰) - and two states - Liang (梁) and Pei (沛).

=== Jin dynasty and Sixteen Kingdoms ===
During the Western Jin dynasty (266-316), Yuzhou's capital was in Chen County (陳縣; present-day Huaiyang County, Henan), and it governed ten commanderies and states.

Its capital constantly changed during the Eastern Jin dynasty (317-420) and its boundaries were not fixed. Yuzhou controlled the Huai River delta and parts of Anhui and Jiangsu along the Yangtze River when its land area was greatest during Eastern Jin. In 329 Yuzhou's capital was set up in Wuyang County (蕪湖縣; east of present-day Wuyang, Anhui). After 338 the capital kept changing, and its locations included: Zhucheng (邾城; northwest of present-day Huanggang, Hubei); Wuhu (蕪湖); Niuzhu (牛渚; present-day Caishi Subdistrict, Ma'anshan, Anhui); Liyang (歷陽; present-day He County, Anhui); Matou (馬頭; southern bank of the Huai River at south of Huaiyuan County, Anhui); Qiao (譙; present-day Bozhou, Anhui); Gushu (姑孰; present-day Dangtu County, Anhui). From 416 onwards its capital was in Shouchun (壽春; present-day Shou County, Anhui).

During the Sixteen Kingdoms period (304-439), Yuzhou was under Later Zhao, and its capital was moved to Xuchang County (許昌縣; east of present-day Xuchang, Henan). The Former Qin kingdom later renamed it Dongyuzhou (東豫州; Eastern Yu Province) and designated its capital in Luoyang County (洛陽縣; northeast of present-day Luoyang, Henan).

=== Southern and Northern Dynasties ===
During the Southern and Northern dynasties period (420-589), China was further divided into many administrative divisions so the land area in each division was reduced. Yuzhou fell under the control of several dynasties and experienced a series of renaming and changes to its capital.

- The Liu Song dynasty (420-479) established a Nanyuzhou (南豫州; Southern Yu Province) with its capital in Gure (姑熟; present-day Dangtu County, Anhui).
- The Southern Qi (479-502) set up another Yuzhou in addition to Nanyuzhou, with the former's capital in Shouchun (壽春; present-day Shou County, Anhui).
- In 500 Yuzhou fell under Northern Wei (386-535) control and was renamed Yangzhou (揚州). It was later renamed to Luozhou (洛州), and Sizhou ({{lang|zh|司州) was renamed Yuzhou, with the latter's capital in Shangcai County (上蔡縣; present-day Runan County, Henan).
- In 506 the Liang dynasty (502-557) set up Yuzhou's capital in Hefei (合肥; present-day Hefei, Anhui). In 526 it was renamed Nanyuzhou. Towards the end of the Liang dynasty its capital was moved to Huaining (懷寧; present-day Qianshan County, Anhui). In 550 it was renamed to Jinzhou (晉州) with its capital in Nanchang (南昌; present-day Nanchang, Jiangxi). In 557 it was renamed Jiangzhou (江州).
- In 550 Yuzhou came under Eastern Wei (534-550) and was renamed back to Yangzhou.
- In 573 Yuzhou came under the Chen dynasty (557-589) and was renamed back to Yuzhou.
- In 579 Northern Zhou (557–581) renamed Yuzhou to Yangzhou (揚州), and later to Shuzhou (舒州) and Zhenzhou (溱州).

=== Sui and Tang dynasties ===
During the early Daye era (605-618) of the Sui dynasty (589–618), Yuzhou was renamed Caizhou (蔡州) and its capital designated in Luoyang (洛陽; present-day Luoyang, Henan). In 607 it was renamed to Henan Commandery (河南郡).

Yuzhou was restored in the early Tang dynasty (618–907) and its capital set up in Ruyang County (汝陽縣; present-day Runan County, Henan). In 742 it was renamed Runan Commandery (汝南郡), and in 758 it was renamed back to Yuzhou. Around 762 and 763 it was renamed to Caizhou (蔡州) again.

=== Liao dynasty ===
During the Khitan-led Liao dynasty (907–1125), Yuzhou was under the control of the Prince of Chen (陳王) lineage. It was established as a military division of the capital Shangjing (上京; present-day Baarin Left Banner, Inner Mongolia). Its capital was near northwest of present-day Jarud Banner, Inner Mongolia.

=== Jin dynasty ===
Yuzhou was abolished during the Jurchen-ruled Jin dynasty (1115–1234).
