= Liu Bushi =

Liu Bushi (Chinese: 劉不識, Liú Bùshí), Prince of Jiyin (濟陰王, Jì Yīnwàng), was a prince of the Han dynasty. He was the youngest son and heir of Liu Wu, prince of Liang. He did not receive all of his father's inheritance; instead, his uncle the emperor Jing divided the Liang Kingdom into five pieces. Liu Bushi ruled Jiyin from 144–143 BC.
