= Yu Gong =

Chapter of the Book of Documents

- Conjectural map of the Nine Provinces
- Traditional Chinese: 禹貢
- Simplified Chinese: 禹贡
- Literal meaning: Tribute of Yu
Transcriptions
Standard Mandarin
- Hanyu Pinyin: Yǔ Gòng; Yǔgòng
- Wade–Giles: Yü Kung; Yü-kung

The Yu Gong or Tribute of Yu is a chapter of the Book of Xia (Chinese: t 夏書, s 夏书, Xià Shū) section of the Book of Documents, one of the Five Classics of ancient Chinese literature. The chapter describes the legendary Yu the Great and the provinces of his time. Most modern scholars believe it was written in the fifth century BCE or later.

== Contents and significance ==
The chapter can be divided into two parts. The first describes the nine provinces of Ji (冀), Yan (兗), Qing (青), Xu (徐), Yang (揚), Jing (荊), Yu (豫), Liang (梁), and Yong (雍), with the improvement works conducted by Yu in each province. The second enumerates Yu's surveys of the rivers of the empire, followed by an idealized description of five concentric domains of five hundred li each, from the royal domain (甸服 Diānfú) around the capital to the remote wild domain (荒服 Huāngfú). Later, this would become important in the justification for the concept of Tianxia or "All Under Heaven" as a means to back up the territorial and other claims of successive Chinese dynasties.

== Origin and versions ==
Although the Yu Gong is traditionally dated to the Xia dynasty (c. 2070 – c. 1600 BCE), most modern scholars agree that the work is considerably more recent. Tradition dictates that Confucius (551–479 BCE) compiled the Book of Documents and included the Yu Gong, although it is more likely that this was done later. Wang Guowei suggested in his "New Confirmation of Ancient History" (古史新证) that the Yu Gong was written at the start of the Zhou dynasty, but most scholars now agree with the view of Gu Jiegang that it is a product of the Warring States, Qin or Early Han periods.

References to maritime history in the Analects of Confucius and the Yu Gong suggest their origin in a single culture while the appearance of the West River (西河) and South River (南河) in the latter indicate that the author came from the State of Wei. In the preface to his Commentary on the Yu Gong Map (禹贡图注), Ming dynasty Scholar Ài Nányīng (艾南英) (1583–1646) considered the Yu Gong the "progenitor of all geographic texts both ancient and contemporary."
