= Yangzhou (ancient China) =

Ancient Chinese territory

- Traditional Chinese: 揚州
- Simplified Chinese: 扬州
Transcriptions
Standard Mandarin
- Hanyu Pinyin: Yángzhōu

Yangzhou, Yangchow or Yang Province was one of the Nine Provinces of ancient China mentioned in historical texts such as the Tribute of Yu, Erya and Rites of Zhou.

== Name ==
There are four different theories regarding the origin of the name "Yangzhou":

- Yangzhou's etymological root is related to trees. The Chunqiu Yuan Ming Bao recorded, "The soil is damp and moist, poplars and willows thrive there, that is how the name originated." Shen Kuo (1031–1095) wrote that "Yangzhou is suitable for poplars (楊; yang) and Jingzhou is suitable for brambles (荊; jing)." Li Dou (fl. 18th century) wrote that "Yangzhou is suitable for poplars (楊; yang) and those growing on dykes are even larger. There is one (poplar tree) every five steps and two every ten steps, in pairs and threes they stand in gardens." Yangzhou is also sometimes written in Chinese as 楊州 instead of 揚州; 楊 means "poplar".
- The origin of the name "Yangzhou" has something to do with water. The Chinese dictionary Shiming, which dates back to the Eastern Han dynasty (AD 25–220), states, "There are waters everywhere on Yangzhou's borders, the waters form waves." A commentary to the Classic of Poetry states, "Yang (揚; lit. "rise / scatter"), like the Chinese character for it, gives people an arousing sensation."
- The name "Yangzhou" derives from climate and human nature. Guo Pu (276–324) mentioned that the Jiangnan region had a warm and wet climate, its vegetation was dense and there were flowing waters in rivers and lakes, which gave people a feeling that the area was full of vigour and life, therefore it was called Yangzhou.
- "Yangzhou" originated from "Yue" (越; a term for the area in southeastern China around modern Zhejiang province). Sun Yirang (1848–1908) wrote, "This land was inhabited by the Baiyue. "Yang" (揚) and "Yue" (越) have the same meaning, so Yangzhou could have gotten its name from "Yangyue", just as "Jingzhou" and "Jingchu" have the same meaning."

Before the Sui dynasty conquered the Chen dynasty in 589, the Chinese terms 揚州 and 楊州 were used interchangeably when referring to "Yangzhou".

== Geographical location ==
According to legend, when Yu the Great (c. 2200–2100 BC) tamed the flood, he divided the land of China into the Nine Provinces, of which Yangzhou was one. Pre-Qin dynasty (221–206 BC) historical texts such as the Tribute of Yu, Erya, Rites of Zhou and Lüshi Chunqiu all mention the Nine Provinces. Yangzhou appears in all these texts even though they provide different names for the Nine Provinces. However, there are three different accounts of the geographical location of Yangzhou.

=== Tribute of Yu account ===
The Tribute of Yu records that Yangzhou was located between Huai and the Sea. Kong Anguo (fl. 2nd century BC) explained in Shangshu Zhuan (尚書傳) that the text meant that Yangzhou was bordered by the Huai River in the north and the South China Sea in the south. In modern China, the area covered by the ancient Yangzhou corresponds to Jiangsu, Anhui (the region south of the Huai River), Shanghai, Zhejiang, Fujian, Jiangxi, and parts of Hubei, Hunan and Guangdong. The modern city of Yangzhou in Jiangsu is within the ancient Yangzhou's boundaries. However, in later dynasties, the Shangshu Zhuan was proven to be not written by Kong Anguo, hence the book's credibility was largely reduced.

=== Erya account ===
The ancient Chinese encyclopaedia Erya states that Jiangnan was Yangzhou, with the "jiang" (lit. "river") referring to the Yangtze River. Guo Pu (276–324) mentioned in his annotations to the Erya that Yangzhou was defined as the region between south of the Yangtze to the Sea. This area in modern China covers roughly parts of Jiangsu and Anhui that are located south of the Yangtze, as well as Shanghai, Zhejiang, Fujian, and parts of Jiangxi and Guangdong. However, the modern city of Yangzhou in Jiangsu is not within these boundaries, because it is situated north of the Yangtze. Xing Bing (邢昺; 931–1010) wrote in Erya Shu (爾雅疏; Sub-commentary to the Erya) that Jiangnan was a large portion of the ancient Yangzhou, and the lands covered by the ancient Yangzhou was not only limited to Jiangnan. Going by this account, the modern city of Yangzhou was therefore within the ancient Yangzhou. However, as Xing Bing's Erya Shu makes references to Kong Anguo's Shangshu Zhuan, which was verified to be not written by Kong, the Erya Shu's credibility is also disputed.

=== Rites of Zhou and Lüshi Chunqiu accounts ===
The Rites of Zhou records, "The southeast is called Yangzhou." By this saying, the ancient Yangzhou would then cover the entire southeastern China, an area larger than the Yangzhou defined in the Tribute of Yu and Erya. This definition is even more sketchy than the above two, because it is unclear whether the modern city of Yangzhou in Jiangsu could be within the ancient Yangzhou or not. The accuracy of the Rites of Zhou itself is also in question. The Lüshi Chunqiu similarly mentioned that "the southeast is Yangzhou."

== History ==
=== Han dynasty ===
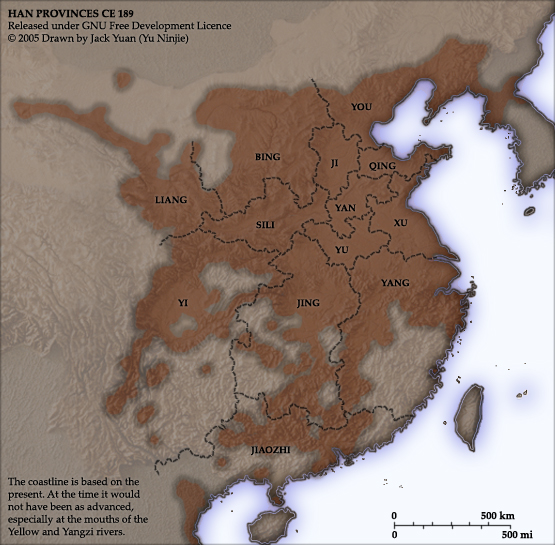
Chinese provinces in the late Eastern Han dynasty period, AD 189.

In 106 BC, during the reign of Emperor Wu (r. 141–87 BC) in the Western Han dynasty (206 BC – AD 9), China was divided into 13 administrative divisions or provinces along with the capital Chang'an and seven commanderies in its vicinity. Each province was governed by a cishi (刺史; Inspector). 11 of them were named after the Nine Provinces mentioned in the historical texts Classic of History and Rites of Zhou. Yangzhou was one of the 11, and it covered parts of modern Anhui (south of the Huai River) and Jiangsu (south of the Yangtze River), as well as Shanghai, Jiangxi, Zhejiang, Fujian, and parts of Hubei and Hunan. The modern city of Yangzhou in Jiangsu was not within the ancient province of Yangzhou; it was in another administrative division called Xuzhou.

Initially, the 13 administrative divisions were known as cishi bu (刺史部; inspectorates) and were not under direct administration by the central government, and did not have any capitals. Instead, commanderies (郡; jun), which were nominally under the jurisdiction of inspectorates, were directly controlled by the central government, hence an Administrator (太守; taishou, an official in charge of a commandery) wielded more power than an Inspector even though the latter held a higher rank. In 8 BC, during the reign of Emperor Cheng (r. 33–7 BC), the post of cishi was replaced by zhoumu (州牧; Governor), and the administrative divisions were officially called zhous (州; provinces), and each had its own capital. The original cishis were renamed zhoucishis (州刺史; Provincial Inspector) to reflect the new changes. Despite so, the provinces were still not under direct administration by the central government.

During the Eastern Han dynasty (AD 25–220), Yangzhou's provincial capital was designated in Liyang (歷陽; present-day He County, Anhui). In 188, after the Yellow Turban Rebellion (184–205) was mostly pacified, Emperor Ling (r. 168–189) promoted many Provincial Inspectors to Governors and granted them autonomy in the administration of civil and military affairs in their respective provinces. This helped to facilitate the Governors in suppressing revolts, but also empowered them with greater authority, as the provinces were now directly administered by the central government.

Towards the end of the Han dynasty, the warlord Cao Cao rose to power and took control of the central government. He moved Yangzhou's capital to Shouchun (壽春; present-day Shou County, Anhui) and later to Hefei (合肥; northwest of present-day Hefei, Anhui). However, most of Yangzhou (south of the Yangtze River) was independent of the Han central government's control, as it was ruled by the warlord Sun Quan. Sun Quan's capital was initially in Wu County, Wu Commandery (around present-day Suzhou, Jiangsu), but was later moved to Jingkou (京口; present-day Zhenjiang, Jiangsu) and eventually to Jianye (present-day Nanjing, Jiangsu). Yangzhou was effectively divided between the domains of the warlords Cao Cao and Sun Quan in the late Eastern Han dynasty, and later between the states of Cao Wei (220–265) and Eastern Wu (229–280) in the Three Kingdoms period (220–280).

=== Three Kingdoms period ===
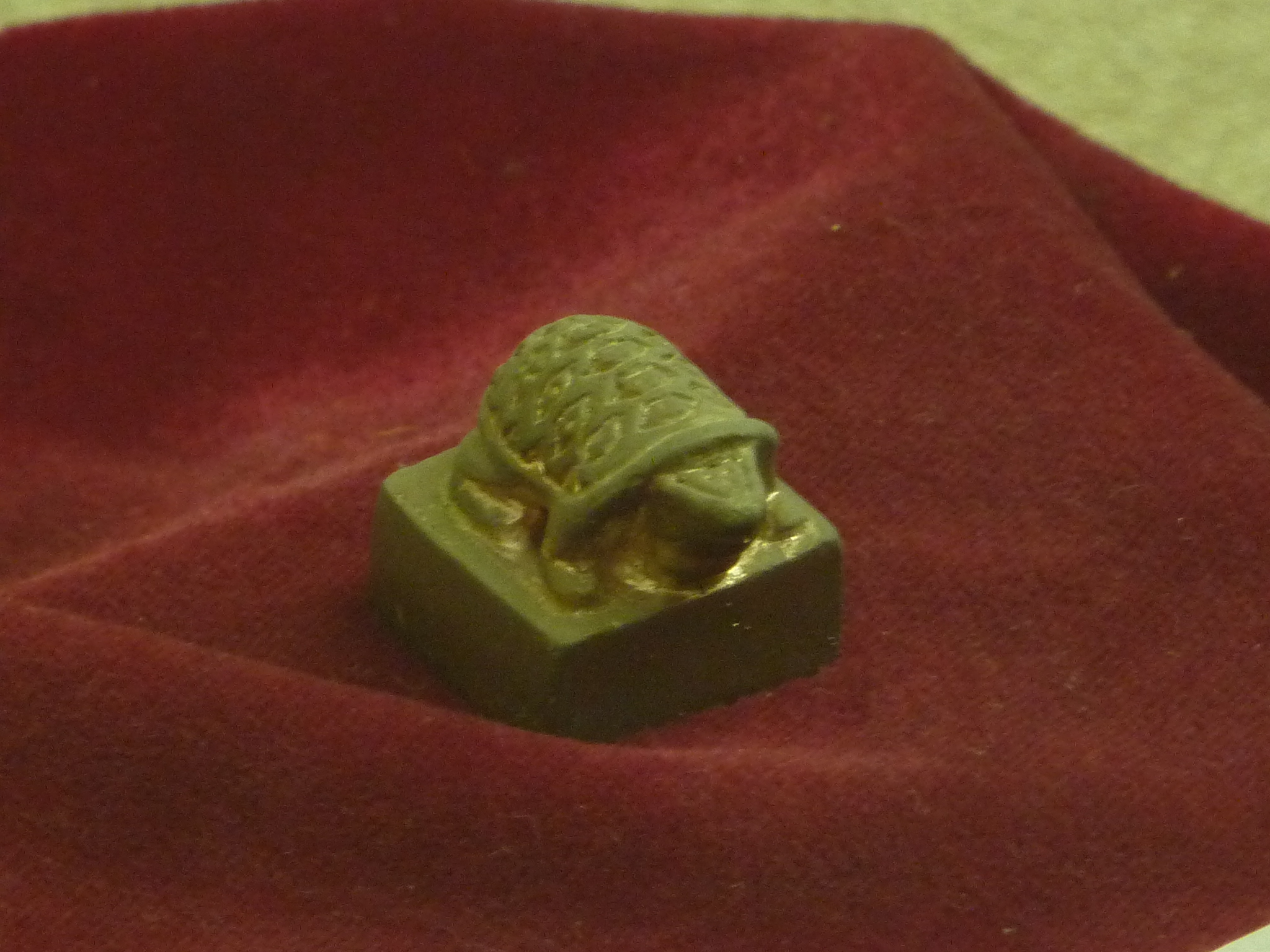
A turtle-shaped gold seal of the Prince of Guangling in the Han dynasty. Excavated in Ganquan Town, Hanjiang District, Yangzhou in 1980, it is now on display in the Han Guangling Royal Tomb Museum in Yangzhou.

In 220, Cao Pi ended the Han dynasty and established the state of Cao Wei, marking the start of the Three Kingdoms period (220–280). A year later, in 221, Liu Bei proclaimed himself emperor of the state of Shu Han. In 222, Sun Quan received the title of "King of Wu" and became a vassal under Cao Wei, but later declared himself emperor of Eastern Wu in 229.

Yangzhou was divided between Wei and Wu: Wei controlled only a small part of Yangzhou and its provincial capital was at Shouchun (壽春; present-day Shou County, Anhui); Wu occupied most of Yangzhou, and its provincial capital, which was also the state capital, was at Jianye (建業; present-day Nanjing, Jiangsu). Yangzhou served as the foundation of Wu, so the situation in the Wu-controlled Yangzhou was rather stable. On the other hand, the Wei-controlled portion of Yangzhou was located at the border between Wei and Wu, with many battles between the two states taking place in that region, including the Three Rebellions in Shouchun (251–258). The modern city of Yangzhou was part of Guangling Commandery (廣陵郡) in Xuzhou (徐州) at the time, with Wei and Wu taking turns to occupy that area throughout the Three Kingdoms period.

=== Jin dynasty, and Southern and Northern Dynasties period ===
In 265, Sima Yan ended the state of Cao Wei and established the Western Jin dynasty (265–316). However, even then, Yangzhou was still divided between Jin and Eastern Wu. In 280, Jin forces invaded Wu's capital Jianye and conquered Wu after the last Wu emperor, Sun Hao, surrendered to Jin. After the fall of Wu, the Jin dynasty reunified Yangzhou and set up its provincial capital at Jianye, which was renamed to "Jianye" (建鄴; same pronunciation as the old name, but written differently in Chinese), and later to "Jiankang" (建康).

When the Yongjia Rebellion broke out in 311, the Jin government moved south to Jiangnan and established the Eastern Jin dynasty (317–420) there, with Jiankang as the state capital. The Eastern Jin government subsequently partitioned Yangzhou into smaller provinces and prefectures such as Jiangzhou (江州), Southern Xuzhou (南徐州) and Eastern Yangzhou (東揚州), thus reducing the size of the original Yangzhou in the Western Jin dynasty. The modern city of Yangzhou remained part of Guangling Commandery and was never part of the historical Yangzhou (Yang Province) throughout the Jin dynasty and the subsequent Southern and Northern Dynasties period (420–589).

=== Sui dynasty ===
In 589, during the reign of Emperor Wen (r. 581–604) in the Sui dynasty (557–589), Sui forces conquered Jiankang (present-day Nanjing, Jiangsu), the capital of the Chen dynasty (557–589) and unified China under Sui rule. The Sui government renamed Yangzhou to "Jiangzhou" (蔣州), and Wuzhou (吳州; capital at present-day Yangzhou, Jiangsu) to "Yangzhou" (揚州). Since then, a link was established between the historical Yangzhou (Yang Province) and the modern city of Yangzhou.

In 605, Emperor Wen's successor, Emperor Yang (r. 604–618), reduced provinces to prefectures (or commanderies). Yangzhou was renamed "Jiangdu Prefecture" (江都郡).

=== Tang dynasty and after ===
In 620, during the reign of Emperor Gaozu (r. 618–626) in the Tang dynasty (618–907), the modern city of Yangzhou was renamed "Yanzhou" (兗州; not to be confused with the modern city of the same name in Shandong) while Jiangning County (江寧縣; present-day Nanjing, Jiangsu) in Runzhou (潤州) was renamed "Yangzhou". Three years later, Yanzhou (兗州) was renamed "Hanzhou" (邗州). Traces of the name "Hanzhou" can still be found in the name of Hanjiang District of the modern Yangzhou city.

After the Xuanwu Gate Incident in 626, Emperor Taizong (r. 626–649) ascended the throne and made the following changes: Yangzhou (the original Jiangning County) was merged into Runzhou (潤州; capital at present-day Zhenjiang, Jiangsu); Hanzhou (邗州) was renamed back to "Yangzhou" (揚州). Only since then was the modern city of Yangzhou officially named "Yangzhou".

In 742, during the reign of Emperor Xuanzong (r. 712–756), provinces were reduced to prefectures again, and Yangzhou was renamed "Guangling Prefecture" (廣陵郡) but it was still commonly referred to as "Yangzhou" even though its official name had been changed. In 760, Emperor Suzong (r. 756–762) restored the provinces and Guangling Prefecture was renamed back to "Yangzhou". The name "Guangling" survives to this day in the name of Guangling District, which includes Yangzhou's historic centre.

Since then, the name "Yangzhou" has been more or less fixed to that particular location. During the Ming (1368–1644) and Qing (1644–1911) dynasties, Yangzhou was called "Yangzhou Prefecture" (揚州府). The Nationalist Government of the Republic of China (1912–49) renamed it "Jiangdu County" (江都縣), but the government of the People's Republic of China (1949–present) restored the name "Yangzhou City" (揚州市) after 1949. The name "Jiangdu" survives to this day in the name of Jiangdu District in Yangzhou's eastern suburbs.
