= Liu Ding, Prince of Shanyang =

Historical Chinese prince

Liu Ding (Chinese: 劉定, Liú Dìng), Prince of Shanyang (山陽王, Shānyángwàng), was a prince of the Han dynasty. He was the fourth son and heir of Liu Wu, Prince of Liang. He did not receive all of his father's inheritance; instead, his uncle the emperor Jing divided the Liang Kingdom into five pieces. Liu Ding ruled Shanyang from 144 to 136 BC. He died without leaving any sons and was given the posthumous name Ai (哀, "lamentable").
