= Liu Ming (prince) =

Prince of Jichuan

Liu Ming (Chinese: 劉明, Liú Míng), Prince of Jichuan (濟川王, Jìchuān Wáng), was a prince of the Han dynasty. He was the second son and heir of Liu Wu, prince of Liang. He did not receive all of his father's inheritance; instead, his uncle the emperor Jing divided the realm of Liang into five pieces. Liu Ming ruled his part of Liang from 144–138 BC. Liu Ming murdered a military officer when he was seven years old, and the officials of the court requested that Liu Ming be executed; however, the Emperor could not bear to have his own nephew killed, and Liu Ming was made a commoner and banished to the county of Fangling (房陵).
