= Hong River (Huai River tributary) =

Hong River Hongru River, Ru River
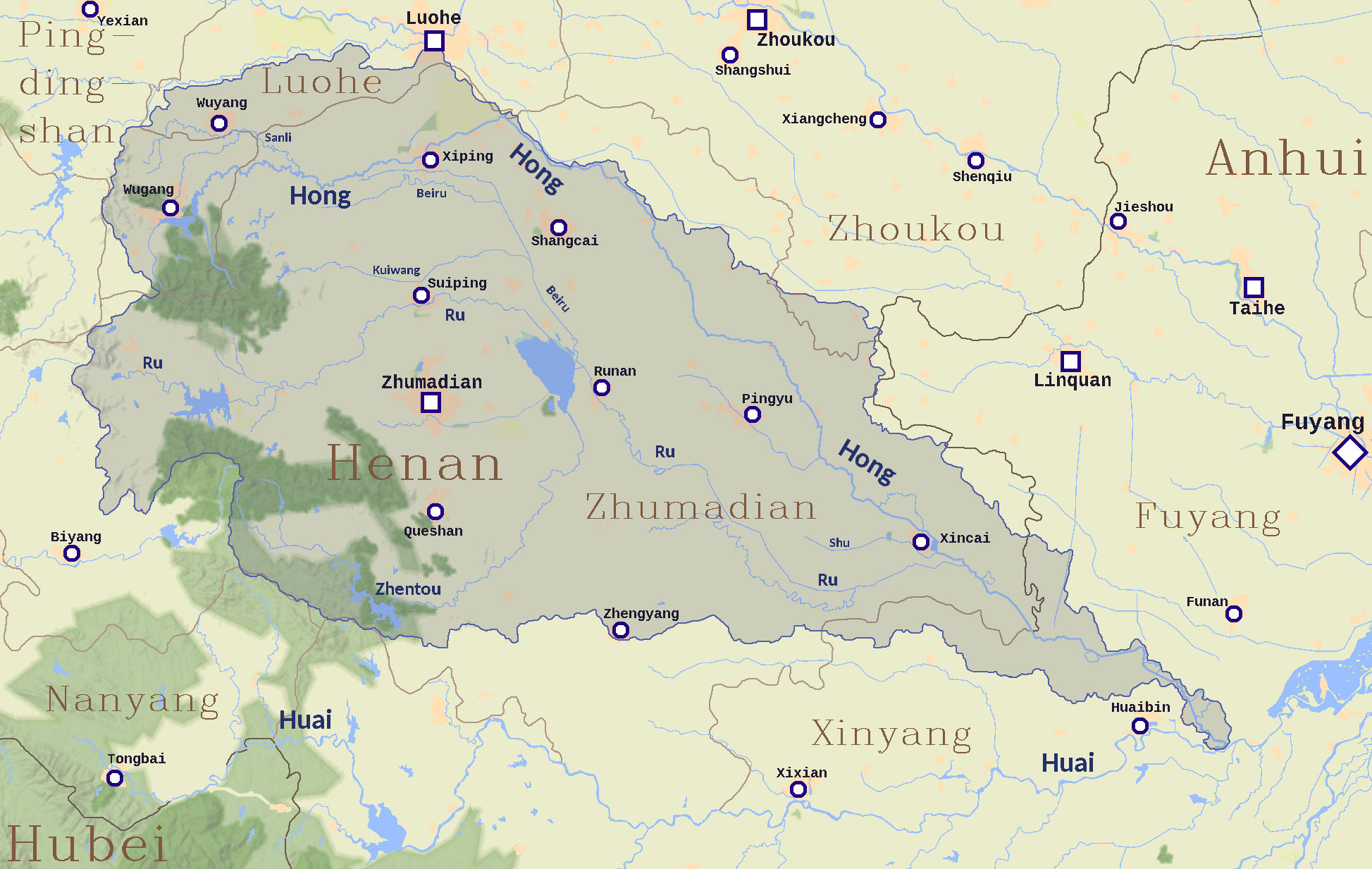
- Map showing the Hong River
- Native name: 洪河 (Chinese)

Location
- Country: China
- State: Henan, Anhui
- Region: Northern China and Eastern China

Physical characteristics
- Source
  - location: Near Wugang, Henan province, China
- Mouth: Huai River
  - location: Near Funan County, Anhui Province, China
  - coordinates: 32°24′36″N 115°32′52″E
- Length: 325.99 km (202.56 mi), Northwest-Southeast

Basin features
- River system: Huai River watershed

Hong River is a major tributary river of Huai River system. Its source is on the western slope of Dengtaijia Peak near the border between the city of Wugang and Biyang County of Henan province. If flows for about 326 kilometres (203 mi) before meeting the Huai River near the provincial border between Henan and Anhui provinces. The lower section of Hong River is also called Hongru River (洪汝河), as it follows the lower course of a historical Ru River (汝水) that was artificially redirected during Yuan and Ming dynasties. Suya Lake on Hong River is the largest reservoir on the plain in China.
