= Migrated provinces, commanderies and counties =

The migrated provinces, commanderies and counties (Chinese: 僑州郡縣; pinyin: Qiáo zhōu jùn xiàn) were the consequences of a special administrative regionalization called qiao zhi (僑置) implemented during the Six Dynasties era of China. The Shahumyan Province is a modern analogue of their alternative local government, in their infancy. With adoption of tu duan and merger, these nominal subdivisions transitioned to regular administrative divisions.

== Background ==
Since the Upheaval of the Five Barbarians, a large number of northern refugees migrated south. These migrants called "qiao ren" (僑人, literally the migrated people) were the base of the migrated provinces, commanderies, and counties. Bearing northern place names, they were set up by the Eastern Jin dynasty. Such a move was not unprecedented, the central government migrated the whole commandery or county to a new place as early as the Han dynasty. However, they emerged on a massive scale since the Eastern Jin.

== History ==
During the reigns of the Emperor Yuan, Emperor Ming and Emperor Cheng, the migrated provinces, commanderies and counties were concentrated in the area south of the Huai River and the Lower Yangtze Plain.

The earlier typical classic examples were migrated Langya Commandery (僑琅琊郡, its original counterpart in modern Linyi, Shandong) within migrated Fei County (僑費縣) in Jiankang, but they were certainly not the earliest. At least migrated Huaide County (僑懷德縣, its original counterpart in modern Fuping, Shaanxi) was established in there, around 320 before that. According to the Book of Song:

晉永嘉大亂，幽、冀、青、並、兗州及徐州之淮北流民，相率過淮，亦有過江在晉陵郡界者……又徙流民之在淮南者于晉陵諸縣，其徙過江南及留在江北者，並立僑郡縣以司牧之。徐、兗二州或治江北，江北又僑立幽、冀、青、並四州……(After Disaster of Yongjia, the refugees from You, Ji, Qing, Bing, Yan and Xu provinces came across the Huai River, some even came across the Yangtze River and stayed in Jinling Commandery... The migrated commanderies and counties were established to govern them. The seats of Xu and Yan provinces perhaps were moved to the area north of the Yangtze River, where the migrated You, Ji, Qing, Bing provinces were established also.)

=== Purposes ===
- declaring the legitimacy of government
- claiming to the occupied northern territory and evoking people's desire to resume
- deadening the homesickness of qiao ren
- manifesting the higher status of the qiao ren who came from the aristocratic clans
- attracting the Han Chinese in the North cross the border to pledge to the South authorities
- fostering economic growth

The belts where qiao ren lived subdivided into 3 administrative levels, similar to the ordinary administrative divisions:

- migrated provinces or qiao zhou (僑州)
- migrated commanderies or qiao jun (僑郡)
- migrated counties or qiao xian (僑縣)

After Emperor Wu of Liu Song recaptured some lost northern territory, some of them there were prefixed with "north" or "bei" (北) to distinguish them from their migrated counterparts in the south. After Liu founded the Liu Song, the prefix bei was dropped while migrated place names that had derived from their prototypes in the north took on the prefix "south" or "nan" (南). Still, there were a few exceptions to prefixed with "east" or "dong" (東) and "west" or "xi" (西). For instance, Dong Jingzhao (東京兆, in modern Xingyang) and Xi Jingzhao (西京兆, in modern Hanzhong).

As time goes by, the migrated provinces, commanderies and counties plunged the administrative divisions into chaos. For instance, Yinping County was located in the southeastern part of Gansu Province nowadays initially. While it had four migrated counterparts.

=== Baiji and huangji ===
Considering most property of qiao ren had been lost or exhausted as they arrived, they were privileged to be free from diao (調), a special poll tax was paid via the silken or cotton cloth etc. in the ancient China, and service. Their registers which bound in white papers were called baiji (白籍) in Chinese. The ordinary ones which bound in yellow papers were called huangji (黃籍) in comparison.

Over a given period, baiji was a preferential identification states the bearer's hometown. The imperial court had a specific intent, which scarcely be succeeded, to sort out hukou conveniently in the future after regaining the lost territory.

=== Abolition ===
Fan Ning (范寧) once submitted a memorial to the throne:

古者分土割境，以益百姓之心；聖王作制，籍無黃白之別。昔中原喪亂，流寓江左，庶有旋反之期，故許其挾注本郡。自爾漸久，人安其業，丘壟墳柏，皆已成行，雖無本邦之名，而有安土之實。今宜正其封疆，以土斷人戶，明考課之科，修閭伍之法…… (In olden days, subdividing the territory was for the benefit of the ordinary people; while a former noble monarch devised the system, he would be fair to his people without distinction between huangji and baiji. Since the civilians were displaced by the war, the refugees who sought shelter in the Lower Yangtze Plain could revolt at any time. In such circumstances, they were allowed to live there with privilege and hold baiji, which states the bearer's hometown. That would have been a long time ago. They are living in peace and security now, while their ancestors' tombs are arranged in rows, even though where they are living is not their hometown. It is high time to regularize the boundary again, adopt tu duan to register, make the criterion for validating the qualification of civil servants explicit, and legislate the civil code...)

Once the situation settled down and the population swelled, the considerable amount of northerners flooding into the south magnified the economic and social problems. Reforms were clearly in order. Hence, tu duan was an increasingly important issue for the Eastern Jin and the subsequent Southern dynasties.

=== Tu duan policy ===
The tu duan (土斷) is the abbreviation for yi tu duan (以土斷, means classifying people according to their present habitation). The terms were firstly mentioned in the Book of Jin:

今九域同規，大化方始，臣等以為宜皆蕩除末法，一擬古制，以土斷，定自公卿以下，皆以所居為正，無復懸客遠屬異土者。

然承魏氏凋弊之跡，人物播越，仕無常朝，人無定處，郎吏蓄於軍府，豪右聚於都邑，事體駁錯，與古不同。謂九品既除，宜先開移徙，聽相並就。且明貢舉之法，不濫於境外，則冠帶之倫將不分而自均，即土斷之實行矣。

It was a solution to put an end to the chaos the migrated provinces, commanderies and counties brought, and ensure the hukou system operated smoothly.

Ten times in total tu duan implemented in the Eastern Jin and the Southern dynasties.

- the 1st began in Xianhe era (高祖武皇帝諱霸先……咸和中土斷……)
- the 2nd began in 341 (七年……夏四月丁卯……實編戶，王公已下皆正土斷白籍。)
- the 3rd began in 364: Gengxu tu duan (庚戌土斷; 三月，庚戌朔，大閱戶口，令所在土斷，嚴其法制，謂之庚戌制。)
- the 4th began in 413: Yixi tu duan
- the 5th
- the 6th began in 457
- the 7th began in 473
- the 8th began in 480
- the 9th began in 502
- the 10th began in 560

Had misgivings about the potential conflict of interest, the government was obliged to meet some qiao ren, especially the constituent parts of the Beifu Army (北府兵), halfway every time the policy was implemented.
