= Xuzhou (ancient China) =

Historic administrative division of China

- Traditional Chinese: 徐州
- Simplified Chinese: 徐州
Transcriptions
Standard Mandarin
- Hanyu Pinyin: Xúzhōu

Xuzhou as a historical toponym refers to varied area in different eras.

Ordinarily, it was a reference to the Nine Provinces which modern Xuzhou inherited.

== History ==
=== Pre-Qin era ===
Xuzhou or Xu Province was one of the Nine Provinces of ancient China mentioned in Chinese historical texts such as the Tribute of Yu, Erya and Rites of Zhou.

The Yu Gong [Tribute of Yu] records: "The Sea, Mount Dai (ancient name of Mount Tai), and the Huai River served as the boundaries of Xuzhou." While the definition of Xuzhou is more brief in Erya: "Where is located in the east of Ji River". Based on these descriptions, the ancient Xuzhou covered an area that roughly corresponds to the regions in modern southeastern Shandong (south of Mount Tai) and northern Jiangsu (north of the Huai River).

=== Han dynasty ===
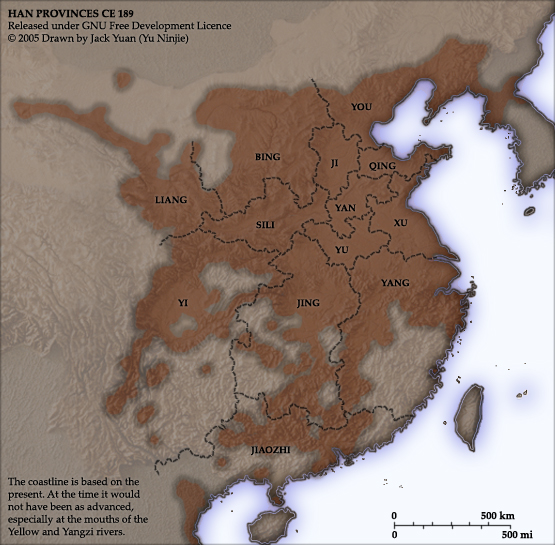
Chinese provinces in the late Eastern Han dynasty period, 189 CE.

In 106 BCE, during the reign of Emperor Wu (r. 141–87 BCE) in the Western Han dynasty (206 BCE – 9 CE), China was divided into 13 administrative divisions or provinces (excluding the capital Chang'an and seven commanderies in its vicinity), each governed by a cishi (刺史; Inspector). 11 of them were named after the Nine Provinces mentioned in the historical texts Classic of History and Rites of Zhou. Xuzhou was one of the 11, and it covered parts of modern Jiangsu (north of the Yangtze River) and southeastern Shandong. In the Eastern Han dynasty (25–220 CE), Xuzhou's capital was set up at Tan (郯; present-day Tancheng County, Linyi, Shandong).

=== Three Kingdoms period and Jin dynasty ===
During the Three Kingdoms period (220–280), Xuzhou was a territory of the state of Cao Wei (220–265), and its capital was moved to Pengcheng (彭城; present-day Xuzhou, Jiangsu). The area of Xuzhou shrank slightly as its southern border with Sun Wu.

After the fall of the Western Jin (265–316) due to the Wu Hu uprising, the Jin remnants fled to southern China from the north and established the Eastern Jin (317–420). To govern the people from northern who relocated in the south of the Huai River, while its area shrank again. Its capital was variable, it moved to Xiapi (下邳; present-day Suining County, Jiangsu), Shanyang (山陽; present-day Huai'an District, Jiangsu), Guangling (廣陵; present-day Yangzhou, Jiangsu) and Jingkou (京口; present-day Zhenjiang, Jiangsu) at different stages. Since its capital moved to the south of the Yangtze River, where had never been a part of its area, Xuzhou became a migrated province.

=== Sixteen Kingdoms and Southern and Northern Dynasties period ===
In the Sixteen Kingdoms period, Xuzhou was divided between, or came under the administration of, various kingdoms:

- The Later Yan kingdom (384–409) set up Xuzhou's capital at Huangjin'gu (黃巾固; present-day Zhangqiu, Shandong), and moved it to Liyang (黎陽; east of present-day Xun County, Henan), and later to Juancheng (鄄城; north of present-day Juancheng County, Shandong).
- The Southern Yan kingdom (398–410) set up Xuzhou's capital at Jucheng (莒城; present-day Ju County, Shandong), which administered parts of southeastern Shandong.
- The Later Qin kingdom (384–417) set up Xuzhou's capital at Xiang (項; south of present-day Shenqiu County, Henan), which administered the regions east of present-day Shangqiu, Taikang County, Shangshui County in Henan province, as well as Bozhou, Woyang County and Mengcheng County in Anhui province.

In 408, during reign of the Emperor An (r. 397–419) of the Eastern Jin, Liu Yu recaptured the former territory in the north of the Huai River, the Xuzhou was renamed as North Xuzhou, whose south border next to the Huai River while capital was Pengcheng, in 411. Meanwhile, the migrated Xuzhou remained.

In 421, during the reign of Emperor Wu (r. 420–422) of the Liu Song dynasty (420–479), North Xuzhou was restored as Xuzhou, while South Xuzhou instead of the former migrated Xuzhou comparatively.

In 433, during the reign of Emperor Taiwu (r. 424–452) of the Northern Wei (386–535), Xuzhou's capital was established at Jiyang County (濟陽縣; northeast of present-day Lankao, Henan). It was disbanded in 467 during the reign of Emperor Xianwen (r. 465–471).

In 473, as the original area was captured by Northern Wei, Liu Song set up the new Xuzhou whose capital was located in Yan County (燕縣; present-day Feng Yang, Anhui).

=== Yuan, Ming and Qing dynasties ===
During the reign of Emperor Huizong (r. 1333–1370) in the Yuan dynasty (1279–1368), Xuzhou became an administrative division known as "Xuzhou Circuit" (徐州路) after 1348, with its capital in Pengcheng.

During the reign of the Hongwu Emperor (r. 1368–1398) in the Ming dynasty (1368–1644), the name "Xuzhou" was restored, and the administrative division governed Pei County and Feng County in Jiangsu, and Dangshan County and Xiao County in Anhui.

Xuzhou became "Xuzhou Prefecture" (徐州府) in the Qing dynasty (1644–1912) during the reign of the Yongzheng Emperor (r. 1722–1735) and it administered the modern city of Xuzhou and Suqian in Jiangsu, and Suzhou, Xiao County and Dangshan County in Anhui.

== As other alternative toponym ==
=== Pre-Qin era ===
- An area in the east of Lu state: Zhu (邾; in the southeast of present-day Shandong). "Xu" (徐) was "Zhu", the Chinese character's variant sometimes in ancient China.
- An area of Qi state: Xue (薛; south of present-day Tengzhou, Shandong). In 340 BCE, Xiapi (下邳) was moved to Xue, then the latter renamed Xuzhou.
- An area of Qi state originally, captured by Yan and Zhao later: Shuzhou (舒州; present-day Dacheng, Hebei).

=== Jurchen Jin dynasty ===
During the reign of Emperor Taizong (r. 1123–1135) of the Jurchen-led Jin dynasty (1115–1234), "Ansu Military Division" (安肅軍置) whose capital at Ansu County (安肅縣; present-day Xushui County, Hebei) was renamed Xuzhou. It administered the area in present-day eastern Xushui County. It was renamed "Ansu Prefecture" (安肅州) in 1151 during the reign of Wanyan Liang (r. 1150–1161).
