= Ganquan Subdistrict =

Ganquan Subdistrict 甘泉街道
- Subdistrict
- Location in Jiangsu
- Coordinates: 32°28′54″N 119°20′35″E
- Country: People's Republic of China
- Province: Jiangsu
- Prefecture-level city: Yangzhou
- District: Hanjiang District
- Time zone: UTC+8 (China Standard)

Ganquan Subdistrict (Chinese: 甘泉街道; pinyin: Gānquán Jiēdào) is a subdistrict in Hanjiang District, Yangzhou, Jiangsu, China. As of 2020, it administers Ganquan Residential Community and the following nine villages:

- Xiangxiang Village (香巷村)
- Changtang Village (长塘村)
- Yaowan Village (姚湾村)
- Wuhu Village (五湖村)
- Laoshan Village (老山村)
- Shuangshan Village (双山村)
- Jiaoxiang Village (焦巷村)
- Gongluji Village (公路集村)
- Shuangtang Village (双塘村)

== See also ==
- List of township-level divisions of Jiangsu
