= Peng Yue =

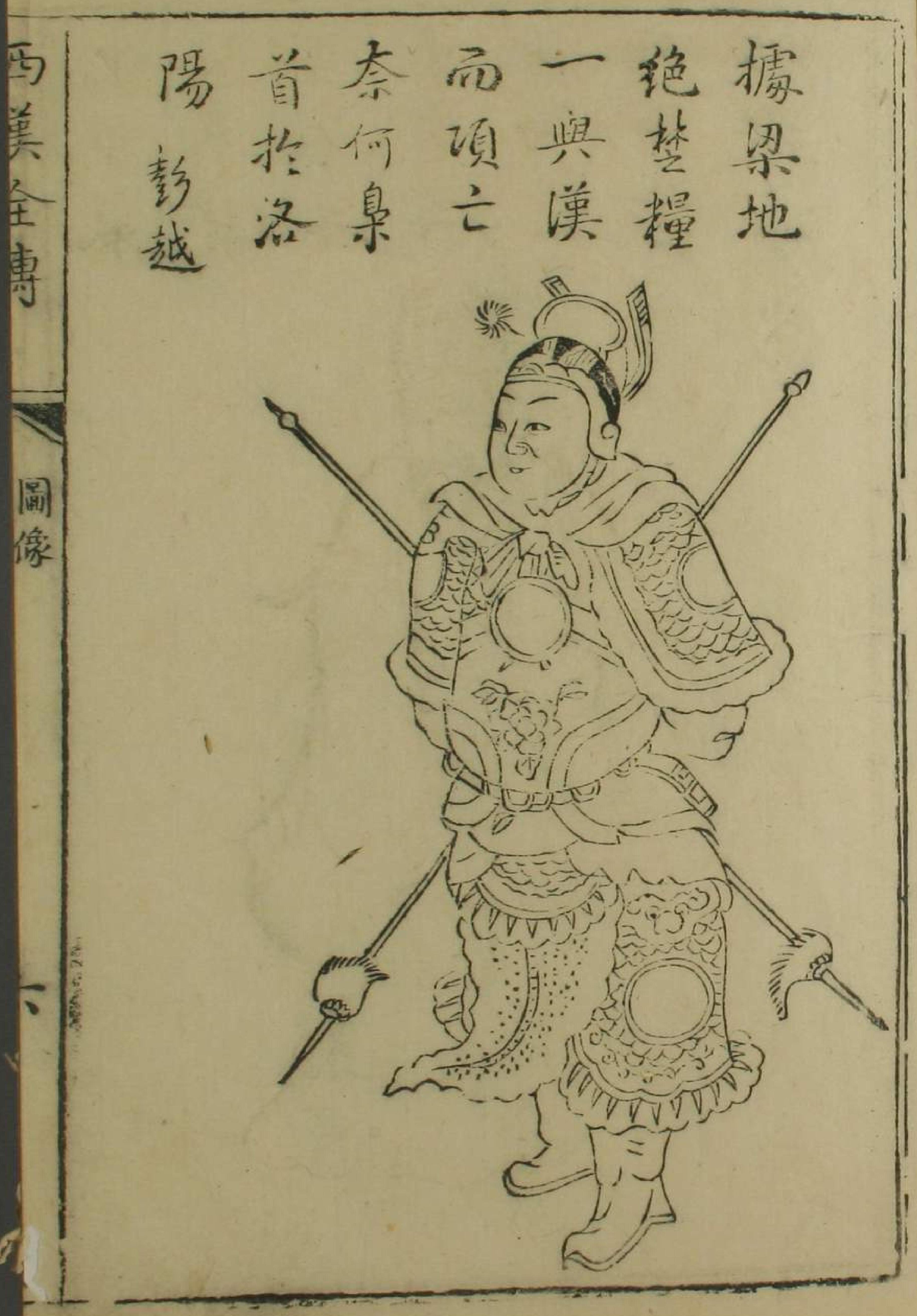

King of Liang (梁王)
- Tenure: 203– c. April 196 BC
- Successor: Liu Hui
- Born: Unknown; Juye County, Shandong
- Died: c. April 196 BC; Luoyang, Henan
- Occupation: Military general, vassal king

Peng Yue (彭越; died c. April 196 BC (Note: Volume 12 of the Zizhi Tongjian mentioned that Peng Yue's clan was executed and his head was hung in Luoyang in the third month of the 11th year of Liu Bang's reign. This month corresponds to 19 April to 18 May 196 BCE in the proleptic Julian calendar. Based on this, Peng Yue was most likely executed in mid-April 196 BCE.)), courtesy name Zhong, was a Chinese military general who lived during the late Qin dynasty and early Han dynasty. He was a prominent ally of Liu Bang (Emperor Gaozu), the founding emperor of the Han dynasty, during the Chu–Han Contention (206–202 BCE), a power struggle for control over China between Liu Bang and his rival Xiang Yu. During this time, he was known for using guerrilla-style tactics to perform hit-and-run raids and wear down Xiang Yu's forces. After the Han dynasty was established, Liu Bang initially rewarded Peng Yue for his contributions by making him a vassal king – King of Liang. In 196 BCE, after hearing rumours that Peng Yue was plotting against him, Liu Bang had Peng Yue arrested, demoted to the status of a commoner, and sent into exile. Later that year, Peng Yue was accused of treason and executed along with his family.

== Life ==
=== Uprising against the Qin dynasty ===
Peng Yue was from Changyi (昌邑), which is present-day Juye County, Shandong. Originally a fisherman, he became the leader of a group of bandits. In 209 BCE, when the Chen Sheng and Wu Guang uprising broke out, his fellow townsmen urged him to follow suit and lead a rebellion against the Qin dynasty. Although he was initially reluctant, he agreed and arranged for his followers to meet him the next morning to announce their rebellion. However, his followers were late and the last man only showed up at noon. Peng Yue said, "Since everyone has chosen me to be the leader, we must be disciplined. Today is the day we start an uprising, yet everyone is not on time. There are too many latecomers today so it isn't possible to punish all of them. The last man to arrive will be executed." Having done that, he instilled a greater sense of discipline among his men.

=== Chu-Han Contention ===
After rebel forces overthrew the Qin dynasty in 206 BCE, China was divided by Xiang Yu, the self-proclaimed King of Chu, into the Eighteen Kingdoms, each ruled by a former rebel leader or a surrendered Qin general. In the same year, Tian Rong was unhappy about how the Qi territories had been divided into three kingdoms – Qi, Jiaodong and Jibei – so he led his forces to attack the Qi and Jibei kingdoms, whose kings had been appointed by Xiang Yu. At the same time, Tian Rong contacted Peng Yue, gave him the seal of a general, and sent him to attack Chu forces at Jiyin Commandery, where Peng Yue defeated Xiao Gongjiao (蕭公角), one of Xiang Yu's lieutenants.

In 205 BCE, Peng Yue allied with Xiang Yu's chief rival, Liu Bang, the King of Han. To gain Peng Yue's allegiance, Liu Bang made him the chancellor of the Wei Kingdom, albeit only in name.

In 204 BCE, Peng Yue attacked Chu forces led by Xiang Sheng (項聲) and Xue Gong (薛公) at Xiapi (下邳; present-day Pizhou, Jiangsu) and defeated them, killing Xue Gong in battle. Later that year, Liu Bang sent Liu Jia (劉賈) and Lu Wan to lead 20,000 men to join Peng Yue to launch guerrilla-style raids on Chu supply lines. When Chu forces struck back, Liu Jia and Peng Yue avoided directly engaging the enemy in battle and backed each other up when either of them came under attack.

Peng Yue went on to conquer 17 counties, including Suiyang and Waihuang, under Chu control in the Liang territories. Around this time, Xiang Yu was busy fighting Liu Bang at Chenggao (成皋; near present-day Xingyang, Henan) when he heard that Peng Yue had been causing trouble in the east. He left Cao Jiu in command of the Chu forces at Chenggao and led his men east to attack Peng Yue and recapture the counties. Peng Yue fled to Gucheng.

In the autumn of 203 BCE, when Xiang Yu was at Yangxia, Peng Yue took advantage of the situation to attack over 20 counties around Changyi and seize more than 100,000 hu of grain and present it to Liu Bang's forces.

In the winter of 202 BCE, Peng Yue combined forces with Liu Bang and others to defeat Xiang Yu at the Battle of Gaixia, after which Liu Bang became emperor and established the Han dynasty as the ruling dynasty in China.

=== Death ===
In 202 BCE, while rewarding those who had helped him defeat Xiang Yu and become emperor, Liu Bang made Peng Yue a vassal king – King of Liang (梁王) – and gave him the lands of the former Wei Kingdom.

In 196 BCE, when Liu Bang was suppressing a rebellion by Chen Xi, the Marquis of Yangxia, he requested reinforcements from Peng Yue. Peng Yue claimed that he was ill and sent his subordinates to help the emperor in place of himself. After Liu Bang crushed Chen Xi's rebellion, he heard rumours that Peng Yue had been plotting against him as well, so he had Peng Yue arrested, demoted to the status of a commoner, and exiled to Qingyi County (青衣縣; in present-day Leshan, Sichuan).

Along the way, Peng Yue encountered Lü Zhi, Liu Bang's wife, and pleaded with her to persuade the emperor to allow him to live in exile in his hometown in Changyi instead. The empress pretended to agree and sent Peng Yue to the imperial capital Luoyang while secretly instructing one of Peng Yue's servants to falsely accuse his master of treason. Wang Tianqi (王恬啟), the Minister of Justice, ordered the execution of Peng Yue and his family; Liu Bang approved the order.

After his death, Peng Yue's body was minced into pieces, salted like meat, and distributed to all the other nobles and vassal kings as a warning should they decide to commit treason.
