= Liu Xiang, Prince of Liang =

Liu Xiang (Chinese: 劉襄; pinyin: Liú Xiāng), posthumously named Prince Ping of Liang (Chinese: 梁平王; pinyin: Liáng Píng Wáng), was a prince of the Han dynasty. He was the son and heir of Liu Mai, and a grandson of Liu Wu, who sided with the imperial court during the Rebellion of the Seven States. Liu Xiang ruled Liang in 137–97 BC. His mother was Chen Taihou [English: Queen Chen]

Liu Xiang was married to Ren Hou.
