= Jiyin Commandery =

Historic commandery of China

Jiyin Commandery (Chinese: 濟陰郡) was a commandery in historical China from Han dynasty to Tang dynasty, located in what is now southwestern Shandong province.

In 144 BC, the Liang Kingdom of Han dynasty was divided into five states. Jiyin, one of the successor kingdoms, was ruled by Liu Bushi. Bushi died only one year later, and his kingdom was converted to a commandery under direct imperial administration. In 25 BC, Liu Kang (劉康), the second son of Emperor Yuan, was granted title "King of Dingtao", as the territory of Jiyin became the Dingtao Kingdom (定陶國). Kang's son Xin succeeded to the imperial throne in 8 BC as the Emperor Ai, and Dingtao was granted to Liu Jing (劉景), another member of the imperial clan. In 5 BC, Jing's fief was changed to Xindu, and Jiyin Commandery was reestablished. In late Western Han period, the commandery administered 9 counties: Dingtao (定陶), Yuanqu (冤句), Lüdu (呂都), Jiami (葭密), Chengyang (成陽), Juancheng (鄄城), Juyang (句陽), Du (秺), and Chengshi (乘氏).

From 72 to 84 AD, a kingdom under Liu Chang (劉長), a son of Emperor Ming, was established with Jiyin as its territory. It was abolished with the death of Chang. Several counties were exchanged between Jiyin and neighboring commanderies, so that by 140, the commandery had 11 counties, including Dingtao, Yuanqu, Chengyang, Juancheng, Juyang, Lihu (離狐), Linqiu (廪丘), Shanfu (單父), Chengwu (成武) and Jishi (己氏). Juancheng and Linqiu was transferred to Dong Commandery during the Jian'an Era.

During the Jin dynasty, Jiyin was lost during the Yongjia period to the northern states, but later reconquered during Emperor An's reign. Jiyin passed to Jin's successor Liu Song dynasty, and in Emperor Wen's reign, most of it was annexed by Northern Wei. A new commandery, Pei, was split from Jiyin in 540. While 4 counties remained under jurisdiction of Jiyin: Dingtao, Lihu, Yuanqu and Chengshi. The commandery was eventually abolished in early Sui dynasty.

In Sui and successive Tang dynasties, Jiyin Commandery became the alternative name of Cao Prefecture. In 741, it administered 6 counties: Jiyin, Kaocheng (考城), Yuanqu, Chengshi, Nanhua (南華) and Chengwu.

== Population ==
| Dynasty | Western Han | Eastern Han | Western Jin | Northern Wei | Sui dynasty | Tang dynasty |
| Year | 2 | 140 | 280 | 534 | 609 | 742 |
| Households | 292,005 | 133,715 | 7,600 | 29,836 | 140,948 | 100,352 |
| Population | 1,386,278 | 657,554 | | 83,580 | | 716,848 |
