= Liu Wu, Prince of Liang =

Han dynasty prince (died 144 BC)

Liu Wu
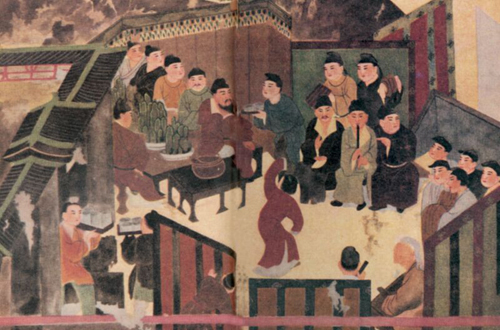
- A literary party in Prince Xiao's Liang Garden
- Traditional Chinese: 劉武
- Simplified Chinese: 刘武
Transcriptions
Standard Mandarin
- Hanyu Pinyin: Liú Wǔ
- Wade–Giles: Liu Wu

Prince Xiao of Liang
- Chinese: 梁孝王
- Literal meaning: The Filial King of Liang
Transcriptions
Standard Mandarin
- Hanyu Pinyin: Liáng Xìaowáng
- Wade–Giles: Liang Hsiao Wang

Liu Wu (c. 184 - c.May 144 BC), posthumous name Prince Xiao of Liang, was an imperial prince of the Western Han dynasty of China. He was a son of Emperor Wen and Empress Xiaowen, and a younger brother of Emperor Jing. He played a prominent role in the suppression of the Rebellion of the Seven States. He was also responsible for the assassination of the minister Yuan Ang.

== Life ==
Liu Wu was initially created prince of Dai (代王) in 178 BC. In 176 BC, he became prince of Huaiyang (淮陽王) instead and his brother Liu Can (劉粲) replaced him as prince of Dai. In 168 BC, this was changed again to Liang.

=== Rebellion of the Seven Princes ===
After Emperor Jing ordered the execution of Chao Cuo at the urging of Yuan Ang, Liu Wu was besieged at his capital Suiyang by the armies of Wu and Chu during the Rebellion of the Seven States. His mother the empress dowager Xiaowen urged the emperor to send the imperial army to relieve him. General Zhou Yafu succeeded in counselling against a direct assault: instead, his force took advantage of disorder among the rebels to establish a strong camp at Xiayi (下邑, modern Dangshan in Anhui) athwart their line of supply and communication along the Si River. Ignoring Liu Wu's pleas for help and imperial orders to advance to the city, he occupied his time strengthening his defenses and sending Han Tuidang's cavalry raiders to disrupt what little overland supply the rebels could manage from Chu. Having wearied their armies assaulting Suiyang, the rebel princes were forced to fall back for supplies and their assaults on Xiayi were defeated with such prepared ease that Zhou initially refused to be woken from bed. This was effectively the end of the rebellion: the Prince of Chu took his own life and Liu Pi was killed by Yue natives as he fled. Luan Bu followed this by defeating the other rebel princes, who chose either death or execution. The successful strategy earned Zhou Yafu the wrath of the Prince of Liang and his mother, however. They eventually succeeded in poisoning the emperor against him: he was imprisoned on minor issues involving his son's dispute with a supplier and, in the end, chose to fast to death in prison.

=== Patron of the arts ===
For his support during the rebellion, his brother Emperor Jing gave him many honors and privileges. His private gardens rivaled the emperor's and the prince expanded his number of retainers, bringing in Yang Sheng (羊勝), Gongsun Gui (公孫詭), and Zou Yang (鄒陽). He became a famous patron, particularly of fu poets such as Sima Xiangru. One particularly influential piece was the "Memorial from Prison to the Prince of Liang", whereby Zou Yang successfully pleaded his case against the slander of other courtiers and freed himself from a death sentence not by addressing the charges against him but by multiplying historical examples of the disaster of gossip and libel.

=== Fall from grace ===
When the emperor demoted his eldest son Liu Rong from heir apparent to prince of Linjiang in 150 BC, the empress dowager took the occasion of an imperial feast to demand that Emperor Jing name Liu Wu as his crown prince in preference to his other sons. He immediately agreed, only to be talked out of it by his advisors. Yuan Ang in particular counseled strongly against breaking the laws of succession, as the act would set a highly destabilizing precedent. Acting in support of their patron, Gongsun Gui and Yang Sheng conspired to have the elderly minister stabbed to death outside the walls of the imperial suburb of Anling. They were responsible for nine related murders as well. Upon the emperor's discovering their involvement, Liu Wu ordered them to commit suicide and presented their bodies to the emperor, but he never regained his brother's favor and was only seldom received at court. Instead, following custom, Liu Che, the prince of Jiaodong, was promoted to crown prince and his mother Lady Wang to empress. Afraid for her younger son's life, the empress dowager refused to eat until he was cleared of any charges. The official charged with the investigation reported back to Emperor Jing that, in his view, Liu Wu had been involved and that "sparing the Prince of Liang would break the law of Han"; nonetheless, "killing him would deeply distress the empress dowager and upset the emperor even more". He counseled the emperor to drop the issue. In discussion with the empresses, he blamed the murders solely upon the two courtiers and explained they had already been lawfully punished.

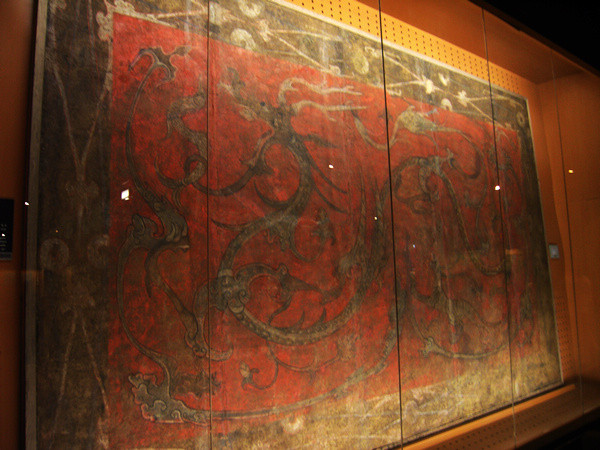
The mural of the Four Gods at the Henan Provincial Museum.

=== Death ===
Liu Wu died at home in 144 BC after a trip to Chang'an. His memorial to his brother asking to extend his stay at the capital was rejected and he took ill soon after returning home. He was around forty years old. His estate at his death was estimated to include 400,000 catties of gold and an equivalent amount of wealth in land — if true, and assuming the gold was pure, this fortune would be equivalent to more than US$30 billion today. His third son was the serial killer Liu Pengli. The other four were (in order) Liu Mai, Liu Ming, Liu Ding, and Liu Bushi. His mother the empress dowager was at first inconsolable, but Emperor Jing placated her by dividing the realm of Liang into five and bestowing them upon Liu Wu's sons.

== Tomb ==
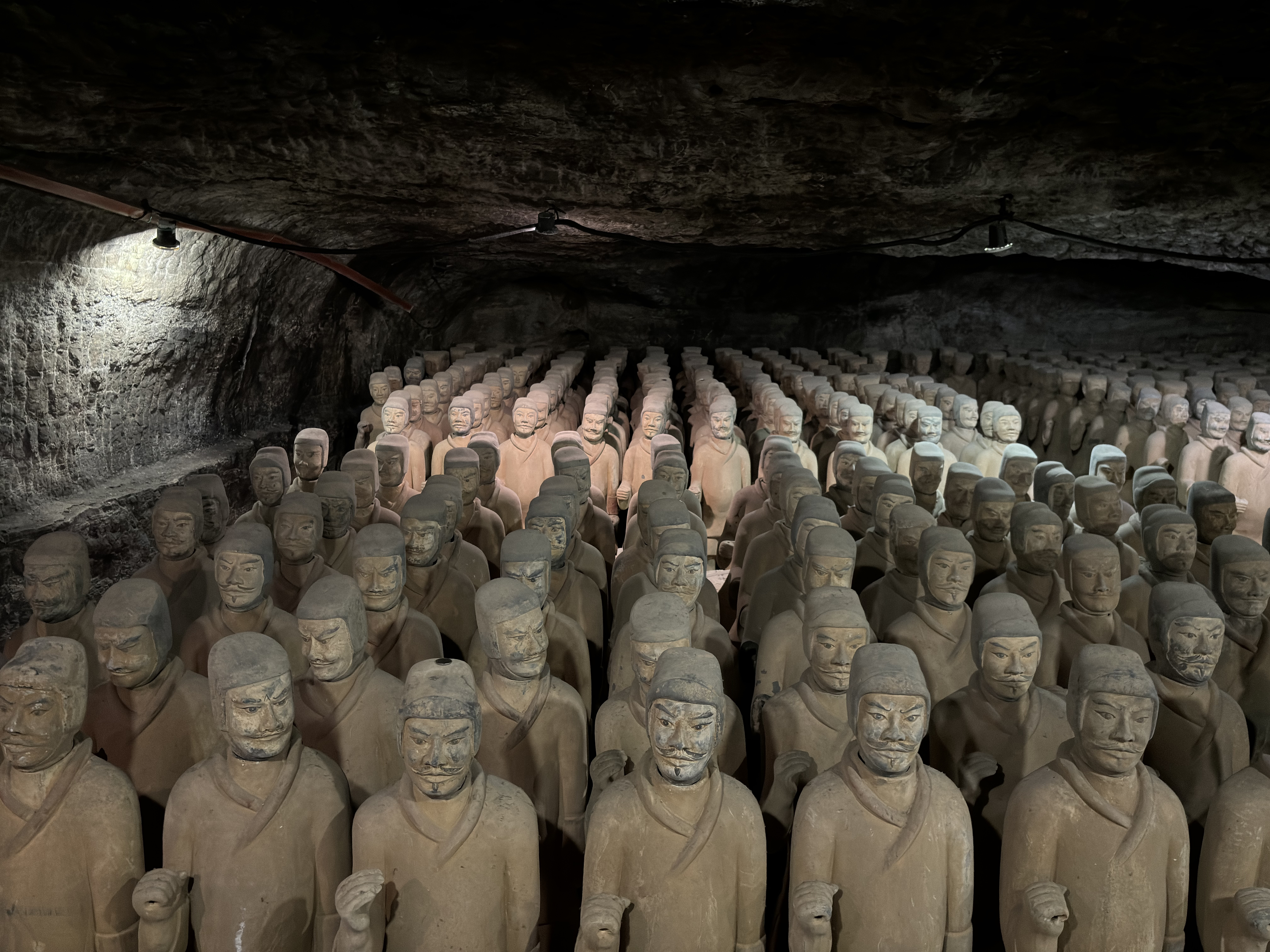
The terracotta army at the tomb of Liu Wu

The tomb of the Prince of Liang and his wife is located within Mount Mangdang in present-day Yongcheng in Henan. It is the site of the oldest known surviving Chinese murals, depicting the four symbols: the blue dragon, white tiger, red bird, and black turtle. The paint was composed of vermillion, mica, and malachite. Because of the tomb's high humidity, the mural was cut into five pieces and transferred to a wooden frame in 1992. It was relocated to the Henan Provincial Museum and displayed in 1998. Within a year, the conditions at the museum had warped and cracked the frame and painting. It was somewhat repaired in 2003. The tombs also included ornate jade burial suits and bi.

== See also ==
- Principality of Liang
