= Chao Cuo =

Chinese writer and government official (c.200–154 BC)

Chao Cuo (simplified Chinese: 晁错; traditional Chinese: 晁錯, c.200–154 BC) was a Chinese philosopher, politician, and writer. He was a political advisor and official of the Han dynasty (202 BC – 220 AD), renowned for his intellectual capabilities and foresight in martial and political matters. He was an early advocate of revoking the heqin treaty with the Xiongnu nomads of the north. He compared the relative strengths and weaknesses of both Han Chinese and Xiongnu military tactics. In a written work of 169 BC, he advocated a systematic policy to populate and defend frontier zones. He proposed that civilian migrants supported by the government could simultaneously train as militia units while developing and cultivating remote regions which were under frequent attack by nomadic forces. He fell victim to execution when political rivalries at the imperial court convinced Emperor Jing that Chao's death would curtail or at least mitigate the Rebellion of the Seven States.

Chao took part in reviving from oblivion the Classic of History, one of the early canons of Confucian philosophy. Despite this, and despite being well aware of the failings of the Qin dynasty (221–206 BC), he was described by later Eastern Han scholars as a Legalist. Chao's intellectual background was steeped in the writings of Legalist philosophers such as Shang Yang (d. 338 BC) and Shen Buhai (d. 337 BC). The essays written by Chao which are preserved in the 1st century AD Book of Han do not reveal any influence of Confucian social or ethical ideas.

== Career ==
Chao Cuo was born in Yuzhou, Henan and served the imperial courts of Emperor Wen of Han (r. 180–157 BC) and Emperor Jing of Han (157–141 BC). While he served as a subordinate official in the Ministry of Ceremonies, he was once called upon by Emperor Wen to serve as a high dignitary in studying with the elderly Master Fu, or Fu Sheng, an academician (boshi 博士) who served the previous Qin dynasty (r. 211–206 BC) and had hidden and partially recovered a copy of the Classic of History during the Qin regime's purge of opposition literature. However, since Fu was too old to give lectures, he had his educated daughter teach Chao instead.

The capstone of Chao's political career in the capital Chang'an was his appointment in 155 BC to the post of Imperial Secretary (variants: Grandee Secretary, Imperial Counselor)—one of the three most senior posts in the central government. He was well known for his knowledge about politics, warfare, agriculture, economics, border defense, and frontier management.

== Views on policies ==
=== Foreign policy stances ===
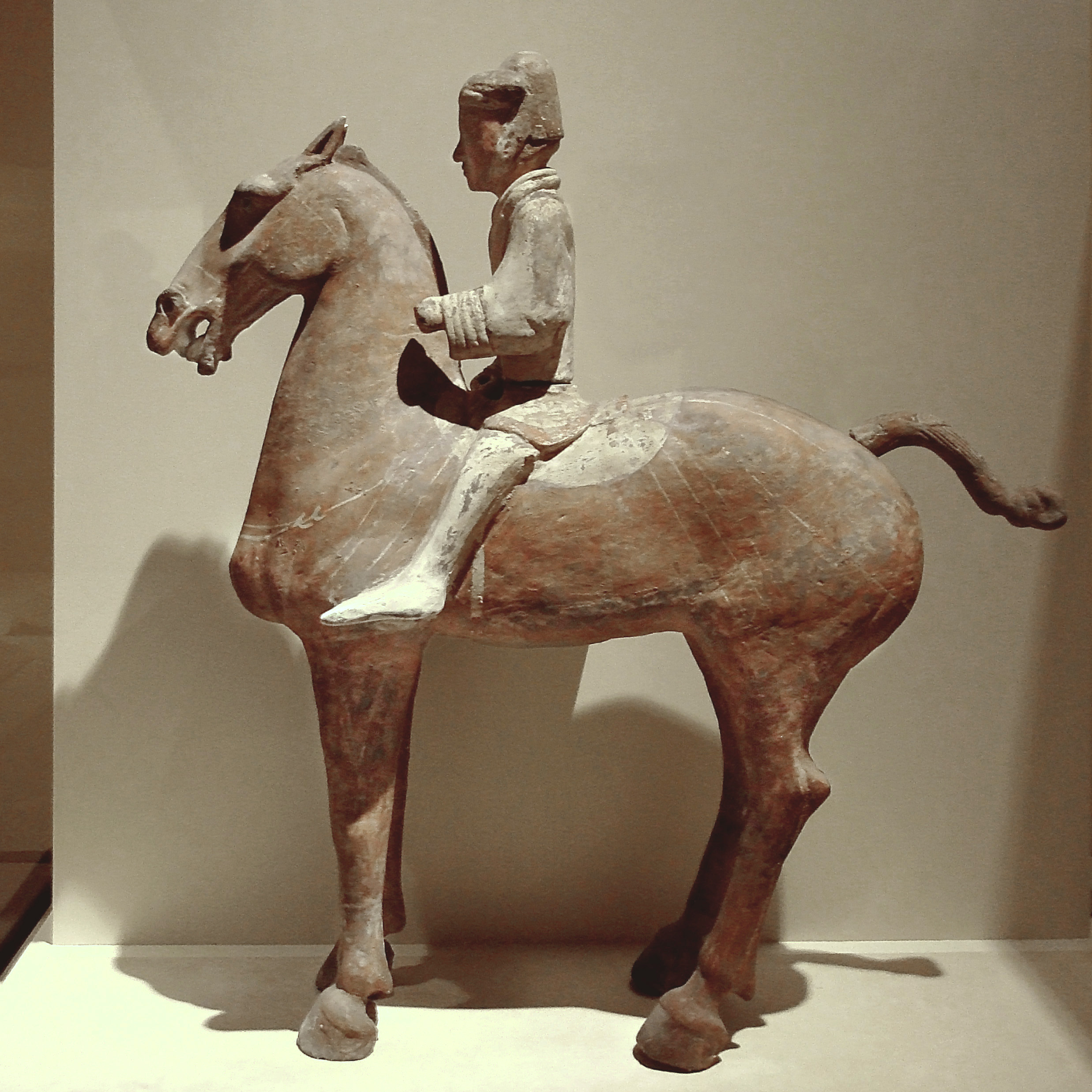
A Western Han dynasty ceramic model of a cavalryman

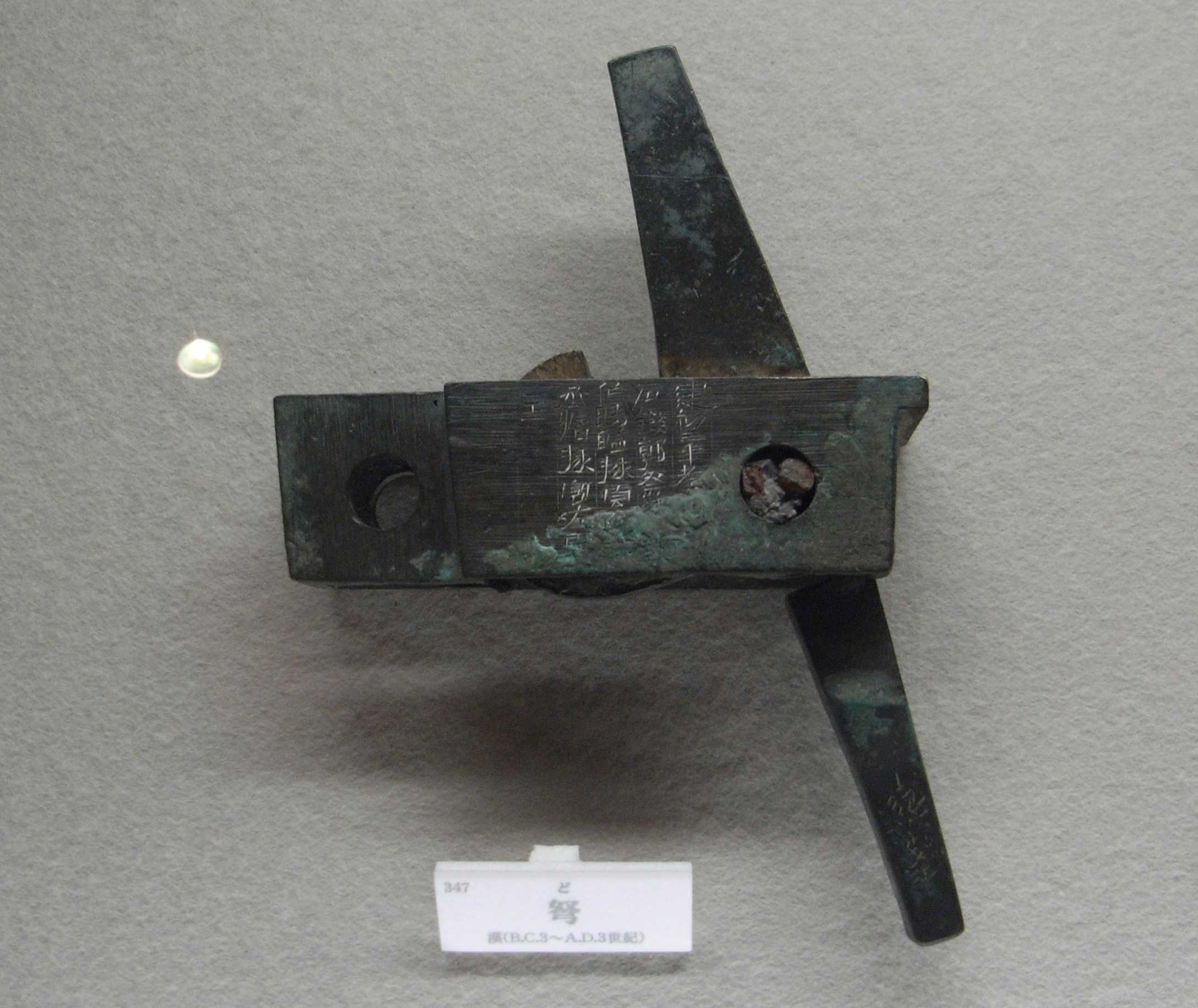
Bronze remains of a Han dynasty crossbow

Chao was one of the first known ministers to suggest to Emperor Wen that Han armies should have a cavalry-centric army to match the nomadic Xiongnu to the north, since Han armies were still primarily infantry, with cavalry and chariots playing a supporting role. He advocated the policy of "using barbarians to attack barbarians," that is, incorporating surrendered Xiongnu horsemen into the Han military, a suggestion that was eventually adopted, especially with the establishment of dependent states of different nomads living on Han's frontiers. Like Jia Yi (201–168 BC), he was an early proponent of terminating the heqin marriage alliance and tribute treaty with the Xiongnu, although he opposed it for practical reasons rather than Jia's staunch ideological position that superior sedentary Chinese culture should dominate over the northern nomads. The heqin agreement was supposed to guarantee peace and stability between the Han and Xiongnu. Chao believed that the heqin agreement had been breached and ignored by the Xiongnu on so many occasions—with continuous raiding and plundering along Han's borders by Xiongnu tribe and clan leaders—that the treaty simply failed to live up to its goals and lost all practical use. It was not until after the Battle of Mayi (133 BC) during Emperor Wu's reign (141–87 BC) that the heqin treaty was finally abolished in favor of an offensive military strategy to break apart the Xiongnu Empire.

=== Views on Han and Xiongnu military tactics ===
In a memorandum entitled "Guard the Frontiers and Protect the Borders" that he presented to the throne in 169 BC, Chao compared the relative strengths of Xiongnu and Han battle tactics. In regards to the Han armies, Chao deemed the swift-riding Xiongnu horsemen better prepared for rough terrain due to better stallions, better with horseback archery, and were better able to withstand the elements and harsh climates than Chinese soldiers. However, he viewed Xiongnu cavalry inferior when faced with Han infantry and chariots on flat, level plains. He emphasized the superiority of Han iron armor and weapons over the Xiongnu's leather armor and wooden shields. He deemed the Chinese composite crossbow and repeating crossbow superior to the Xiongnu's composite bow. When dismounted, he believed that the Xiongnu, untrained in infantry tactics, would be decimated by Han infantry.

=== Frontier development and management ===
In his Rise of the Chinese Empire, historian Chun-shu Chang outlines the main points on frontier development embodied in Chao's "Guard the Frontiers and Protect the Borders" proposal of 169 BC. The following are excerpts from Chao's written memorandum (note: Xiongnu and other terms are spelled in Wade-Giles format). It is clear from historical records that Emperor Wen approved of Chao's proposal and immediately enlisted people for service on the northern frontier. Chao wrote:

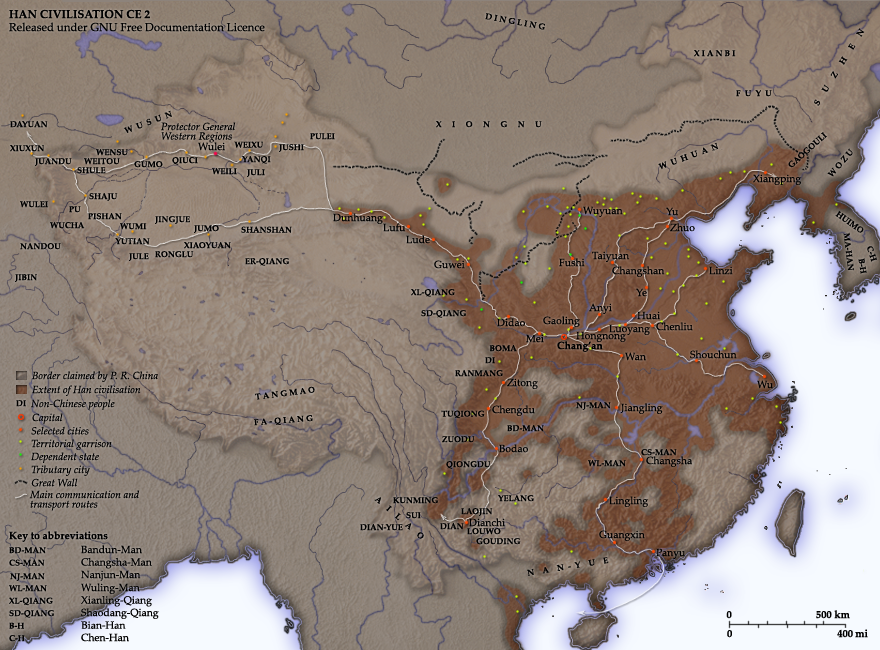
A map showing the Han Empire by 2 AD, which extended much further than in Chao's time, with frontier administrative units of the Hexi Corridor as far west as Dunhuang and with loyal tributary states located as far west as Dayuan, located in what is now the Fergana Valley of Uzbekistan, Kyrgyzstan and Tajikistan.

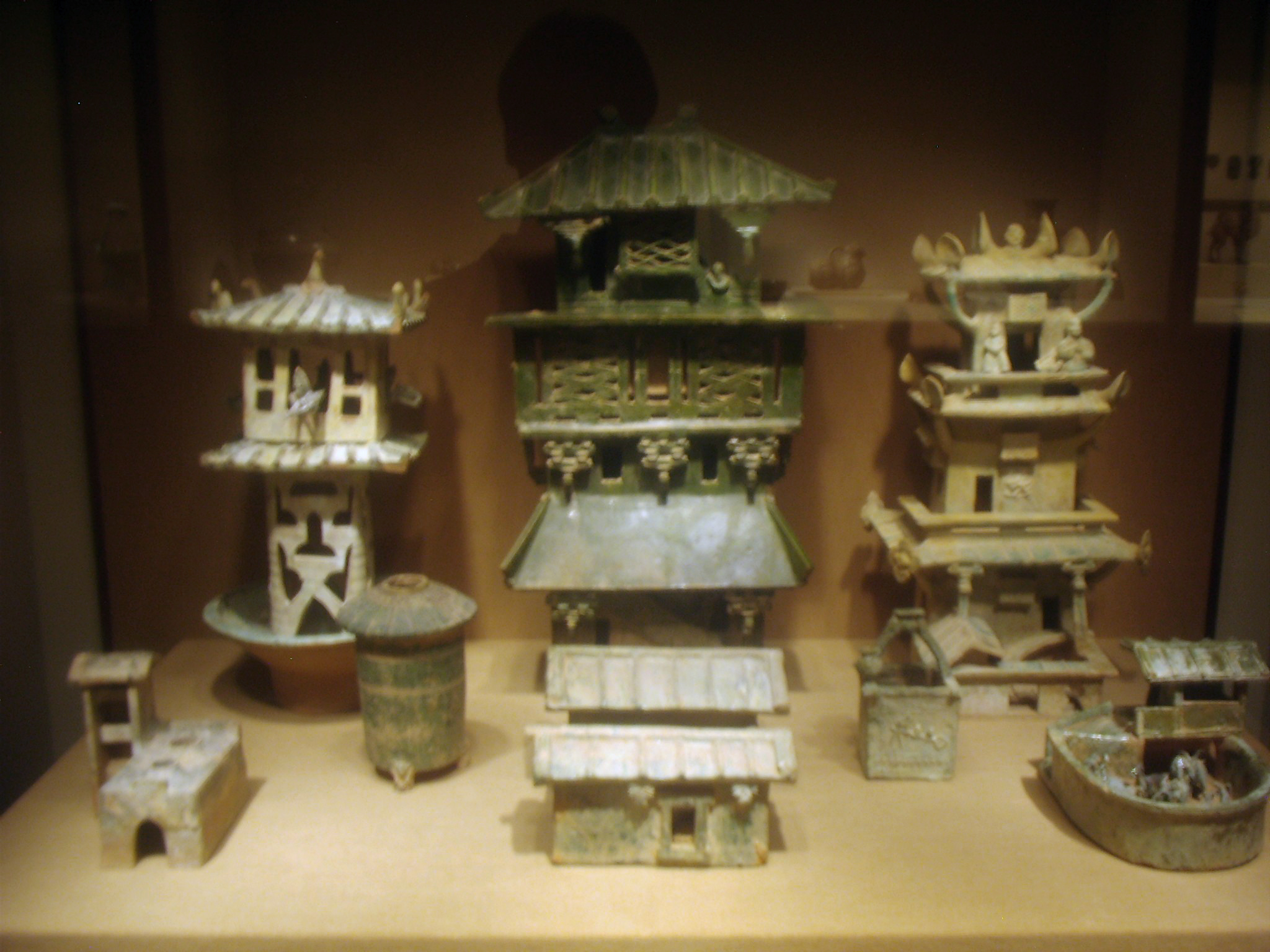
Eastern Han dynasty (22–220 AD) earthenware models of watchtowers (and other buildings), which would have been erected at watch stations and forts on Han China's frontiers.

It is necessary to settle permanent residents in border regions since expeditionary soldiers from other parts of the empire do not understand the character and capacities of the Hsiung-nu...The government will provide houses and land for the immigrants.

For the immigrants in such border areas, the government will construct walled cities, well protected by high walls, deep moats, catapults, and thorns. Each city, along strategic points and thoroughfares, will be designed to hold no fewer than one thousand households...Each walled city will have an inner wall and an outer wall 150 paces (about 209 meters) apart. Each residential area in the outer-wall area is to be surrounded by "sandy fields" (t'ien-t'ien, "heavenly fields") to detect the intrusion of enemies in the night (intruders will leave footprints in the fields).

The Government will construct houses and provide farming tools before the arrival of the migrants. It will also provide winter and summer clothing and food to the migrants until they become self-supporting...The government will buy mates for those migrants without husbands or wives, for without a mate a migrant will not remain contented on the frontier.

The government will reward anyone who stops a Hsiung-nu raid and will award him half of what he recovers from the enemy.

First enlist ordinary and pardoned convicts, then slaves given by their masters to purchase aristocratic ranks, and then all those commoners who desire to go. The government will reward them with ranks, and their families will be exempt from taxation and service requirements.

The government will build frontier communities that are rooted locally, tightly connected, mutually assisted, and militarily united against the "barbarians." This system will be much more efficacious than reliance on garrison soldiers from the interior.

Chao made some later amendments to his proposal, which Emperor Wen adopted as well. These included the following:

Frontier cities will be located close to water resources and an abundance of good arable land.

Houses will each have two bedrooms and one living room and be fully furnished with furniture and necessary appliances. Trees will be planted in the living area.

The government will hire doctors and shamans for each new frontier settlement to take care of the immigrants' medical and religious needs.

In organization, five families will comprise a wu, to be headed by a wu-chang (head of the five-family unit); ten wu will comprise a li (ward), to be headed by a chia-shih (ward head); four li comprise a lien (company), to be headed by a chia-wu-pai (head of five hundred); ten lien comprise an i (city), to be headed by a chia-hou (magistrate). Each leader will be selected from among the migrants who are most talented, able, and familiar with local conditions and who best understand the minds of the people.

All able men will receive military training in peacetime under their local unit leaders and will fight as groups under these leaders.

All migrants will be forbidden to leave their localities without government permission.

Chao's memorial to the throne had a major influence on later court policy under Emperor Wu after his officer Huo Qubing (140–117 BC) decimated Xiongnu forces inhabiting the Hexi Corridor. The Han then colonized this region that stretched from Lanzhou to the Jade Gate, a region which provided access to the Western Regions of the Tarim Basin and Central Asia.

=== Views on the merchant and peasant classes ===
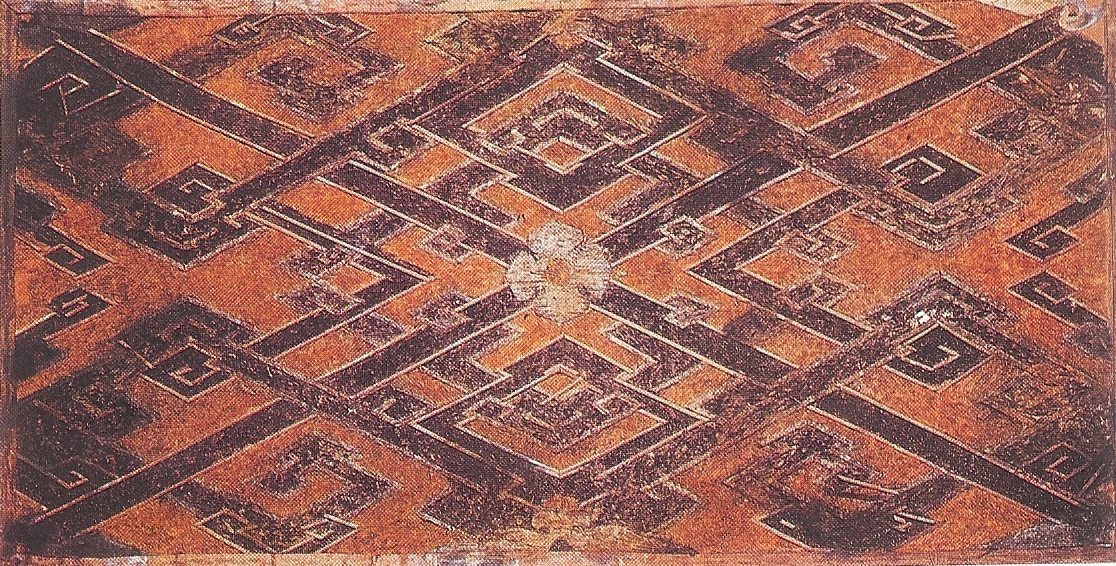
Woven silk textile from Tomb No. 1 at Mawangdui, Changsha, Hunan province, China, dated to the Western Han dynasty (2nd century BC); although Emperor Gaozu of Han (r. 202–195 BC) passed a law forbidding merchants to wear silk clothing or ride on horseback, this was flouted by the merchants who wore fine silk garments and rode in fancy carriages.

Like his fellow gentry, Chao Cuo viewed the peasants with concern and the merchant class with a certain level of contempt. In regards to the burden of heavy taxes and corvée duties imposed on farming peasants, Chao once pointed out that the average peasant family of five, including two adult males (old enough for labor service) would only be able to cultivate up to 100 mou (4.57 hectares or 11.3 acres) which produced roughly 100 shi (2,000 liters) of grain, yet during times of famine and drought the state's high taxes forced peasants to take high interest loans which led to debt, poverty, and new reliance on powerful landholding families. The historian Sima Qian (145–86 BC) noted in his Records of the Grand Historian (compiled 109 to 91 BC), successful merchants who became wealthy in trade often invested their capital in land, thus joining the elite landholding class. As Chao Cuo makes very clear, the government's anti-merchant policies of raising taxes hardly affected those with great wealth while excessive taxation of peasants drove them from their plot of land and allowed merchants to move in:

Nowadays in a farming family of five members at least two of them are required to render labor service. The area of their arable land is no more than one hundred mou [11.3 acres]; the yield from which does not exceed 100 shih [about 2,000 liters]. Farmers plough in spring, weed in summer, reap in autumn and store in winter; they cut undergrowth and wood for fuel and render labor services to the government. They cannot avoid wind and dust in spring, sultry heat in summer, dampness and rain in autumn and cold and ice in winter. Thus all year round they cannot afford to take even a day's rest. Furthermore they have to welcome guests on their arrival and see them off on their departure; they have to mourn for the dead and inquire after the sick. Besides they have to bring up infants. Although they work as hard as this they still have to bear the calamities of flood and drought. Sometimes taxes are collected quite unexpectedly; if the orders are issued in the morning they must be prepared to pay by the evening. To meet this demand farmers have to sell their possessions at half price, and those who are destitute have to borrow money at two hundred percent interest. Eventually they have to sell fields and dwellings, or sometimes sell even children and grandchildren into slavery in order to pay back the loan. On the other hand great merchants get profits of two hundred percent by hoarding stocks of commodities while the lesser ones sit in rows in the market stalls to buy and sell. They deal in superfluous luxuries and lead an easy life in the cities. Taking advantage of the urgent demands of the government, they sell commodities at a double price. Though they never engage in farming and their women neither tend silkworms nor weave, they always wear embroidered and multicolored clothes and always eat fine millet and meat. Without experiencing the farmers' sufferings, they make vast gains. Taking advantage of their riches, they associate with kings and marquises. Their power exceeds that of the official and they try to surpass each other in using their profits. They wander idly around roaming as far as a thousand li; there are so many of them that they form long lines on the roads. They ride in well-built carriages and whip up fat horses, wear shoes of silk and trail white silk [garments]. It is no wonder that the merchants take over farmers and farmers become vagrants drifting from one place to another.

Of this passage, the late Nishijima Sadao 西嶋定生 (1919–1999), professor emeritus at the University of Tokyo, wrote: "This indictment reveals striking contrasts between the lives of farmers and merchants in Former Han and shows that severe taxation merely impoverished the former and enriched the latter."

== Downfall ==
Chao helped orchestrate the central government's efforts to reduce in size and undermine the subordinate kingdoms in the Han Empire. When disaffected kings of seven different kingdoms plotted rebellion against central authority, Chao's political enemies at court (among them, Yuan Ang) used this as an excuse to persuade Emperor Jing to remove and eliminate Chao to appease these kings. Therefore, Emperor Jing had Chao executed in 154 BC. However, Emperor Jing soon realized the falsity of the claims of Chao's political enemies when the King of Wu, Liu Bi (ruling a semi-autonomous kingdom in northern Zhejiang and southern Jiangsu), and his monarchical allies made open revolt against the Emperor.
