= Liang =

Liang may refer to:

== Chinese history ==
- Liang (state) (梁) (8th century BC – 641 BC), a Spring and Autumn period state
- Wei (state) (403–225 BC), a Warring States period state, also known as Liang (梁) after moving its capital to Daliang
  - Kaifeng, a city formerly known as Daliang (大梁)
  - Liang (realm) (梁), a fief held by various princes under imperial China
- Liang (Han dynasty kingdom) (梁), a kingdom/principality in the Han dynasty
- Liang Province (涼州), an administrative division in ancient China covering present-day Gansu, Ningxia, and parts of Qinghai, Xinjiang, and Inner Mongolia
- Former Liang (涼) (320–376), one of the Sixteen Kingdoms
- Later Liang (Sixteen Kingdoms) (涼) (386–403), one of the Sixteen Kingdoms
- Southern Liang (Sixteen Kingdoms) (涼) (397–414), one of the Sixteen Kingdoms
- Northern Liang (涼) (397–439), one of the Sixteen Kingdoms
- Western Liang (Sixteen Kingdoms) (涼) (400–421), one of the Sixteen Kingdoms
- Liang dynasty (梁) (502–557), a state during the Southern and Northern Dynasties period, also known as Southern Liang
  - Western Liang (555–587), a puppet state during the Northern and Southern dynasties period
- Liang (梁) (617–621), a state founded by Xiao Xian at the end of the Sui dynasty
- Liang (梁) (617–628), a state founded by Liang Shidu at the end of the Sui dynasty
- Liang (涼) (618–619), a state founded by Li Gui at the end of the Sui dynasty
- Later Liang (Five Dynasties) (梁) (907–923), a state during the Five Dynasties and Ten Kingdoms period

== Other uses ==
- Liang Bua, a cave and archaeological site in Indonesia
- Mukim Liang, an administrative division of Belait District, Brunei
- Liang (surname) (梁), a Chinese surname
- Liang (mass), (Chinese: 兩), a traditional East Asian unit of weight
- Liang (currency), (Chinese: 兩), a traditional East Asian unit of currency
- Liang, a barangay in Malolos, Philippines
- Liang Island, Beigan Township, Lienchiang County (Matsu Islands), Taiwan (Republic of China)
