= Liang dynasty (disambiguation) =

Liang dynasty (502–557), also known as Southern Liang, was an imperial dynasty during the Southern and Northern Dynasties period.

Liang dynasty may also refer to:

- Former Liang (320–376), one of the Sixteen Kingdoms
- Later Liang (Sixteen Kingdoms) (386–403), one of the Sixteen Kingdoms
- Southern Liang (Sixteen Kingdoms) (397–414), one of the Sixteen Kingdoms
- Northern Liang (397–439), one of the Sixteen Kingdoms
- Western Liang (Sixteen Kingdoms) (400–421), one of the Sixteen Kingdoms
- Western Liang (555–587), a puppet state during the Northern and Southern dynasties period
- Later Liang (Five Dynasties) (907–923), one of the five dynasties that ruled northern China successively during the Five Dynasties and Ten Kingdoms period

== See also ==
- Liang (state) (8th century BC – 641 BC), a state during the Spring and Autumn period
- Wei (state) (403 BC – 225 BC), also known as Liang after moving its capital in 4th century BC
- Liang (disambiguation)
