= Liu Mai =

Prince of the Han dynasty

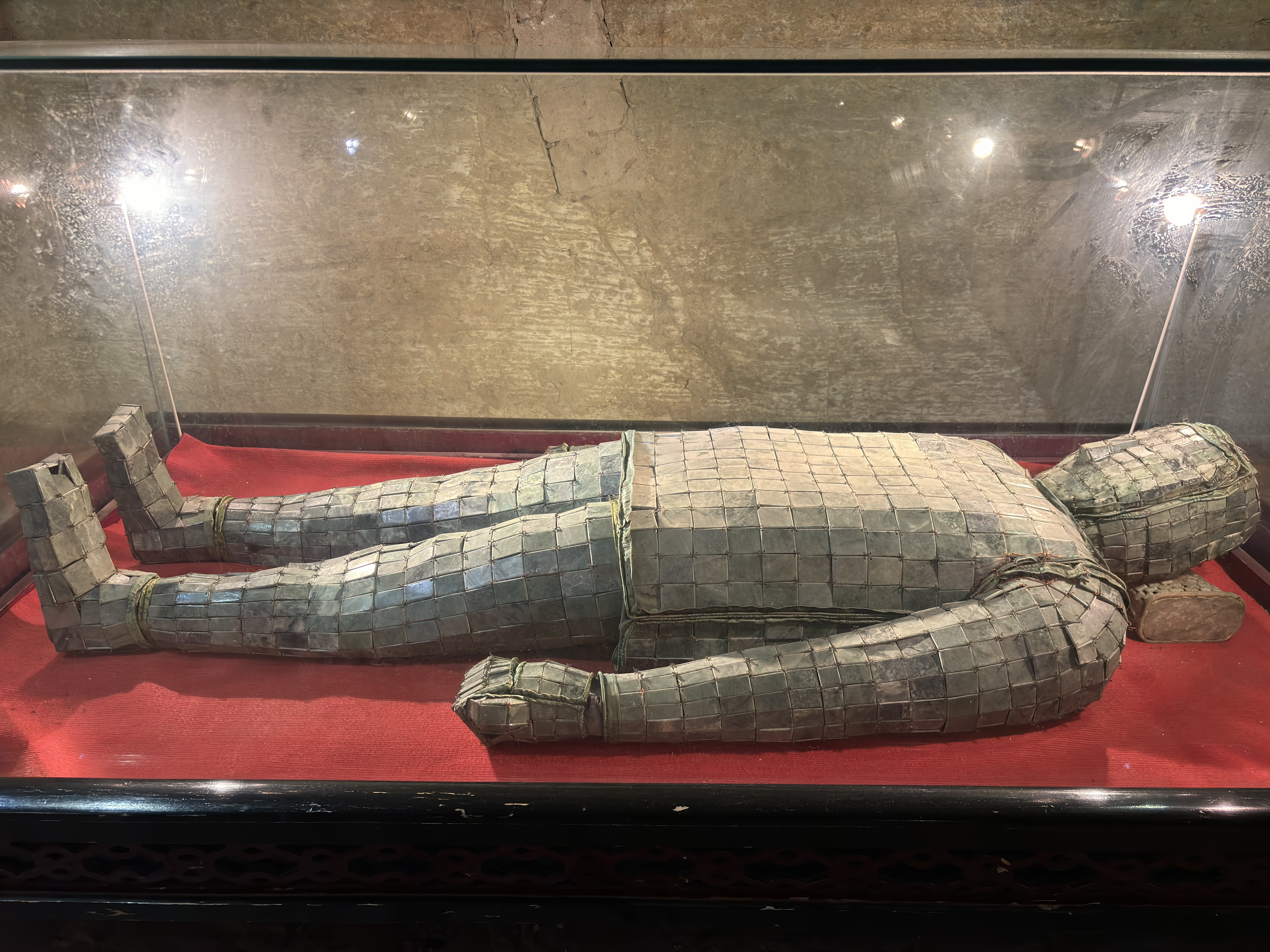

Liu Mai (Chinese: 劉買, Liú Mǎi), posthumously named Prince Gong of Liang (梁恭王, Liáng Gōngwàng), was a prince of the Han dynasty. He was the eldest son and heir of Liu Wu, prince of Liang. He did not receive all of his father's inheritance; instead, his uncle the emperor Jing divided the realm of Liang into five pieces. Liu Mai ruled his part of Liang from 144–137 BC. Liu Mai was married to Chen Taihou, and was succeeded by their son, Liu Xiang.

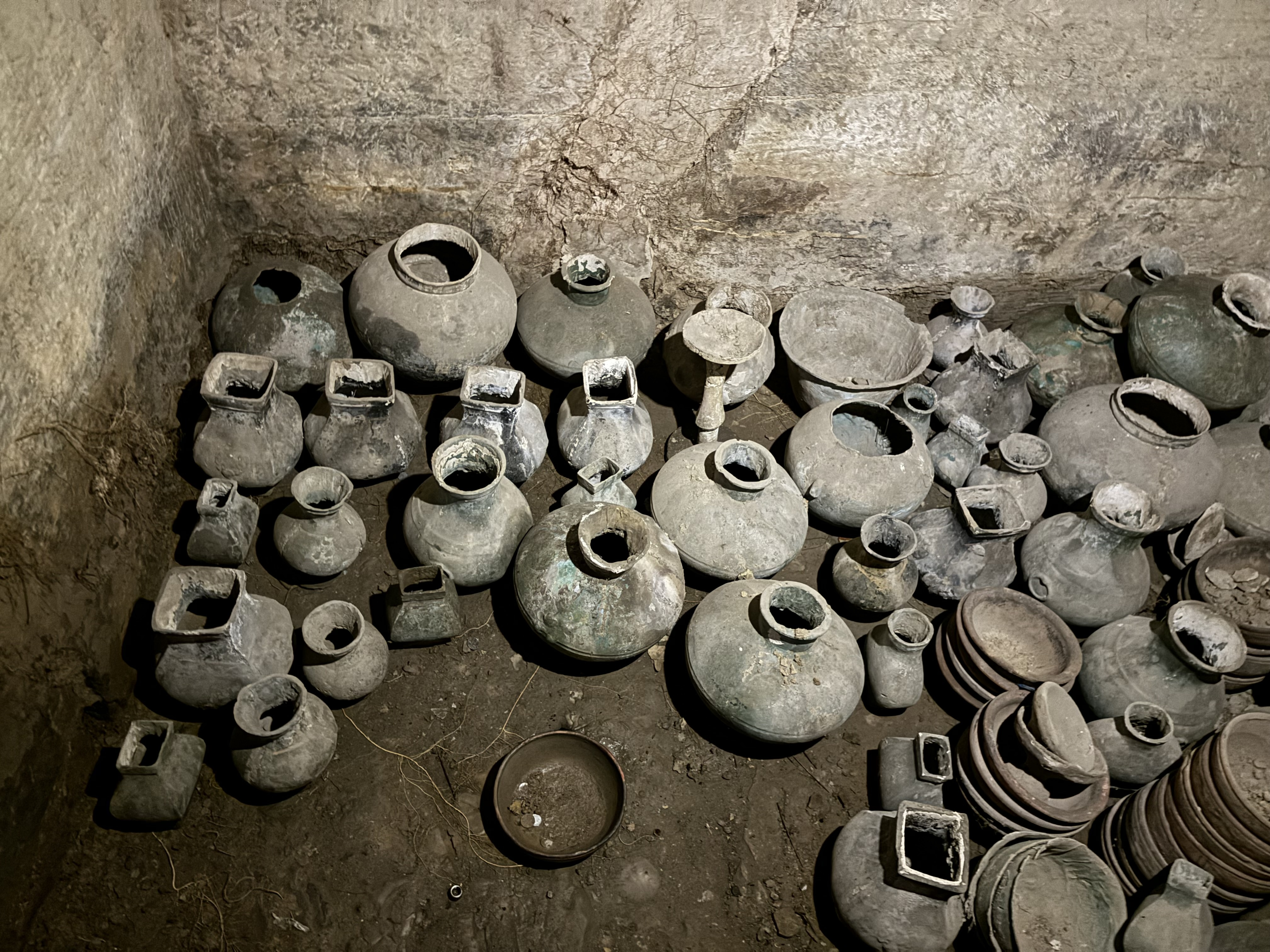
