= Liang Kingdom =

Historical Chinese kingdom

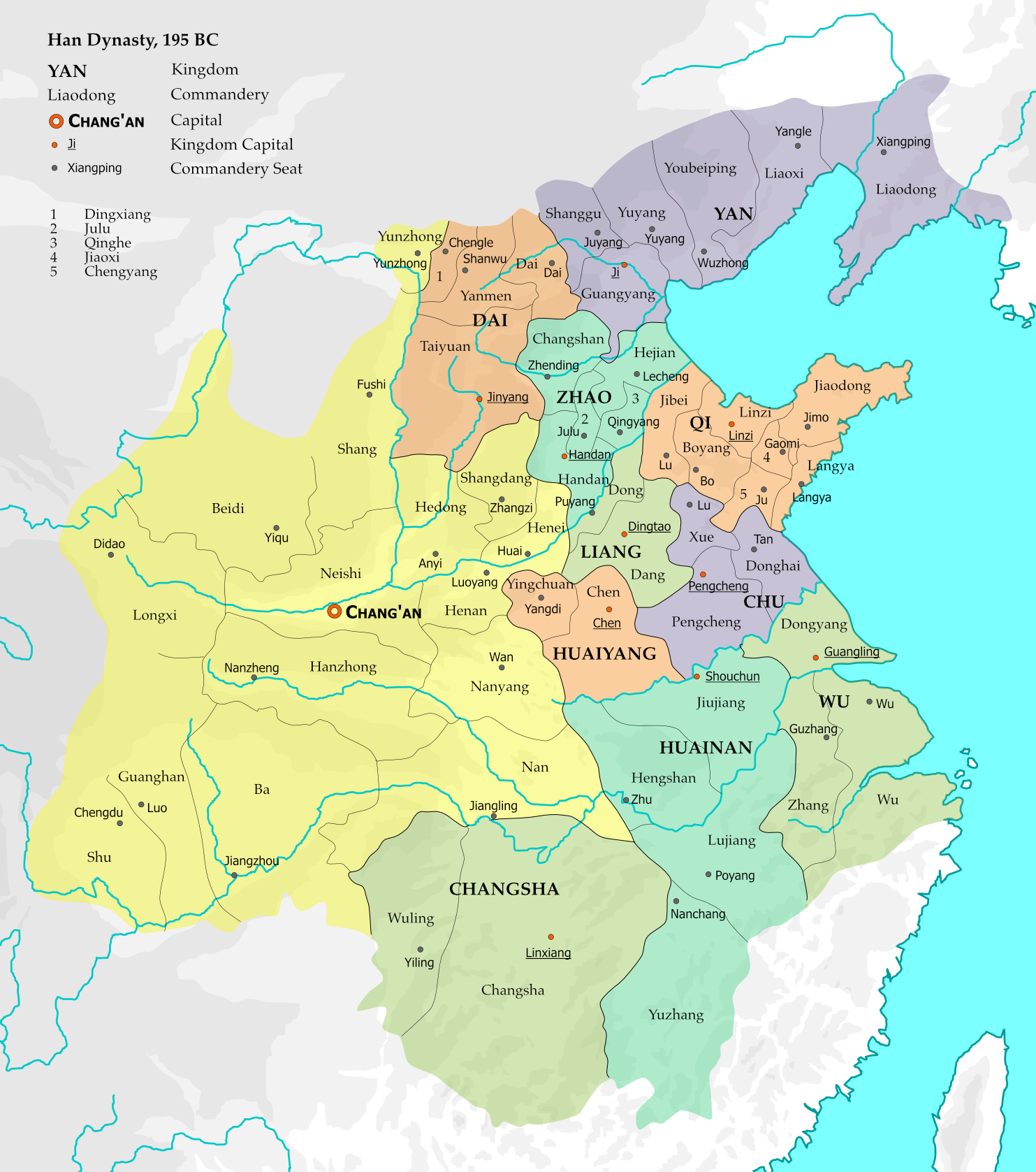
Kingdoms of the Han dynasty in 195 BC. Liang is shown in green on the center of the map

Liang (Chinese: 梁; pinyin: Liáng) was a kingdom/principality in the Chinese Han dynasty. Its territories were located within the modern Henan, Anhui and Shandong provinces.

== History ==
Shortly before the establishment of the Han dynasty, the Qin-era Dang Commandery (碭郡) was granted to Peng Yue by Liu Bang as the Kingdom of Liang, named after the synonymous kingdom of the Warring States period. Six years later, Peng was executed on a fabricated treason charge, and the kingdom was granted to Liu Hui (劉恢), a son of Liu Bang. Dong Commandery was then added to Liang's territory. In the seventh year of Empress Dowager Lü's reign, Hui was moved to Zhao, where he committed suicide soon after. The kingdom was granted to Lü Chan (呂產), a nephew of the empress dowager. In this period, Liang was briefly renamed Lü. During the Lü Clan Disturbance, Lü Chan was killed, and the kingdom's two component commanderies was restored.

Emperor Wen granted Liang to his fourth son Liu Yi (劉揖) in the second year of his reign. However, his fief included only Dang Commandery. Yi died 10 years later, and the kingdom passed to his brother, Wu (劉武). As the territories held by Emperor Wen's sons was much weaker than those held by other branches of the imperial family, part of Huaiyang, Wu's former fief, was added to Liang, increasing the number of counties in Liang to more than 40.

Liu Wu died in 144 BC during Emperor Jing's reign. After his death, Liang was divided into five principalities, namely Liang, Jichuan (濟川), Jidong (濟東), Shanyang (山陽) and Jiyin (濟陰). Its southeastern territories, centered around Suiyang (睢陽), retained the name Liang, and passed to Mai (劉買), Wu's eldest son. Liang's land was further reduced during Emperor Wu's reign. Liu Mai's descendants continued to hold the principality until the Xin dynasty, when it was converted to a commandery.

In 79 AD, Liang was granted to Liu Chang (劉暢), a son of the Emperor Ming, his fief being the former Liang territories and part of Chenliu Commandery (陳留郡). Chang's line held the principality until the end of the Han dynasty. Cao Wei established the Liang Commandery in its location.

== Territory and population ==
In 2 AD, Liang administered 8 counties: Dang (碭), Zi (甾), Zhuqiu (杼秋), Meng (蒙), Yishi (已氏), Yu (虞), Xiayi (下邑) and Suiyang (睢陽). The population was 106,752, or 38,709 households.

In 140 AD, Liang administered 9 counties: Xiayi, Suiyang, Yu, Dangshan (碭山), Meng, Gushu (穀熟), Yan (焉), Ningling (寧陵) and Bo (薄). The population was 431,283, or 83,300 households.

== Princes ==
- Peng Yue, 202 BC – 196 BC;
- Liu Hui (劉恢), Prince Gong of Zhao (趙共王), 196 BC – 181 BC;
- Lü Chan (呂產), 181 BC – 180 BC;
- Liu Yi (劉揖), Prince Huai (懷) of Liang, 179 BC – 169 BC;
- Liu Wu (劉武), Prince Xiao (孝) of Liang, 169 BC – 144 BC;
- Liu Mai (劉買), Prince Gong (恭) of Liang, 144 BC – 137 BC;
- Liu Xiang (劉襄), Prince Ping (平) of Liang, 137 BC – 97 BC;
- Liu Wushang (劉毋傷), Prince Zhen (貞) of Liang, 97 BC – 86 BC;
- Liu Dingguo (劉定國), Prince Jing (敬) of Liang, 86 BC – 46 BC;
- Liu Sui (劉遂), Prince Yi (夷) of Liang, 46 BC – 40 BC;
- Liu Jia (劉嘉), Prince Huang (荒) of Liang, 40 BC – 25 BC;
- Liu Li (劉立), 25 BC – 3 AD;
- Liu Shao (劉紹), 5 – 10;
- Liu Chang (劉暢), Prince Jie (節) of Liang, 79 – 99;
- Liu Jian (劉堅), Prince Gong (恭) of Liang, 99 – 125;
- Liu Kuang (劉匡), Prince Huai (懷) of Liang, 125 – 136;
- Liu Cheng (劉成), Prince Yi (夷) of Liang, 136 – 165;
- Liu Yuan (劉元), Prince Jing (敬) of Liang, 165 – 181;
- Liu Mi (劉彌), 181 – 221.

== See also ==
- Liang (realm)
