= Usurpation of Qi by Tian =

Deposition of Jiang clan as rulers of state of Qi

The usurpation of Qi by Tian (Chinese: 田氏代齊) was the deposition of the Jiang (姜) clan as rulers of the state of Qi, and their replacement by members of the Tian (田) clan. That occurred as a series of events between 481 and 379 BCE through which the Tian clan cemented its position as the leading family in Qi.

The final acts of the usurpation (391–379 BCE), in conjunction with the Partition of Jin (453 BCE or 403 BCE), mark the transition from the Spring and Autumn period to the Warring States period.

The Tian clan continued to use the name "Qi" for its realm after the usurpation. For historiographical purposes, pre-usurpation Qi is referred to as "Jiang Qi" (姜齊), and post-usurpation Qi is referred to as "Tian Qi" (田齊).

== Background ==
Qi was originally ruled by the Jiang clan, the descendants of Jiang Ziya. In 672 BCE, Prince Chen Wan of the State of Chen fled to Qi following political unrest in his native state and became the progenitor of the Chen clan of Qi, which was later known as Tian. By 545 BCE, the Tian clan was one of the strongest families in Qi. Tian Huanzi, in conjunction with other prominent families, eliminated the Qing clan (慶氏), the Luan clan (欒氏), and the Gao clan (高氏).

At the same time, the Tian clan also sought the support of the minor Qi aristocrats and the Qi populace. Tian Huanzi granted fiefdoms to the Qi aristocrats who were not granted lands and took steps to demonstrate his charity by providing food relief to the poor. His successor, Tian Xizi, garnered additional support through providing low-interest loans to the peasants. At the same time, the Dukes of Qi were seen as venal and corrupt and so support for the Tian clan thus gradually overshadowed support for the Jiang clan.

== Usurpation ==
In 489 BCE, Duke Jing of Qi died. The major cadet branches of the Jiang clan, the Guo clan (國氏) and the Gao clan (高氏) supported the accession of Prince Tu to the throne. On the other hand, Tian Xizi supported Prince Yangsheng, expelled the Guo and Gao clans and then installed Yangsheng on the throne as Duke Dao of Qi, with Tian Xizi himself as Prime Minister. Then, the Tian clan's status was paramount in Qi.

In 481 BCE, Tian Xizi's successor Tian Chengzi killed Duke Jian of Qi (and possibly also his father Duke Dao of Qi in 485 BCE), as well as numerous members of the Jiang clan. He then installed Duke Jian's brother, Duke Ping of Qi to the throne. Then, the Tian clan became the de facto rulers of Qi.

In 391 BCE, Tian Xizi's great-great-grandson Tian He deposed Duke Kang of Qi. However, Tian He did not install a new leader this time; Qi therefore was in interregnum between 391 and 386 BCE.

In 386 BCE, Tian He exiled the former Duke Kang onto a small island in the sea and declared himself Duke. In the same year, the Zhou court formally recognized Tian He's new position as Duke and legitimized the rule of the Tian clan over Qi.

In 379 BCE, the former Duke Kang died, thus ending a line that stretched back to the beginning of the Zhou dynasty. The Tian clan's hold on Qi would continue until the state was conquered by Qin in 221 BCE.
