= Duke Huan of Tian Qi =

Duke Huan of Tian Qi 田齊桓公

Ruler of Qi
- Reign: 374–357 BC
- Predecessor: Tian Yan
- Successor: King Wei of Qi
- Born: 400 BC
- Died: 357 BC (aged 43)
- Issue: King Wei of Qi
Names
- Ancestral name: Guī (媯); Clan name: Tián (田); Given name: Wǔ (午)
Posthumous name
- Duke Xiaowu Huan (孝武桓公)
- House: Gui
- Dynasty: Tian Qi
- Father: Duke Tai of Tian Qi
- Mother: Consort Xiao (孝大妃)

Duke Huan of Tian Qi (Chinese: 田齊桓公; pinyin: Tián Qí Huán Gōng), personal name Tian Wu, was the third monarch of the Tian Qi state, reigning from 374 BC to 357 BC.

== Reign ==
Duke Huan was born in 400 BC, during the reign of Duke Kang, the last Qi ruler from the House of Jiang. In 386 BC Duke Kang was deposed by Duke Huan's father Duke Tai of Tian Qi, the first Qi ruler from the House of Tian. Duke Tai died in 384 BC and was succeeded by his son Tian Yan, Duke Huan's elder brother. In 375 BC Duke Huan murdered Tian Yan and his son Tian Xi, and usurped the throne.

Duke Huan ruled through a period of war and instability. In the first five years of his reign, Qi was invaded by the states of Lu, Wei, Wey, and Zhao on separate occasions. And besides murdering his brother and nephew, the Bamboo Annals also records that he killed his mother in the 11th year of his reign. Although his grandson King Xuan is generally credited with the establishment of the Jixia Academy, other Chinese sources trace it to Duke Huan.

Duke Huan reigned for 18 years and died in 357 BC, at the age of 43. He was succeeded by his son Tian Yinqi, under whose reign Qi would become the most powerful state of China. Yinqi would also be the first ruler to declare himself King of Qi, and is posthumously known as King Wei of Qi.

== Mausoleum ==
Duke Huan's mausoleum is located on the Dingzu Mountain (鼎足山) near Qiling Town, in Linzi District of Zibo, Shandong, near the ancient Qi capital Linzi. There are two hill-like tombs built on the same platform. Together they measure 190 metres (620 ft) from north to south, 320 metres (1,050 ft) from east to west, and 30 metres (98 ft) high. The area is called Two Kings' Cemetery (二王冢), and had been for 2,000 years thought to be the tombs of earlier Duke Huan of Qi and Duke Jing of Qi. However, archaeologists have concluded that they are in fact the tombs of Duke Huan of Tian Qi and Yan, Duke of Qi, the brother he had murdered.

All seven known mausoleums of Tian Qi rulers are now protected as a National Historical and Cultural Site. Since 2008 they have been included in the tentative list of UNESCO World Heritage Sites as part of the ancient Qi capital and mausoleum complex.

== Family ==
Sons:

- Prince Yinqi (公子因齊; 378–320 BC), ruled as King Wei of Qi from 356–320 BC

Duke Huan of Tian Qi House of Tian Born: 400 BC Died: 357 BC
Regnal titles
| Preceded by Yan, Duke of Qi | Ruler of Qi; 374–357 BC | Succeeded by King Wei of Qi |
