= Xuan of Qi =

Xuan of Qi may refer to:

- Duke Xuan of Qi (died 405 BC)
- King Xuan of Qi (died 301 BC)
