= Prince of Qi =

Prince or King of Qi (Chinese: 齊王) may refer to:

== Zhou dynasty ==
King of Qi state

- King Wei of Qi, ruled 356 – 320 BC
- King Xuan of Qi, ruled 319 – 301 BC
- King Min of Qi, ruled 300 – 283 BC

== Han dynasty ==
- Han Xin, (203 BC – 202 BC) a military commander served under Liu Bang.
- Liu Fei, (202 BC – 189 BC), eldest son of Emperor Gaozu of Han.
- Liu Xiang, (189 BC –179 BC) a key figure during the Lü Clan Disturbance.

== Wei and Jin dynasties ==
- Cao Fang, demoted to Prince of Qi after losing Emperor title.
- Sima You, second son of Sima Zhao.
- Sima Jiong, one of the princes in War of the Eight Princes.

== Southern and Northern Dynasties ==
- Emperor Wenxuan of Northern Qi, held the title Prince of Qi before becoming Emperor.
- Yuwen Xian, fifth son of Yuwen Tai.
- Emperor Gao of Southern Qi, held the title Prince of Qi before becoming Emperor.

== Sui dynasty ==
- Yang Jian (Sui prince), second son of Emperor Yang of Sui.

== Tang dynasty ==
- Li Yuanji, youngest son of Li Yuan that died during the Incident at Xuanwu Gate.
- Li Yu (Chinese: 李祐), fifth son of Emperor Taizong of Tang.

== Five Dynasties and Ten Kingdoms Period ==
- Emperor Yuanzong of Southern Tang, held the title Prince of Qi before becoming Emperor.
- Shi Chonggui, held the title Prince of Qi before becoming Emperor.
- Han Tejang (Chinese: 韓德讓), a chancellor for the Liao dynasty.

== Song dynasty ==
- Zhao Tingmei (Chinese: 趙廷美), fourth brother of Emperor Taizu of Song.

== Yuan dynasty ==
- Shiremun, son of Ogedei khan. Death at 1258.
- Babusha (Qi wang). descent of Khasar, April 5 1307 seal.
- Yulong temur, son of Babusha descent of Khasar, 1316-1326.
- Yuelutemur, son of Yulong temur. He had inherited Qi wang's seal. From to August 25 1326 between February 5 1329.
- Köke Temür, Bayad Mongol general that served under Ukhaantu Khan. He was son of Sayinchi Dahu, lord of Bayad Mongols.

== Ming dynasty ==
- Zhu Pu (Chinese: 朱榑), seventh son of Hongwu Emperor.

== See also ==
- Qi (Shandong)
- Qiwang (disambiguation)
