= Yan, Marquis of Tian =

Ruler of the Chinese state of Qi from 383 to 375 BC

Tian Yan 田剡

Ruler of Qi
- Reign: 383–375 BC
- Predecessor: Duke Tai of Tian Qi
- Successor: Duke Huan of Tian Qi
- Died: 375 BC
Names
- Ancestral name: Guī (媯); Clan name: Tián (田); Given name: Yǎn (剡)
- House: Gui
- Dynasty: Tian Qi
- Father: Duke Tai of Tian Qi

Tian Yan, commonly known as "Yan, Marquis of Qi" (Chinese: 齊侯剡; pinyin: Qí Hóu Yǎn) or "Yan, Marquis of Tian" (Chinese: 田侯剡; pinyin: Tián Hóu Yǎn), was the second monarch of the Tian Qi state from 383 BC to 375 BC. He succeeded his father, the founding monarch of the Tian Qi (田齊) dynasty, Duke Tai of Tian Qi. He was killed by his younger brother, Duke Huan of Tian Qi, who then took the throne.

== Reign ==
Yan's father was Duke Tai of Tian Qi, the first Qi ruler from the House of Tian. Although leaders of the Tian clan had been de facto rulers of Qi since 481 BC, it wasn't until 386 BC that Duke Tai was formally recognized as ruler of Qi by King An of Zhou, the nominal king of all China. Duke Tai ascended the throne and exiled Duke Kang of Qi, the last Qi ruler from the House of Jiang, to a seaside city. Duke Tai died two years later and was succeeded by Yan. Duke Kang died in 379 BC.

In 378 BC the states of Han, Zhao, and Wei invaded Qi and attacked the city of Lingqiu (in present-day Gaotang County, Shandong Province). In 375 BC Yan was murdered by his younger brother Tian Wu, who usurped the throne and became known as Duke Huan of Tian Qi. Yan's son Tian Xi was also killed.

== Historical records ==
Because of the lack of reliable records during the Warring States period, the chapter on the House of Tian in Sima Qian's influential Shiji is unreliable and error-prone. Yan's reign was completely omitted from the Shiji, and he remained largely unknown until the discovery of the Bamboo Annals in 281 AD during the Jin dynasty.

== Mausoleum ==
Yan's mausoleum is located on the Dingzu Mountain (鼎足山) near Qiling Town, in Linzi District of Zibo, Shandong, near the ancient Qi capital Linzi. There are two hill-like tombs built on the same platform. Together they measure 190 metres (620 ft) from north to south, 320 metres (1,050 ft) from east to west, and 30 metres (98 ft) high. The area is called Two Kings' Cemetery (二王冢), and had been for 2,000 years thought to be the tombs of Duke Huan of Qi and Duke Jing of Qi. However, archaeologists have concluded that they are in fact the tombs of Yan and his brother and murderer, Duke Huan of Tian Qi.

All seven known mausoleums of Tian Qi rulers are now protected as a National Historical and Cultural Site. Since 2008 they have been included in the tentative list of UNESCO World Heritage Sites as part of the ancient Qi capital and mausoleum complex.

== Family ==
Sons:

- Youngest son, Prince Xi (公子喜; d. 375 BC)

Yan, Marquis of Tian House of Tian Died: 375 BC
Regnal titles
Preceded by Duke Tai of Tian Qi	Ruler of Qi; 383–375 BC	Succeeded by Duke Huan of Tian Qi
