= Chunyu Kun =

Chunyu Kun (Chinese: 淳于髡; pinyin: Chúnyú Kūn; Wade–Giles: Ch'un^{2}-yü^{2} K'un^{1}, variant: Shun-yü K'wan) (4th century BC) was a wit, Confucian philosopher, emissary, and official during the Chinese Warring States period. He was a contemporary and colleague of Mencius.

In the Records of the Grand Historian, Chunyu Kun appears in Linzi, the capital of the northern state of Qi, as an adviser to the chief minister under King Wei of Qi, and as a master scholar at the Jixia Academy, the foremost institution of learning in ancient China. He is said to be "a man of Qi who lived with his wife's family. He was less than five feet tall. Thanks to his wit and his ready tongue he was sent several times as an envoy to other states and was never worsted in argument." He is discussed in the chapter called "Jesters" (ch. 126, Guji liezhuan 滑稽列傳).

"There is widespread agreement that the Yanzi Chunqiu (晏子春秋; The Spring and Autumn Annals of Minister Yan Ying) was an anthology of the writings of Jixia scholars. It is quite probable that it was composed by followers of Chunyu Kun."

There are several famous stories about Chunyu Kun. In a rhetorical argument with Mencius, he tried to get Mencius to say that, because men and women should never touch each other, it was wrong to save one's sister-in-law from drowning. Mencius replied that someone who would not rescue the woman is a wolf. Kun said, "'The whole kingdom is drowning. How strange it is that you will not rescue it!' Mencius answered, 'A drowning kingdom must be rescued with right principles, as a drowning sister-in-law has to be rescued with the hand. Do you wish me to rescue the kingdom with my hand?'"

Chunyu Kun was so influential with the king of Qi that he was able to present scholars for promotion and introduce foreign advisers to the king. He was "a Qi nobleman famous for his erudition."

Chunyu Kun was also at the origin of the four-character idiom 送客留髡 (sòngkè liúkūn), which means "sending off the guests, Kun is left behind." This means "getting lucky" and refers to his joke that he would drink a single cup of wine with the emperor, but a cask if he was with courtesans and had sent off all the other guests.

In the Records of the Grand Historian, Sima Qian describes an incident in which Chunyu Kun's quick wit allowed him to advise his ruler to change his foolish command without getting in trouble himself.

The powerful nation of Chu was sending a large army against Qi. The king of Qi gave Chunyu Kun a hundred catties of gold and ten four-horse carriages, and told him to go to the neighboring state of Zhao to ask for help.

"Chunyu Kun threw back his head and laughed so hard that the cord of his hat snapped."

The king asked if he thought it was too little, and Chunyu Kun said, "How dare I?"

"Then why are you laughing?"

Chunyu Kun replied, "I saw... a man praying for a good harvest and offering one pig's trotter and one cup of wine. 'May the crops from the highland fill whole crates!' he prayed. 'May the crops from the lowland fill whole carts! May grain harvested in abundance fill my house!' He offered so little but expected so much in return. That is why I laughed."

The king then gave him "one thousand yi of gold, ten pairs of white jade discs and a hundred four-horse carriages." Chunyu Kun took them and successfully arranged military aid from Zhao, which forced the troops of Chu to return home.
