= Wu yen =

2001 Hong Kong film by Johnnie To and Wai Ka-fai

Wu Yen
- DVD cover
- Directed by: Johnnie To; Wai Ka-Fai
- Written by: Wai Ka-Fai; Yau Nai-Hoi; Ben Wong
- Produced by: Johnnie To; Wai Ka-Fai
- Starring: Anita Mui; Sammi Cheng; Cecilia Cheung
- Cinematography: Cheng Siu-Keung
- Edited by: Law Wing-Cheong; Wong Wing-Ming
- Music by: Raymond Wong
- Production companies: One Hundred Years of Film; Milkyway Image
- Distributed by: China Star Entertainment Group
- Release date: 18 January 2001
- Running time: 123 minutes
- Country: Hong Kong
- Language: Cantonese
- Box office: HK$27,241,316

Wu Yen (Chinese: 鍾無艷) is a 2001 historical Hong Kong comedy film produced and directed by Johnnie To and Wai Ka-Fai. It stars Anita Mui, Sammi Cheng, and Cecilia Cheung.

It was nominated for three categories at the 21st Hong Kong Film Awards.

== Plot ==
Village chief and formidable warrior Chung Wu Yen is destined to marry the incompetent King Xuan of Qi. When a mischievous, bigender fox spirit falls for Wu Yen, she's cursed with a red scar on her face. To keep Wu Yen for himself, the fox spirit turns into a beautiful maiden and seduces the king, causing him to retract the marriage proposal.

Persistent on their foretold union, Wu Yen pressures King Xuan to take her as his queen. He reluctantly agrees, on the condition that his new favourite maiden becomes queen too. The maiden then seemingly dies from an accident, and the king blames Wu Yen and throws her in jail. During her imprisonment, King Xuan's ancestor, Duke Huan of Qi, tricks her into believing that the ugly scar on the face will disappear if she devotes herself to the king unconditionally, when the opposite is true. Even though the king subsequently treats her badly, she dedicates herself to helping the king when she's needed, such as fighting his wars, and winning a sports competition against six other neighbouring states.

King Xuan marries a new maiden, Yingchun, who is the fox spirit in disguise. Wu Yen pleads with Duke Huan to remove her scar for her wedding night, and King Xuan consummates their marriage when he sees Wu Yen's scarless face. He changes his feelings again when the scar reappears the next morning.

The fox spirit comes up with a new scheme after persistent rejection from Wu Yen. She convinces King Xuan to dress in women's clothes in order to spy on Wu Yen, whom she accuses of infidelity. King Xuan confirms the deed when he sees Wu Yen talking to the fox spirit in male form. Before he could return to his chambers, Ng Hei, a disgruntled soldier that he imprisoned, attacks the group, but King Xuan, still appearing as a woman, talks him down.

Yingchun manages to anger the six kings of the neighbouring states. While Wu Yen fights in the frontline to protect the country, King Xuan gathers the six kings for a game of mahjong to talk peace. The game ends with King Xuan losing most of his assets and a number of his states, along with Wu Yen. Heartbroken by the king's actions, Wu Yen divorces him and returns to her village. Yingchun, feeling remorse from her schemes, reveals her true nature to the king, and leaves too.

With both women out of his life, King Xuan is left alone without his loyal advisors, who abandoned him after the divorce. Ng Hei amasses a small army to overthrow the king. With no one left to defend him, he dresses up as a woman again and escapes the palace. At his lowest, he begins to understand the wrongs in his actions, and realises his feelings for Wu Yen, regardless of her looks.

At the village, the six kings compete for Wu Yen's hand in marriage. King Xuan shows up and apologises to Wu Yen, then declares his love for her. The fox spirit intervenes, and wins the contest. Wu Yen accepts her fate, but the fox spirit turns into a woman whenever he tries to kiss his new bride. They realise they are both pregnant.

When King Xuan is kidnapped by Ng Hei, both women and the advisors rush to rescue him at the palace. Unable to calm Ng Hei down, King Xuan reveals that his majesty was the maiden whom he fell in love with the other night. Ng Hei backs down, and King Xuan makes him his new general.

Tired of being loved only when she's needed, Wu Yen tries to leave the palace, but is stopped by an invisible force. Duke Huan appears as the matchmaking deity, and reveals that he has tied a red thread of fate around their ankles, binding all three of them.

== Cast and roles ==
- Anita Mui as King Xuan (King Xuan of Qi)/King Xuan's Ancestor (Duke Huan of Qi)
- Sammi Cheng as Chung Wu Yen (Zhongli Chun)
- Cecilia Cheung as Fox spirit/Xia Yingchun
- Ai Wai as Emperor of Yen
- Joe Cheng as Emperor of An
- Chun Wong as Emperor of Qin
- Hui Shiu Hung as Emperor of Chu
- Lam Suet as Prime Minister An
- Lung Tin Sang as Historian
- Siu Leung as Envoy from the state of Yen
- Wang Tian-lin (credited as Tin Lam Wong)
- Raymond Wong Ho-Yin as Ng Hei
- Wong Man-Wai as Earth deity

== Cultural references ==
The line '有事鍾無艷，無事夏迎春' from the film is often used to describe situations where one seeks out their friends only when they need them, and neglects them otherwise. The idiom's origins can be traced back to folktales of King Xuan and his portrayal of only reaching out to his consort Zhongli Chun for important matters, and his concubine Xia Yingchun at other times.

== Awards ==
| Award | Date of ceremony | Category | Nominee | Result |
|---|---|---|---|---|
| 21st Hong Kong Film Awards | 21 April 2002 | Best Actress | Sammi Cheng | Nominated |
| 21st Hong Kong Film Awards | 21 April 2002 | Best Art Direction | Bruce Yu | Nominated |
| 21st Hong Kong Film Awards | 21 April 2002 | Best Costume and Makeup | Bruce Yu | Nominated |
| 8th Hong Kong Film Critics Society Awards | 25 February 2002 | Best Actress | Sammi Cheng | Won |

== Reviews ==
Derek Elley writing for Variety remarked that the film leans heavily on the performance of its three female leads, and that the travesty-style comedy "...was a sizeable local hit in early 2001, but has no Western market outside fests."

== Notes ==
The film borrows elements from, especially the nine-tailed fox character, and shares the same name as the TVB Jade drama The Legend of Lady Chung (1985).

It also shares the same name as the song by Hong Kong singer Kay Tse in her album 3/8, released in 2007, which has no relation to the film.
