= Xunzi =

Xunzi may refer to:

- Xunzi (book) (荀子), an ancient Chinese collection of philosophical writings attributed to the below figure
- Xunzi (philosopher), a 3rd-century BC philosopher and teacher, born Xun Kuang (荀況), to whom the Xunzi is traditionally attributed
