= Zihui (congshu) =

Ming dynasty collectaneum

Zihui (simplified Chinese: 子汇; traditional Chinese: 子彙; Wade–Giles: Tzu-hui) is the title of a Chinese book series (congshu). The anthology of (minor) philosophers was edited and printed during the Ming dynasty by Zhou Ziyi 周子義 (1529–1586) and others and comprises 24 works.

The collection brings together writings from various philosophical schools dating from the Warring States period to the Tang dynasty. It includes one work each from the Legalist school, the School of Diplomacy (Zonghengjia), and Mohism; seven works of Confucianism, nine of Daoism, three of the School of Names, and two of the Eclectic school. The printed texts survive partly as complete editions and partly as compilations.

The Hanyu da zidian (HYDZD), for example, makes use of the Zihui editions of the Wunengzi 无能子 and the Zi Huazi 子华子.

== Overview ==
The following works are contained (following Chinaknowledge):

- Yuzi 鬻子 1 juan; (Zhou) Yu Xiong 鬻熊; (Tang) Feng Xinggui 逄行珪 (comm.)
- Yanzi chunqiu neipian 晏子春秋內篇 2 juan; (Zhou) Yan Ying 晏嬰; (Ming) Zhou Ziyi 周子義 (comm.)
- Kongcongzi 孔叢子 3 juan; (Han) Kong Fu 孔鮒
- Jiazi Xinshu 賈子新書 2 juan; (Han) Jia Yi 賈誼
- Luzi (Xinyu) 陸子（新語）1 juan; (Han) Lu Jia 陸賈
- Xiao Xunzi (Shenjian) 小荀子（申鑒）1 juan; (Han) Shen Yue 荀悅
- Lumenzi 鹿門子 1 juan; (Tang) Pi Rixiu 皮日休
- Wenzi 文子 2 juan; (Zhou) Xin Jian 辛銒
- Guanyinzi 關尹子 1 juan; (Zhou) Yin Xi 尹喜
- Kangcangzi 亢倉子 1 juan; (Zhou) Gengsang Chu 庚桑楚
- Heguanzi 鶡冠子（鶴冠子）1 juan; (Song) Lu Dian 陸佃 (comm.)
- Huangshi Gong sushu 黃石公素書 1 juan; (Han) Huangshi Gong 黃石公
- Tianyinzi 天隱子 1 juan; (Tang) Sima Chengzhen 司馬承禎
- Xuanzhenzi waipian 玄真子外篇 1 juan; (Tang) Zhang Zhihe 張志和
- Wunengzi 無能子 3 juan; (Tang) NN
- Qiqiuzi (Tanzi Huashu / Huashu) 齊丘子（譚子化書）1 juan; (Southern Tang) Tan Qiao 譚峭
- Dengxizi 鄧析子 1 juan; (Zhou) Deng Xi 鄧析
- Yinwenzi 尹文子 1 juan; (Zhou) Yin Wen 尹文
- Gongsun Longzi 公孫龍子 1 juan; (Zhou) Gongsun Long 公孫龍; (Song) Xie Xishen 謝希深 (comm.)
- Shenzi 慎子 1 juan; (Zhou) Shen Dao 慎到
- Guiguzi 鬼谷子 1 juan; Waipian 外篇 1 juan; (NN)
- Mozi 墨子 1 juan; (Zhou) Mo Di 墨翟
- Zihuazi 子華子 1 juan; (Zhou) Cheng Ben 程本
- Liuzi 劉子 2 juan; (Northern Qi) Liu Zhou 劉晝; (Tang) Yuan Xiaozheng 袁孝政 (comm.)

== Bibliography ==
- Li Xueqin, Lü Wenyu (eds.): Siku da cidian 四庫大辭典 (2 vols.). Jilin daxue chubanshe, Changchun 1996, vol. 2, p. 2135a
