= Duke Dao of Qi =

Ruler of the Chinese state of Qi from 488 to 485 BC

Duke Dao of Qi 齊悼公

Duke of Qi
- Reign: 488–485 BC
- Predecessor: Lü Tu
- Successor: Duke Jian
- Died: 485 BC
- Spouse: Ji Ji
- Issue: Duke Jian; Duke Ping
Names
- Ancestral name: Jiāng (姜); Clan name: Lǚ (呂); Given name: Yángshēng (陽生)
Posthumous name
- Duke Dao (悼公)
- House: Jiang
- Dynasty: Jiang Qi
- Father: Duke Jing

Duke Dao of Qi (Chinese: 齊悼公; pinyin: Qí Dào Gōng), personal name Lü Yangsheng, was the 28th ruler of the Jiang Qi state from 488 BC until his death in 485 BC.

== Accession to the throne ==
Prince Yangsheng was a middle son of Duke Jing of Qi. In the summer of 490 BC, the 58th year of Duke Jing's reign, the crown prince of Qi died. Although Duke Jing had at least five other grown sons, he made Prince Tu, his youngest son by his favourite concubine Yu Si, the new crown prince. Because Prince Tu was a young boy and his mother was of a lowly status, Duke Jing ordered the ministers Guo Xia of the Guo clan and Gao Zhang of the Gao clan to support Prince Tu and exile the other princes to the remote city of Lai.

Duke Jing died soon afterward in the autumn of 490 BC. Guo and Gao installed Prince Tu on the throne, and the other princes escaped abroad. Yangsheng fled to the neighbouring State of Lu. However, the next year the Tian and Bao clans led by Tian Qi and Bao Mu staged a coup d'etat and defeated the Gao and Guo clans. Tian Qi brought back Yangsheng from Lu and installed him on the throne, to be known as Duke Dao of Qi. Bao Mu was reluctant to depose Prince Tu but dared not oppose Tian. Duke Dao soon killed Prince Tu, who is posthumously known as An Ruzi. The Tian clan would from then on increasingly dominate the power of Qi, eventually replacing the House of Jiang as monarchs of Qi in 386 BC.

== Battle with Lu ==
When Duke Dao was exiled in the State of Lu, he married Ji Ji (季姬), younger sister of Ji Kangzi (季康子), who was the leader of the Ji clan, one of the three clans that controlled the power of Lu. After Duke Dao returned to Qi and ascended the throne, he sent for his wife in Lu. When Duke Dao was away, however, Ji Ji had an adulterous relationship with her uncle Ji Fanghou (季魴侯). Afraid that Duke Dao might discover his wife's infidelity, Lu refused to send Ji Ji to Qi.

Enraged by Lu's refusal to send his wife, in 487 BC Duke Dao dispatched Bao Mu to invade Lu with the Qi army, taking the cities of Huan (讙) and Chan (闡). Lu was forced to send Ji Ji to Qi, and Qi returned the two cities to Lu. In the same year Duke Dao killed Bao Mu for trying to incite rebellion among the Qi princes.

== Death ==
In 485 BC, the fourth year of Duke Dao's reign, the states of Wu, Lu, Zhu and Tan (郯) invaded Qi. Fuchai, the king of Wu, was the commander of the allied forces as Wu was at the time the most powerful state of China.

By the time the invading forces reached southern Qi, Duke Dao had been killed by a Qi official, probably Tian Heng, who had succeeded his father Tian Qi as leader of the Tian clan. When the obituary reached King Fuchai, he suspended the campaign and for three days cried outside the army camp, according to the etiquette of the time. After the mourning period was over, Fuchai launched a naval attack on Qi, but was defeated and forced to retreat. Duke Dao's son Prince Ren subsequently ascended the throne, to be known as Duke Jian of Qi.

== Family ==
Wives:

- Ji Ji, of the Jisun lineage of the Ji clan of Lu (季姬 姬姓 季孫氏), a daughter of Viscount Huan of Ji (季桓子) and a younger sister of Viscount Kang of Ji (季康子); married in 490 BC

Sons:

- Prince Ren (公子壬; d. 481 BC), ruled as Duke Jian of Qi from 484 to 481 BC
- Prince Ao (公子驁; d. 456 BC), ruled as Duke Ping of Qi from 480 to 456 BC

Duke Dao of Qi House of Jiang Died: 485 BC
Regnal titles
Preceded by An Ruzi	Duke of Qi; 488–485 BC	Succeeded by Duke Jian of Qi
