= Duke Jian =

Duke Jian may refer to:

- Duke Jian of Qi (died 481 BC)
- Duke Jian of Qin (428–400 BC)
