= Wang Qi =

Wang Qi is the name of:

- Wang Qi (athlete), Chinese hammer thrower
- Wang Qi (footballer, born October 1993), Chinese midfielder
- Wang Qi (footballer, born November 1993), Chinese goalkeeper
- Wang Qi (physician) (born 1943), Chinese andrologist
- Wang Qi (scientist), Chinese materials scientist and academician of the Chinese Academy of Engineering
- Wang Qi (gymnast) (born 2010), Chinese gymnast

== See also ==
- Qiwang (disambiguation)
