= Duke Xuan of Qi =

Ruler of State of Qi from 455 to 405 BC

Duke Xuan of Qi 齊宣公

Duke of Qi
- Reign: 455–405 BC
- Predecessor: Duke Ping
- Successor: Duke Kang
- Died: 405 BC
- Issue: Duke Kang
Names
- Ancestral name: Jiāng (姜); Clan name: Lǚ (呂); Given name: Jī (積)
Posthumous name
- Duke Xuan (宣公)
- House: Jiang
- Dynasty: Jiang Qi
- Father: Duke Ping

Duke Xuan of Qi (Chinese: 齊宣公; pinyin: Qí Xuān Gōng), personal name Lü Ji, was the 31st ruler of the Jiang Qi state from 455 BC until his death in 405 BC.

== Reign ==
Duke Xuan succeeded his father, Duke Ping of Qi, who died in 456 BC after 25 years of reign as titular ruler of Qi. Since Tian Heng killed Duke Xuan's uncle Duke Jian in 481 BC, Tian had effectively ruled the State of Qi. Tian Heng died soon after Duke Xuan's accession, and was succeeded by his son Tian Pan as Prime Minister and de facto ruler.

Duke Xuan ruled for 51 years and went through four generations of Tian leaders. After Tian Pan's death, Tian Bai succeeded his father. Qi attacked the State of Jin in 413 BC and the State of Lu the next year. Tian Bai died in 411 BC and his son Tian Daozi became leader of the Tian clan and de facto ruler of Qi. In 408 BC, Qi attacked Lu again, taking the city of Cheng. The following year, Qi invaded the State of Wey and annexed the city of Guanqiu.

== Succession ==
In 405 BC, Duke Xuan died and was succeeded by his son, Duke Kang of Qi, who would become the last ruler of the House of Jiang. In 386 BC Tian He would be formally declared Duke of Qi, ending more than six centuries of rule by the House of Jiang.

== Family ==
Sons:

- Prince Dai (公子貸; d. 379 BC), ruled as Duke Kang of Qi from 404–386 BC

Duke Xuan of Qi House of Jiang Died: 405 BC
Regnal titles
Preceded by Duke Ping of Qi	— TITULAR — Duke of Qi; 455–405 BC; Reason for succession failure: House of Tian in control	Succeeded by Duke Kang of Qi
