= Taigong =

Taigong or Duke Tai may refer to:

- Jiang Ziya (fl. 12th–11th century BC?), also known as Duke Tai of Qi
- Bo Qin (died 998 BC?), also known as Duke Tai of Lu
- Duke Tai of Tian Qi (died 384 BC)
- Liu Taigong (282–197 BC), father of Emperor Gaozu of Han

== See also ==
- King Tai of Zhou
