= Jixia Academy =

Academy in Linzi, Qi, China, in the third century BCE

- Traditional Chinese: 稷下學宮
- Simplified Chinese: 稷下学宫
Transcriptions
Standard Mandarin
- Hanyu Pinyin: Jìxià xuégōng
- Gwoyeu Romatzyh: Jihshiah shyuegong
- Wade–Giles: Chi^{4}-hsia^{4} hsüeh^{2}-kung^{1}
- IPA: [tɕîɕjâ ɕɥěkʊ́ŋ]
Yue: Cantonese
- Yale Romanization: Jīk-haah hohk-gūng
- Jyutping: Zik^{1}-haa^{6} hok^{6}-gung^{1}
Southern Min
- Tâi-lô: Tsik-hā ha̍k-kiong

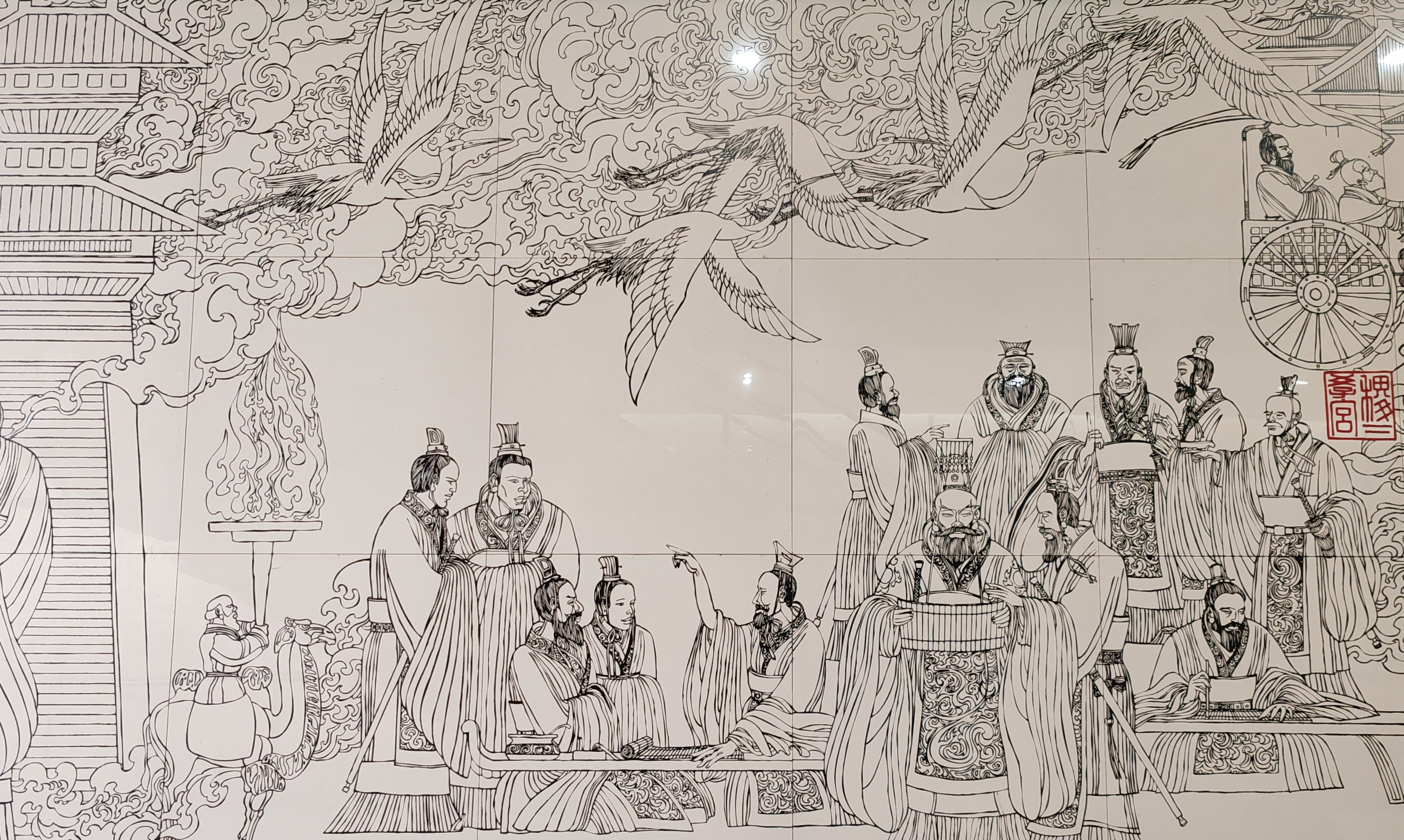
Depiction of Jixia Academy in Zibo Museum

The Jixia Academy, also known as the Academy of the Gate of Chi, was a scholarly academy during the Warring States period. It was located in Linzi, the capital of Qi (present-day Shandong). The academy took its name from its position outside the city's western gate, named for the harvest god Ji or Hou ji.

== Establishment ==
Based on passages in the Records of the Grand Historian, the academy is generally credited to King Xuan and given a foundation date around 318 BC. However, Xu Gan credited the academy to King Xuan's grandfather, Duke Huan of Tian Qi, not to be confused with Duke Huan of Qi. Sima Qian's passages are consistent with King Xuan having restored – rather than established – the institution.

The academy has been characterized as "the first time on record a state began to act as a patron of scholarship out of the apparent conviction that this was a proper function of the state", though some have argued that its Huanglao political theories, and the prestige produced by the project, were undertaken merely to bolster the Tian clan's legitimacy following Duke Tai's overthrow of Qi's previous Jiang dynasty and Duke Huan of Tian Qi execution of his brother, nephew, and mother.

== Importance ==
Scholars – including the most renowned of the era – came from great distances to lodge in the academy: the Taoist philosophers Tian Pia, Shen Dao, Peng Meng, and possibly Zhuangzi; Zou Yan, the founder of the School of Naturalists; Yin Wen, one of the forerunners of the School of Names; the Mohist philosopher Song Xing; and the Confucian philosophers Mencius, Xun Zi, and Chunyu Kun. The famous scenes of the Mencius dealing with King Xuan arose from the philosopher's time at the academy. The Jixia Academy was also the original center of the Huanglao school and was involved with the compilation of the Guanzi essay Neiye "Inward Training" that is the oldest received writing concerning "cultivation of qi" and meditation. Some have argued it was the probable location for the editing and redaction that produced the current Tao Teh Ching.

The academy was popular not only because of the mansions and stipends provided, but because of the honors bestowed by King Xuan: the chief scholar held the rank of "Grand Prefect" and other leaders of the academy were called "Master" (先生, xiānshēng) and honored as if they were high ministers of state (上大夫, shàngdàifū) rather than lowly scholar gentry and they were exempt from corvee. According to the anti-Confucian chapter eleven of Discourses on Salt and Iron (81 BC), "King Xuan of Qi appreciated the scholars and their teachings. Mencius, Chunyu Kun, and others neglected the high offices they were given, preferring to make speeches about affairs of state. There were more than one thousand of these scholars disputing at the Jixia Academy in Qi. You admit that people like Gongsun Hong were everywhere then."

== Legacy ==
The Jixia Academy thrived until the reign of King Min. In 284 BC, it was scattered by Yan's sack of Linzi. However, Sima Qian credited its example with the creation of other academies, particularly those of the Four Lords: Lord Mengchang's within Qi, as well as Lord Pingyuan's in Zhao, Lord Chunshen's in Chu, and Lord Xinling's in Wei. In Qin, the chancellor Lü Buwei supported thousands of scholars between 250 and 238 BC.

== Archaeology ==
In February 2022, archaeologists announced the discovery of the ruins of the academy in Zibo city, Shandong province. The excavation, which had been going for 5 years before the announcement, turned up four rows of building foundations that belonged to the academy complex, along with architectural components that "would glow with colorful lights when the sun shines on them". The site measures about 210 m from east to west at its widest and 190 m long from north to south, shaped roughly like a right-angled trapezoid from above, with a total area of nearly 40,000 square meters.
