= Xunzi (philosopher) =

Chinese Confucian philosopher (c. 310 – after 238 BCE)

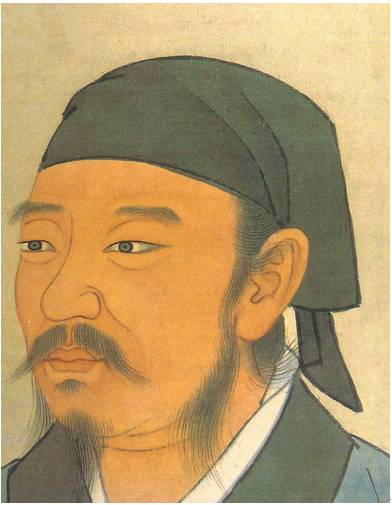
- Imaginary portrait of Xunzi, Qing dynasty (1636–1912), Palace Museum
- Born: c. 310 BCE; Zhao, Zhou dynasty (present-day Shanxi)
- Died: After c. 238 BCE; Chu, Zhou dynasty

Philosophical work
- Era: Hundred Schools of Thought
- Region: Chinese philosophy
- School: Confucianism
- Notable students: Han Fei, Li Si
- Main interests: Ritual (li), human nature, education, music, heaven, Tao, rectification of names

Chinese name
- Chinese: 荀況
- Hanyu Pinyin: Xún Kuàng
Transcriptions
Standard Mandarin
- Hanyu Pinyin: Xún Kuàng
- Wade–Giles: Hsün^{2} K'uang^{4}
- IPA: [ɕy̌n kʰwâŋ]
Yue: Cantonese
- Yale Romanization: Sèuhn Fong
- Jyutping: Seon4 Fong3
- IPA: [sɵn˩ fɔŋ˧]
Southern Min
- Tâi-lô: Sûn Hóng
Middle Chinese
- Middle Chinese: Zwin Xüàng
Old Chinese
- Baxter–Sagart (2014): *s-N-qʷin [m̥]ang-s

Alternative Chinese name
- Traditional Chinese: 荀子
- Simplified Chinese: 荀子
- Hanyu Pinyin: Xúnzǐ
Transcriptions
Standard Mandarin
- Hanyu Pinyin: Xúnzǐ
- Wade–Giles: Hsün^{2} Tzu^{3}

Xunzi (荀子, Xúnzǐ, lit. 'Master Xun'; c. 310 – c. after 238 BCE), born Xun Kuang, was a late Warring States period Confucian Chinese philosopher, often ranked as the third great Confucian philosopher of antiquity after his predecessors Confucius and Mencius. By his time, Confucianism had suffered considerable criticism from Taoist and Mohist thinkers, and Xunzi is traditionally regarded as a synthesizer of these traditions with earlier Confucian thought. The result was a thorough and cohesive revision of Confucianism, which was crucial to the philosophy's ability to flourish in the Han dynasty and throughout the later history of East Asia. His works were compiled in the eponymous Xunzi, and survive in excellent condition. Unlike other ancient compilations, his authorship of these texts is generally secure, though it is likely that Western Han dynasty historian Liu Xiang organized them into their present form centuries after Xunzi's death.

Born in the state of Zhao, Xunzi studied at the prestigious Jixia Academy in Qi, where he learned about every major philosophical tradition of his time. After graduating, Xunzi traveled to Chu where he mastered poetry, returning to the academy as a highly regarded teacher. His students Han Fei and Li Si each had important political and academic careers, though some of their Legalist sentiments were at odds with his philosophy. Other students such as Fuqiu Bo, Zhang Cang and Mao Heng authored important editions and commentaries on the Confucian classics. Later in his life, Xunzi served in the court of Lord Chunshen and died sometime after Lord Chunshen's death. The constant warfare of his time informed his work profoundly, as did his interactions with leaders and witnessing the downfall of various states.

Xunzi's writings respond to dozens of thinkers, often naming and criticizing them directly. His well-known notion that "Human nature is evil" has led many commentators to place him opposite to Mencius, who believed human nature was intrinsically good. Both saw education and ritual as key to self-cultivation, which for Xunzi could circumvent one's naturally foul nature. Xunzi's definition of both concepts was loose, encouraging lifelong education and applied ritual to every aspect of life. Though he still cited the ancient sages, he differed from other Confucian philosophers by his insistence on emulating recent rulers rather than those of long ago. Other important topics include the promotion of music and the careful application of names.

Repeated oversimplifications and misunderstandings on Xunzi's teachings, particularly his view on human nature, led to gradual dismissal and condemnation of his thought from the Tang dynasty onwards. By the rise of Neo-Confucianism in the 10th century, Mencius gradually upended Xunzi, particularly by the choice to include the Mencius in the Four Books. Since the 20th century, a reevaluation of Xunzi's doctrine has taken place in East Asia, leading to recognition of his profound impact and relevance to both his times and present day.

== Sources and context ==
Detailed information concerning Xunzi is largely nonexistent. Yet when compared to the scarcity of knowledge for many other ancient Chinese philosophers, there is meaningful and significant extant information on the life of Xunzi. The sinologist John H. Knoblock asserts that the sources available "permit not only a reconstruction of the outlines of career but also an understanding of his intellectual development". Xunzi's writings have survived in exceptionally good condition, and while they provide biographical details, the authenticity of this information is sometimes questionable. (Note: Goldin 1999, p. xiii notes that the information on Xunzi in his writings may have never been intended as biographical, and rather served as anecdotes for the sake of teaching.) In addition to these, the main source for Xunzi's life is Sima Qian's Shiji (史記; Records of the Grand Historian), which includes a biography of Xunzi (SJ, 74.12–14) and mentions of him in the biographies of both Li Si (SJ, 78.15) and Lord of Chunshen (SJ, 87.1–2, 14). (Note: It is worth noting that historical accuracy in the Shiji is also sometimes questionable, especially on its coverage of philosophers such as Xunzi.) The Western Han dynasty historian Liu Xiang revised and expanded Sima Qian's initial biography for the preface of the first edition of Xunzi's writings. Some minor references to Xunzi also exist in Ying Shao's paraphrase of Liu Xiang's preface, as well as brief mentions in the Han Feizi, Zhan Guo Ce and Yantie Lun. (Note: Scholars such as Wang Zhong and Hu Yuanyi later improved the outline of Xun Quang's life, culminating in a synthesis of information by the Qing dynasty historian Wang Xianqian. The early 20th century saw a new generation of scholars, particularly from the Doubting Antiquity School, improve the information and as recently as the late 20th century scholars from Beijing University have improved these outlines further.)

The Warring States period (c. 475–221 BCE), an era of immense disunity and warfare, had been raging for over a hundred years by the time of Xunzi's birth in the late 4th century BCE. Yet this time also saw considerable innovations in Chinese philosophy, referred to as the Hundred Schools of Thought. The primary schools were Confucianism, Daoism, Legalism, Mohism, the School of Names, and the Yin–Yang School. Xunzi was a philosopher in the tradition of Confucianism, begun by Confucius who lived over two centuries before him.

== Life and career ==
=== Youth and time in Qi (c. 310–284) ===
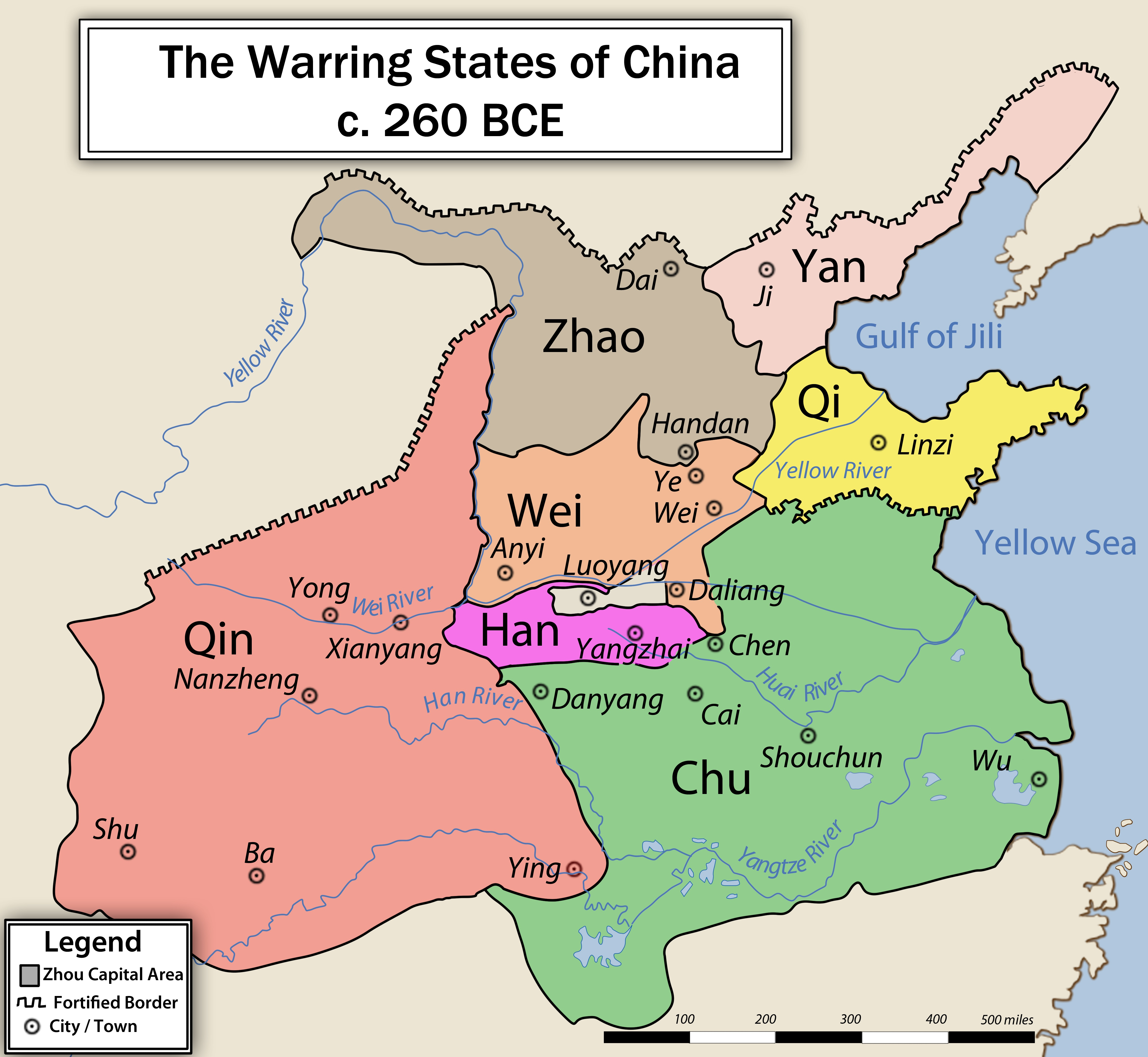
Map of China during the Warring States period, 260 BCE

Xunzi was born as Xun Kuang (荀況), probably around 310 BCE but certainly before 279 BCE. In his time, he was probably known as Xun Qing (荀卿), meaning 'Minister Xun', or 'Chamberlain Xun', after his later position. Some texts give his surname as Sun (孫) instead of Xun, though this may have been to avoid naming taboo during the reign of Emperor Xuan of Han (73–48 BCE), whose given name was Xun. (Note: There remains much uncertainty around the reason for variations on Xunzi's surname. See Knoblock 1988, pp. 233–239 for a detailed overview and other possible explanations.) He is best known by his honorary title Xunzi (荀子) translated to 'Master Xun', with zi being a common epithet for important philosophers. His birthplace was Zhao, a state in the modern-day Shanxi Province of north-central China. It is possible Xunzi was descended from the Xun family, an elite clan that had diminished following the Partition of Jin, though this is only speculation. The Eastern Han dynasty historian Ying Shao records that in his youth Xunzi was a "flowering talent" in matters of scholarship and academics. Essentially nothing else is known of Xunzi's background or upbringing, and thus any attempts to connect his philosophy with either topic are futile.

Sometime between age 13 and 15 (297 and 295 BCE), Xunzi traveled to the north eastern state of Qi. (Note: Unlike the accounts of Sima Qian and Liu Xiang, the record from Ying Shao states that Xunzi was 48 to 50 when he traveled to Qi. Most scholars disregard this account. See Knoblock 1982–1983, pp. 33–34 for further information on this matter) There he attended the Jixia Academy, which was the most important philosophical center in Ancient China, established by King Xuan. At the academy, Xunzi would have learned about all the major philosophical schools of his time, and been in the presence of scholars such as Zou Yan, Tian Pian, and Chunyu Kun. Xunzi would have learned the art of shuo (說), a formal argument of persuasion that philosophical authorities of the time used to advise rulers. After his academy study, Xunzi unsuccessfully attempted to persuade Lord Mengchang against continuing the extreme policies of Qi, though the historicity of this event is not certain. After the exchange, which is later recounted in his writings, Xunzi likely left Qi between 286 and 284 BCE.

=== Stay in Chu and return to Qi (c. 283–265) ===
Xunzi traveled to the southern state of Chu by 283 BCE, where he probably became acquainted with the nascent forms of the fu poetry style, particularly because of the poet's Qu Yuan residency there. Xunzi achieved considerable skill in the art, and his now-lost book of poems was well-regarded for many centuries. Chu was under especially frequent attacks from the Qin state, events which Xunzi would later recount in a conversation with Li Si. The solidity of Chu decreased so rapidly that Xunzi left around 275 BCE, returning to the more stable Qi state. He was warmly welcomed back in Qi, and held in very high-regard as an intellectual. The Shiji records that King Xiang of Qi had Xunzi sacrifice wine three times, a task that was reserved for the most respected scholar available. The eminence at which he was held suggests that Xunzi became the head of the Jixia Academy, but he is known to have taught there regardless. It was at this time that Xunzi composed much of his most important philosophical works, namely the chapters "Of Honor and Disgrace", "Of Kings and the Lords-Protector", "Discourse on Nature", "Discourse on Music", and "Man's Nature is Evil".

In his time, Xunzi was called "the most revered of teachers" (zui wei laoshi; 最爲老師). His most famous pupils were Han Fei and Li Si, each who would have important political and academic careers. Xunzi's association with Li Si, the future Chancellor (or Prime Minister) of the Qin dynasty would later tarnish his reputation. Other students of his included Fuqiu Bo, Zhang Cang and Mao Heng, all of whom authored important editions and commentaries on the Confucian classics. The timeline for his academy teaching is unclear, though he seemed to have considered other posts after being slandered. He left Qi in around 265 BCE, around the time when King Jian succeeded Xiang.

=== Travels and later career (c. 265 – after 238) ===
Xunzi notes that despite Qin's achievements, it is "filled with trepidation. Despite its complete and simultaneous possession of all these numerous attributes, if one weights Qin by the standard of the solid achievements of True Kingship, then the vast degree to which it fails to reach the ideal is manifest. Why is that? It is that it is dangerously lacking in Ru [Confucian] scholars"

— Xunzi, chp. 16: "On Strengthening the State", 16.6

Xunzi's writings suggest that after leaving Qi he visited Qin, possibly from 265 BCE to 260 BCE. He aimed to convert the state's leaders to follow his philosophy of leadership, a task which proved difficult because of the strong hold that Shang Yang's Legalist sentiments had there. In a conversation with the Qin official Fan Sui, Xunzi praised much of the state's achievements, officials and governmental organizations. Still, Xunzi found issues with the state, primarily its lack of Confucian scholars and the fear it inspires, which Xunzi claimed would result in the surrounding states uniting up against. Xunzi then met with King Zhaoxiang, arguing that Qin's lack of Confucian scholars and educational encouragement would be detrimental to the state's future. The king was unconvinced by Xunzi's persuasion, and did not offer him a post in his court.

In around 260 BCE, Xunzi returned to his native Zhao, where he debated military affairs with Lord Linwu (臨武君) in the court of King Xiaocheng of Zhao. He remained in Zhao until c. 255 BCE.

In 240 BCE Lord Chunshen, the prime minister of Chu, invited him to take a position as Magistrate of Lanling (蘭陵令), which he initially refused and then accepted. However, Lord Chunshen was assassinated In 238 BCE by a court rival and Xunzi subsequently lost his position. He retired, remained in Lanling, a region in what is today's southern Shandong province, for the rest of his life and was buried there. The year of his death is unknown, though if he lived to see the ministership of his student Li Si, as recounted, he would have lived into his nineties, dying shortly after 219 BCE.

== Philosophy ==
=== Human nature – xing ===
The best known and most cited section of the Xunzi is chapter 23, "Human Nature (xing 性) is Evil". While technically accurate as a translation, Xunzi considers human nature "detestable", or "ugly" rather than "irretrievably evil", and is often translated as "bad". Michael Nylan aptly translates "evil" as "odious"; Kurtis Hagen in such terms as: “problematic,” “uncontrolled,” “confused,” “coarse” or “crude.”

Positioned as a closing argument, the climactic chapter forcefully and rigorously argues that human nature is bad or "evil", and that Mencius' view of human nature as good is wrong. Xunzi argues that because people are born with a love of profit, violence and robbery will arise. But Xunzi also considered people "utterly improvable".

Before people can become "correct" and "orderly", they must wait to be transformed by a teacher who will "hone" them (like a craftsman), so that they may obtain ritual and righteousness. This will result in deference and courtesy, bringing about the restoration of government.

Human nature (性; xìng) was a topic which Confucius commented on somewhat ambiguously, leaving much room for later philosophers to expand upon. Xunzi only appears familiar with Shang Yang as a renowned military leader who strengthened Qin, but can be compared with him. While Shang Yang believed that people were selfish, Xunzi believed that humanity's inborn tendencies were evil (惡; è) and that ethical norms had been invented to rectify people.

Xunzi's variety of Confucianism therefore has a more pessimistic flavor than the optimistic Confucianism of Mencius, who tended to view humans as innately good. Like most Confucians, however, he believed that people could be refined through education and ritual.

Now, since human nature is evil, it must await the instructions of a teacher and the model before it can be put aright, and it must obtain ritual principles and a sense of moral right before it can become orderly.

— Xunzi, chapter 23b: "Human Nature is Evil"

Both Mencius and Xunzi believed in human nature and both believed that it was possible to become better, but some people refused to do so. Mencius saw Xing as an ideal state, while Xunzi saw it as a starting state.

Though Mencius had already died when the book was written, the chapter is written like a conversation between the two philosophers. Xunzi’s approach to moral self-cultivation was more complex than Mencius’s: since he saw human nature as inherently detestable, it could not be overcome, only transformed. Some people thought Xunzi's ideas were strange, but new discoveries suggest that it might have actually been Mencius who had unusual ideas about human nature. Xunzi also thought that people could improve themselves by learning good habits and manners, which he called "artifice." (偽) He believed that people needed to transform their nature to become good. This could be done by learning from a teacher and following rituals and morals.

Xunzi only stated that the "heart" can observe reason, that is, it can distinguish between right and wrong, good and evil, but it is not the source of value. According to Xunzi's theory of evil human nature, morality will ultimately become a tool of external value used to maintain social stability and appeal to authoritarianism. Mencius' theory of good human nature, on the other hand, states that humans are inherently good and we have an internal value foundation (the Four Beginnings).

Xunzi contended that the quiescent heart allows thought to extend over unbounded distance. The usage of a "thousand miles" (thousand li) conveying a long distance in Chinese idiomatic expressions can be traced to Xunzi's usage.

=== Music – yue ===
Music is discussed throughout the Xunzi, particularly in chapter 20, the "Discourse on Music" (Yuelun; 樂論). Much of the Xunzi's sentiments on music are directed towards Mozi, who largely disparaged music. Mozi held that music provides no basic needs and is a waste of resources and money. Xunzi presents a comprehensive argument in opposition, stating that certain music provides joy, which is indeed essential to human wellbeing. Music and joy are respectively translated as yue and le, and their connection in Xunzi's time may explain why both words share the same Chinese character: 樂. Xunzi also points out the use of music for social harmony:

故樂在宗廟之中，君臣上下同聽之，則莫不和敬；閨門之內，父子兄弟同聽之，則莫不和親；鄉里族長之中，長少同聽之，則莫不和順。
Hence, when music is performed within the ancestral temple, lord and subject, high and low, listen to the music together and are united in feelings of reverence. When music is played in the private quarters of the home, father and son, elder and younger brother, listen to it together and are united in feelings of close kinship. When it is played in village meetings or clan halls, old and young listen to the music together and are joined in obedience.

— Xunzi, chapter 20: "Discourse on Music"

Many commentators have noted the similarities between the reasons for Xunzi's promotion of music and those of ancient Greek philosophers.

=== Gentleman – junzi ===
Ultimately, he refused to admit theories of state and administration apart from ritual and self-cultivation, arguing for the gentleman, rather than the measurements promoted by the Legalists, as the wellspring of objective criterion. His ideal gentleman (junzi) king and government, aided by a class of learned Confucian scholars, are similar to that of Mencius, but without the tolerance of feudalism since he rejected hereditary titles and believed that an individual's status in the social hierarchy should be determined only by their own merit.

== Modern editions ==
- Xunzi (Xun Kuang) (1927). The Works of Hsüntze. Translated by Dubs, Homer. London: Arthur Probsthain. Reprinted (1966), Taipei: Chengwen.
- —— (1963). Hsün Tzu: Basic Writings. Translated by Watson, Burton. New York: Columbia University Press. ISBN 978-0-231-12965-7. OCLC 50803310.
- —— (1988–1994). Xunzi: A Translation and Study of the Complete Works. Translated by Knoblock, John. Stanford: Stanford University Press.
  - —— (1988). Xunzi: A Translation and Study of the Complete Works. Vol. I: Books 1–6. Translated by Knoblock, John. Stanford: Stanford University Press.
  - —— (1990). Xunzi: A Translation and Study of the Complete Works. Vol. II: Books 7–16. Translated by Knoblock, John. Stanford: Stanford University Press.
  - —— (1994). Xunzi: A Translation and Study of the Complete Works. Vol. III: Books 17–32. Translated by Knoblock, John. Stanford: Stanford University Press.
- —— (2014). Xunzi: The Complete Text. Translated by Hutton, Eric. Princeton: Princeton University Press. doi:10.2307/j.ctt6wq19b. S2CID 246223800.
- —— (2023). Good Beyond Evil: Xunzi on Human Nature. Translated by Hu, Mingyuan. London and Paris: Hermits United. ISBN 978-1-7391156-2-3.
