= Xiang of Qi =

Xiang of Qi may refer to:

- Duke Xiang of Qi (died 686 BC)
- King Xiang of Qi (died 265 BC)
