= King Min of Qi =

King Min of Qi 齊湣王
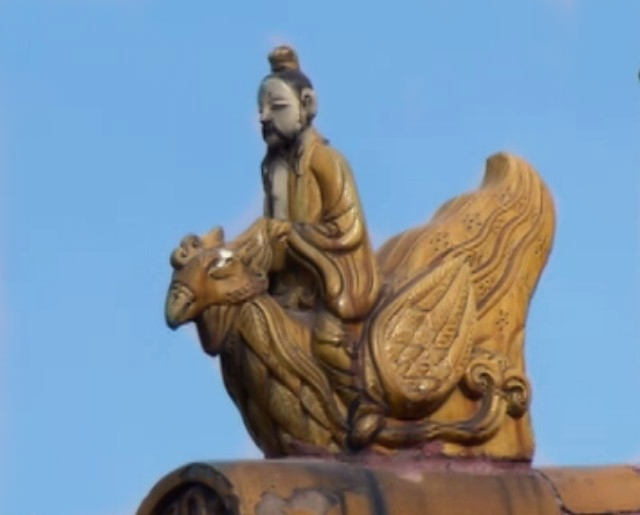

King of Qi
- Reign: 300–284 BC
- Predecessor: King Xuan
- Successor: King Xiang
- Born: c. 323 BC
- Died: 284 BC
- Spouse: Su Liu Nü (宿瘤女); Queen Dowager Min
- Issue: King Xiang; Tian Guan (田關)
Names
- Ancestral name: Guī (媯); Clan name: Tián (田); Given name: Dì (地) or Suì (遂)
Posthumous name
- King Min (湣王 or 閔王)
- House: Gui
- Dynasty: Tian Qi
- Father: King Xuan

King Min of Qi (Chinese: 齊湣王; pinyin: Qí Mǐn Wáng), personal name Tian Di (Chinese: 田地), was the sixth monarch of the Tian Qi state. During his reign, the troops of Yan, Qin, Zhao, Han, Wei, and Chu launched the Battle of Jixi (濟西之戰) against Qi, resulting in Qi's defeat.

== Life ==
Later historians generally portray King Min in a negative light. In their translation of The Annals of Lü Buwei, translators John Knoblock and Jeffrey Riegel summarize Lü Buwei's view as follows:

Famous for his paranoia and megalomania, the king was the archetype of the unworthy and unaware ruler.

The philosopher Xunzi wrote of King Min:

The king of Qi perished and his state was destroyed, punished by all under Heaven. When later generations speak of bad men, they are sure to mention him.

Qi was one of the most powerful states in China at his accession, if not the most powerful. In 288 BC, King Min took the title of Di of the East (東帝) while his ally King Zhaoxiang of Qin named himself Di of the West (西帝) (Note: Di was originally the name of the high god of the Shang Dynasty. It also (or later) had a weaker sense of sacred or divine; the same character was used to mean "Emperor" in later times.), but so many people objected that both kings were forced to return to the title of "king" (wáng 王) and there was no Di in China until Qin Shi Huang unified China in 221 BC and gave himself the title of Huangdi, which is translated as "Emperor" in English.

King Min, like his predecessors, supported scholars in the Jixia Academy and invited prominent visitors to talk with him, such as the Huang-Lao Daoist Yin Wen. Su Qin was one of his advisors; Lord Mengchang was for a while his chancellor. But "all of King Min's assessments were like this [i.e. foolish], which is why his state was destroyed and his person placed in harm's way." King Min had his critics executed, sometimes in cruel ways such as being boiled alive or cut in two at the waist; he gradually alienated the commoners, his own royal clan, and the great ministers. In one story, his physician Wen Zhi (文摯) from the state of Song deliberately made the king angry as the only way to treat his illness; the king boiled Wen Zhi alive.

The Biographies of Exemplary Women, compiled about 18 BC by the scholar Liu Xiang, includes in its "Accomplished Speakers" section a story about the virtuous wife of King Min, "The Lump-necked Woman of Qi." She was a mulberry-picker who lived east of the Qi capital. One day when King Min came by, everyone stopped working to look at him except this woman. He sent for her and asked why. She said she was obeying her parents, who had told her to pick mulberries (for feeding to silkworms), not stare at the king. The king was interested and wanted to take her back to the palace. But she said she wanted to be treated like "a pure maiden," with a marriage-broker visiting her parents. The king therefore sent a messenger to arrange a betrothal. "Her parents were very surprised and wanted to bathe and dress her. The woman said, 'When I saw the king, this is how I looked,'" and refused to change. At court, all the ladies laughed at her, but she pointed out that the famous kings of old were frugal and modest and therefore successful. "After this, the ladies were all very ashamed. King Min was greatly moved and made the lump-necked woman his queen." He cut down on expenses and became less lavish. "In several months, the transformation spread to neighboring states, and all of the feudal lords came to Qi's court. [King Min] then invaded the three Jin [kingdoms], struck terror in Qin and Chu, and set himself up with the title 'emperor.' That King Min was able to accomplish all of this was due to the efforts of the lump-necked woman." The book goes on to say that after she died, King Min and his kingdom were vanquished.

In 286 BC, King Min attacked and destroyed Song. King Min attacked Chu and defeated its army. But his own army became exhausted, and Qi was promptly attacked in its turn and lost all the territory it had gained. "All blamed the king, saying, 'Who made this plan?' The king said, 'Tian Wen [Lord Mengchang] made it!' and the great ministers thereupon... drove Tian Wen from the state."

At the end of his reign, after King Min had angered even his own generals who were defending Qi, his capital city of Linzi was invaded and sacked in 284 BC by General Yue Yi of Yan, partly at the instigation of King Min's advisor Su Qin. "The army of Yan entered the capital...fighting with each other over the great quantity of bronze stored in the treasury." The king fled to Ju, which along with Jimo was one of the only two Qi cities that remained unoccupied. All but two cities of Qi were conquered. Even after his defeat, King Min never blamed himself; he agreed with an obsequious advisor who said, "Your majesty had the title of Sovereign of the East and in fact controlled the world. You left your state to live in Wey with a manner that expressed complete satisfaction." But the king was then captured, and his former minister, Nao Chi (淖齒), of Chu, confronted the king: " 'For hundreds of miles about your districts... garments have been wet with blood.... Did the king know this?' 'I did not.'... 'Can such a person remain unpunished?' cried Nao Chi and executed King Min in the drum-square at Ju." Another account says Nao Chi "bound King Min by his joints and suspended him from a beam in the ancestral temple. There the king hung all night and died the next day." He is often cited in literature as a warning example of a ruler who would not listen to good advisors but believed bad ones. "This is the reason Qi was defeated on the banks of the Ji River and the country of Qi became a wasteland....King Min died as a result of his arrogance over the greatness of Qi."

Nao Chi was killed by one of King Min's followers, Wangsun Jia, who, with Tian Dan, then reconquered the seventy cities of Qi. They found Tian Fazhang (田法章), King Min's son who had "cast off his robes of royalty and fled to the house of the king's astrologer where he worked as a gardener", and set him on the throne (King Xiang of Qi). Qi never completely regained its power. However, it survived as a kingdom and was the last independent state to succumb to the unification of China proper under Qin Shi Huang in 221 BC.

== Family ==
Queens:

- Su Liu Nü of Qi (宿瘤女)
- Queen Dowager Min (湣太后), the mother of Crown Prince Fazhang

Sons:

- Crown Prince Fazhang (太子法章; d. 265 BC), ruled as King Xiang of Qi from 283 to 265 BC
- Prince Guan (公子關), the progenitor of the Hu (胡) lineage

== Footnotes ==
King Min of Qi House of Tian Born: c. 323 BC Died: 284 BC
Regnal titles
Preceded by King Xuan of Qi	King of Qi; 300–284 BC	Succeeded by King Xiang of Qi
