= Queen Jun =

Queen consort of King Xiang of Qi

Queen Jun (Chinese: 君王后; died 3rd century BC) was the queen consort of King Xiang of Qi.

She was the daughter of an astrologer. She was known for her great influence over the affairs of state.
