= Xunzi (book) =

Chinese Confucian philosophical writings

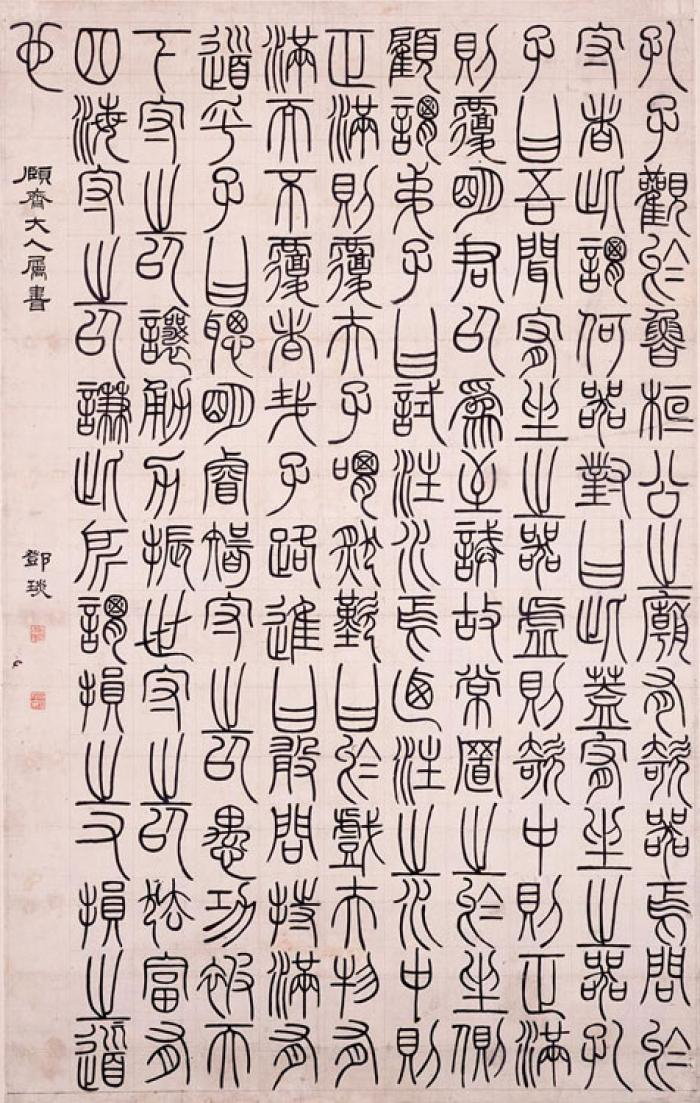
- Text from the Xunzi in seal script
- Author: Xun Kuang (trad.)
- Original title: 荀子
- Language: Classical Chinese
- Genre: Philosophy
- Publication date: c. 3rd century BC
- Publication place: China

Xunzi
- Chinese: 荀子
- Literal meaning: "[The Writings of] Master Xun"
Transcriptions
Standard Mandarin
- Hanyu Pinyin: Xúnzǐ
- Gwoyeu Romatzyh: Shyuntzyy
- Wade–Giles: Hsün^{2}-tzŭ^{3}
- IPA: [ɕy̌n.tsɨ̀]
Wu
- Romanization: Sin-tzy
Yue: Cantonese
- Yale Romanization: Sèuhn-jí
- Jyutping: Seon^{4}-zi^{2}
- IPA: [sɵn˩.tsi˧˥]
Southern Min
- Tâi-lô: Sûn-tzú
Middle Chinese
- Middle Chinese: /siuɪn t͡sɨX/
Old Chinese
- Baxter–Sagart (2014): *s-N-qʷin tsəʔ
- Zhengzhang: /*sqʰʷin ʔslɯʔ/

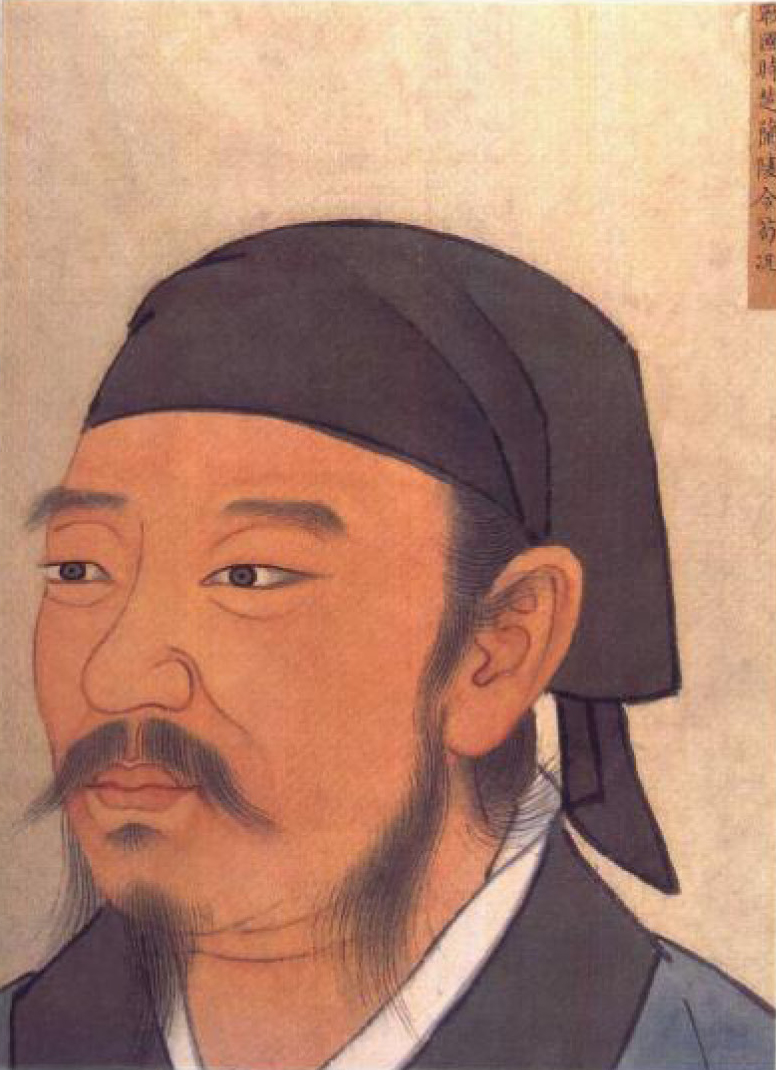
Xun Kuang

The Xunzi (Chinese: 荀子; pinyin: Xúnzi) is an ancient Chinese collection of philosophical writings attributed to (Master (zi)) Xun Kuang, a 3rd-century BC philosopher usually associated with the Confucian tradition. The Xunzi emphasizes education and propriety, and asserts that "human nature is detestable". The text is an important source of early theories of ritual, cosmology, and governance. The ideas within the Xunzi are thought to have exerted a strong influence on Legalist thinkers, such as Han Fei, and laid the groundwork for much of Han dynasty political ideology. The text criticizes a wide range of other prominent early Chinese thinkers, including Laozi, Zhuangzi, Mozi, and Mencius.

Some Xunzi chapters are especially significant. The "Discussion of Heaven (天論 Tiān lùn)" rejects the notion that heaven has a moral will. Instead, Xunzi asserts that heaven operates according to constant principles; thus people should focus on the human, social realm rather than attempting to ascertain the inner-workings of heaven. The "Discussion of Ritual Propriety (禮; lĭ)" chapter gives rules of individual and social decorum. "Dispelling Obsessions" teaches that in focusing on only one aspect of a situation, one often loses sight of the larger purpose. "Proper Use of Terms" (正名; zhēngmíng): A name becomes proper for a situation through conventional usage, but once this is fixed it is improper to deviate from this norm. "Human Dispositions are Detestable" (性惡; xìng è) rejects Mencius's claim that people have a natural inclination toward goodness. Confucius, who simply said that people are similar by nature, was not clear on the matter. Xunzi holds that man is naturally inclined towards selfishness, and that if this inclination is not curbed, human societies devolve into chaos. He argues that people become good only through conscious efforts and social constructs, emphasizing the difference between natural endowment and cultivated potential.

In the first century AD, Liu Xiang redacted Xunzi's extant oeuvre from hundreds of loose fascicles into 32 bundles of bamboo strips. The first commentary on the Xunzi does not appear until 818 AD, when an official named Yang Liang claimed to have corrected errors in the existing bamboo strips and transcribed them on scrolls of silk. Yang's commentary still appears in some modern editions of the text. The text has been continuously in print since the invention of the printing press in the 11th century AD.

== Chapters ==
List of chapters in the Xunzi
No.	Title	
No.	English	Chinese
1	Exhortation to Learning	勸學
2	Cultivating Oneself	修身
3	Nothing Improper	不苟
4	On Honor and Disgrace	榮辱
5	Against Physiognomy	非相
6	Against the Twelve Masters	非十二子
7	On Confucius	仲尼
8	On Achievements of the Ru	儒效
9	The Rule of a True King	王制
10	Enriching the State	富國
11	The True King and the Hegemon	王霸
12	The Way to Be a Lord	君道
13	The Way to Be a Minister	臣道
14	On Attracting Men of Worth	致士
15	A Debate on Military Affairs	議兵
16	The Strong State	強國
17	Discourse on Heaven	天論
18	Correct Judgments	正論
19	Discourse on Ritual	禮論
20	Discourse on Music	樂論
21	Undoing Fixation	解蔽
22	Correct Naming	正名
23	Human Nature Is Bad	性惡
24	The Gentleman	君子
25	Working Songs	成相
26	Fu	賦
27	The Grand Digest	大略
28	The Right-Hand Vessel	宥坐
29	The Way to Be a Son	子道
30	The Proper Model and Proper Conduct	法行
31	Duke Ai	哀公
32	Yao Asked	堯問

The essays in the Xunzi are not arranged in chronological order.

=== "Discourse on Music" ===
Mozi, another philosopher of the Warring States era (pre-unification of China), discouraged the use of music and other forms of culture as being wasteful of resources needed to keep the state healthy and prosperous. Xunzi's chapter on music questions this stance, specifically naming Mozi. Why, poses Xunzi, should music be renounced if created by the sage kings to create order in expression, or if it brings people into unity and harmony and soldiers into order (for example, via war dances)? Or what if it has the ability to reform people? Following a line of Confucian thought, Xunzi argues that music, as defined and ordered by the ancient sage kings, acts like ritual in that it moderates and restrains the person listening and the person performing. It also positively inspires people and is thus an effective means of governing. However, and again agreeing with Confucius, Xunzi does admit that there are types of music which can lead one into licentious behavior, but states that the gentleman knows to be wary of his environment and the sounds he hears.

Music embodies an unchanging harmony, while rites represent unalterable reason. Music unites that which is the same; rites distinguish that which is different; and through the combination of rites and music the human heart is governed... Because he criticized music, one would expect Mozi to have met with some punishment. And yet in his lifetime the enlightened kings had all died and there was no one to correct his errors, so that stupid men continue to study his doctrines and bring jeopardy to themselves.

=== "Undoing Fixation" ===
Xunzi's chapter on dispelling obsession can be understood via the use of an ode he uses from the Book of Odes:

I pluck and pluck the burr-weed But it does not fill my slanting basket. I sigh for my loved one; I would be in the ranks of Zhou.

Because the mind of the plucker in this ode is divided between her task at hand and the love she has for a man in the ranks of Zhou, she cannot complete the simple task of filling her basket. Xunzi warns against falling into obsession in this chapter. When one is subject to obsession, it means that one is focusing so intently on a certain thing (Xunzi claims that Mozi focused too much on utility, while Zhuangzi focused too heavily on Nature, for example) that one's mind will not be able to absorb any new information outside of the realm of one's obsession. One's true mind is thus divided in the sense of there being a wall too tall to see over in one's head separating the obsession from everything else. Obsession, as argued by Xunzi, is so strong that the ineptitude it causes can lead to one's death without one even knowing it. Examples of people who fell into such obsessions include rulers who neglected their duties at the hands of an obsession (for a particular concubine, for example) and thus fell into discord with their people, and usurpers of the throne who also met their end because of their obsession with gaining power.

Alternately, a sage uses the Way (道; Dào) to refrain from obsession and to keep his mind open. In order to accept the Way, one must first understand it, then approve it, then abide by it. The Way is the path away from obsession because of the nature of its interaction with the mind, which is empty, unified and still, according to Xunzi, when it is in accord with the Way. When it happens that one's mind is empty, one is able to possess much intellect without said intellect interfering with the process of absorbing new information. When it happens that one's mind is unified, one understands differences and the variety of information, but does not allow "one fact to impinge upon that of another." When it happens that one's mind is still, although one may daydream and imagine and have a mind constantly in motion, one does not allow these mental meanderings to distort perceptions. Xunzi is referring to peace of mind rather than an attempt to unlearn what one has learned, as Laozi does, when he refers to the mind as being empty, unified and still. When one accords with the Way one is able to treat the world holistically, while outside of the Way one can only see the world as a collection of unrelated units. With this achieved, learning can be done, and should be done to the point of sufficiency (having the understanding of a sage or king, the former having control over morality and the latter having control over society).

For Xunzi, the mind is the ruler of the body, the emptying of which leads one closer to the Way. His argument is similar to that of Zhuangzi, who says that the emptying of the mind will lead one to be actively spontaneous and in harmony with the way. However, as noted below in the "Human Nature Is Bad" section, Xunzi argues for the use of ancient rites and regulations to hone the self, while Zhuangzi believes that simply emptying the mind, without absorbing such information regarding ritual and regulation, and thus falling into a state of wu-wei ("non-action" or "effortless action") is sufficient to walking the path of the Way.

=== "Correct Naming" ===
Employing a technique used by philosophers before him, such as Mozi and Confucius, Xunzi argues for the rectification of names. There are several reasons why Xunzi considered the correct and consistent naming of things was important: so a ruler could adequately command his people in accordance with the Way, without being misunderstood. If misunderstandings were too easily made, then the Way would not effectively be put into action. This appears to be Xunzi's most important reason: "When the ruler's accomplishments are long lasting and his undertakings are brought to completion, this is the height of a good government. All of this is the result of being careful to see that men stick to the names which have been agreed upon." Also, without universally accepted definitions, right and wrong would become blurred (being specific about what constitutes "right" and "wrong" causes morality to be more objective).

To "[distinguish] between things that are the same and those that are different' one must use their senses to understand a thing (via sight, sound, smell, taste, touch) and then compare it to understandings of other things. From these observations, names can be given based on the sameness or difference between things. Individual things will have their own names in this construct as will groups of things (those are musical instruments). The naming of things can become either more or less precise from this point Xunzi also speaks of "things which share the same form but occupy different places and things which have different forms but occupy the same place." The former, such as two flutes, should be distinguished as two separate flutes, although they are of the same form, because they occupy different spaces. However, as one flute is used and becomes damaged or broken over time, it appears to change into something else. But even though it seems to become something different, it is still the same flute and should be regarded as such.

This attention to detail perhaps sounds satirical, but has practical use. Xunzi elaborates on exactly what the name "sage" means, what sort of person it can apply to. Ideally, if all people are able to accurately employ the word "sage" finding a proper teacher (the importance of this is described in the section below), for example, would be easier. Likewise, the idea of being concise and accurate in speaking is made to be a characteristic of the sage and thus antithetical to the sloppy speaking of a fool, who is incapable of learning without the understanding of names.

Xunzi also uses the rectification of names to refute previous philosophers such as the writers of the Daodejing or Laozi (the alleged author of the Daodejing). In this chapter, although without obvious reference to any particular person or school of thought, calls into question the word "desire." In the Daodejing, Laozi argues for the renunciation of desires on the basis that they only lead to excessive and selfish races toward satiety. Xunzi, however, argues that "those who maintain that desires must be gotten rid of before there can be orderly government fail to consider whether desires can be guided..." Here Xunzi asserts that if someone truly understood desires, they would not make such a contradictory statement (desires, in Xunzi's mind, cannot be guided). Xunzi focuses on the mind's ability to reform actions: if one's mind is trained, although there are many desires they will not be acted upon. Conversely, if the mind is untrained, although there are few desires they will be acted upon. In this way, Xunzi uses classification and understanding to assert his point: it is the mind which has control over desires, desires cannot simply be forgotten because they are part of human nature and are from Heaven, as he continues to explain. Also, if a man is truly in accordance with the Way, he will not allow mere desires to change his course of direction.

The rectification of names is an important one considering the course of Chinese philosophy in this era. Philosophers such as Confucius and Laozi, for example, used similar words and ideas (Dao, wu-wei [effortless action], sage) to mean slightly different meanings. One of the aims of name rectification was to create a consistent language that would allow each word to have a consistent and universal meaning, so to avoid the confusion of multiple Ways, etc.

=== "Human Nature is Bad" ===
Xunzi believed that all people are born with natural tendencies toward "waywardness": that is, a taste for profit and beauty and a susceptibility to jealousy and hate, all of which, if indulged in, would lead to disorder and criminality. In order to attain a oneness with the Way, a dedication to morality, Xunzi argued for the guidance of a proper teacher: only this would allow one to become morally upright. A proper teacher would have been trained in the teachings of the ancient sage kings who saw that human nature was inherently immoral and thus wrong. From this realization, the sage kings developed rituals and regulations to shape people into accordance with the Way. Thus the process of following the teachings of the sage kings (and a teacher who can teach them) equates a renunciation of one's evil nature and a commitment to conscious activity (conscious activity because one must deliberately and willingly change their actions in order to overstep their evils which would otherwise occur naturally, without conscious thought).

Xunzi departs from the arguments of previous Confucians here: Confucius claimed that some people (but not all, and not even Confucius himself) were born with the ability to love learning and act in accordance with the Way. Mencius believed that all people were inherently good and that it was negative environmental influences which caused immorality in people. But Xunzi picks apart Mencius's argument in his writing. Mencius, whom Xunzi refers to by name, does not distinguish between nature and conscious practice. The former is inherent, as sight is to the eye or hearing is to the ear: one cannot be taught to see. However conscious thought is something which must be taught and learned:

Now it is the nature of man that when he is hungry he will desire satisfaction, when he is cold he will desire warmth, and when he is weary he will desire rest. This is his emotional nature. And yet a man, although he is hungry, will not dare to be the first to eat if he is in the presence of his elders, because he knows that he should yield to them, and although he is weary, he will not dare to demand rest because he knows that he should relieve others of the burden of labor. For a son to yield to his father or a younger brother to relieve his elder brother – acts such as these are all contrary to man's nature and run counter to his proper forms enjoined by ritual principles.

However, the gap in Xunzi's argument is as follows: if human nature is naturally evil, how did the sage kings come to invent the idea of goodness and morality? Xunzi recognizes the apparent flaw and argues that, just as a potter consciously creates a pot (an object and action not part of his own nature), so does a sage consciously create the rituals and regulations to be followed if morality is the goal. These creations are not part of one's nature, but rather stem from a departure from nature. Xunzi states that "every man who desires to do good does so precisely because his nature is evil... Whatever a man lacks in himself he will seek outside" as the sage kings did when they consulted their personal experiments and ideas to create a means toward morality. According to Xunzi, if people were naturally good, then leaving peoples and governments without laws and restrictions would cause no harm or disorder. Xunzi does not believe this state of affairs to be possible.

Xunzi believed that all people are born with the capacity to become good. For example, great kings like Yao and Shun were born no different from thieves like Robber Zhi or the tyrant Jie: that is, all four possessed the same nature at birth.

The man in the street can become a Yu. What does this mean? What made the sage emperor Yu a Yu, I would reply, was the fact that he practiced benevolence and righteousness and abided by the proper rules and standards. If this is so, then benevolence, righteousness, and proper standards must be based upon principles which can be known and practiced. Any man in the street [can become a Yu].

Xunzi argues that if one associates with gentlemen, one will become a gentleman; if one associates with the immoral, one will become immoral (a similar sentiment can be found in the Analects of Confucius). Xunzi ends the chapter with, "'If you do not know a man, look at his friends; if you do not know a ruler, look at his attendants.' Environment is the important thing! Environment is the important thing!" This attitude toward nurture over nature may appear similar to that of Mencius, but the stances of the two in this case should not be confused: while Mencius argues that people are born good but need a positive environment in order to fully prosper with the Way, Xunzi argues that it is only the environment which can save a person from immorality.

== Translations ==
- Dubs, Homer H., ed. (1927). The Works of Hsüntze. London: Arthur Probsthain. Reprinted (1966), Taipei: Chengwen.
- Koster, Hermann, ed. (1967). Hsün-tzu ins Deutsche Übertragen [Xunzi, Converted into German] (in German). Kaldenkirchen: Steyler Verlag.
- Knoblock, John, trans. (1988–1994). Xunzi: A Translation and Study of the Complete Works, 3 vols. Stanford: Stanford University Press.
- Knoblock, John (English); Zhang, Jue, trans. 张觉 (Mandarin) (1999). Xunzi, English and Chinese. Changsha: Hunan renmin chubanshe.
- Watson, Burton, ed. (2003) [1963]. Xunzi: Basic Writings. New York: Columbia University Press. ISBN 978-0-231-12965-7.
- Hutton, Eric, trans. (2014). Xunzi: The Complete Text. Princeton: Princeton University Press.
