= Duke Ping of Qi =

Ruler of the Chinese state of Qi from 480 to 456 BC

Duke Ping of Qi 齊平公

Duke of Qi
- Reign: 480–456 BC
- Predecessor: Duke Jian
- Successor: Duke Xuan
- Died: 456 BC
- Issue: Duke Xuan
Names
- Ancestral name: Jiāng (姜); Clan name: Lǚ (呂); Given name: Ào (驁)
Posthumous name
- Duke Ping (平公)
- House: Jiang
- Dynasty: Jiang Qi
- Father: Duke Dao

Duke Ping of Qi (Chinese: 齊平公; pinyin: Qí Píng Gōng), personal name Lü Ao, was the 30th ruler of the Jiang Qi state from 480 BC until his death in 456 BC.

== Reign ==
Duke Ping was a younger son of Duke Dao of Qi, who was killed in 485 BC after four years of reign, probably by Tian Heng, leader of the powerful Tian clan. Subsequently Duke Ping's older brother Duke Jian ascended the throne. In 481 BC, Tian Heng staged a preemptive coup d'etat and killed Duke Jian and his prime minister Kan Zhi, who had been plotting to attack and expel the Tian clan.

Tian Heng became the de facto ruler of Qi, but he installed Duke Ping on the throne as the figurehead ruler. Duke Ping ruled for 25 years and died in 456 BC. He was succeeded by his son Duke Xuan of Qi.

== Family ==
Sons:

- Prince Ji (公子積; d. 405 BC), ruled as Duke Xuan of Qi from 455–405 BC

Duke Ping of Qi House of Jiang Died: 456 BC
Regnal titles
Preceded by Duke Jian of Qi	— TITULAR — Duke of Qi; 480–456 BC; Reason for succession failure: House of Tian in control	Succeeded by Duke Xuan of Qi
