= Qiwang =

Qiwang may refer to:

- Qiwang (Go), a Chinese Go competition from 1989 to 2001
- South-West Qiwang, a Go competition in China
- Weifu Fangkai Cup, or Qiwang,, a Go competition in China
- The Chess Master(pinyin: Qíwáng), a 1984 Chinese novel by Ah Cheng
  - Chess King (film), a 1988 Chinese film based on Ah Cheng's novel
- Qi Wang (psychologist), American psychologist and academic

== See also ==
- Prince of Qi (disambiguation)
- Wang Qi (disambiguation)
