= Baimei Shen =

Chinese deity

Baimei Shen (Chinese: 白眉神; lit. 'White-eyebrowed God') is a Chinese god for prostitution and brothels. On her first assignment with a client, a prostitute was supposed to make a sacrifice to him. According to a later tradition, the client was expected to do the same when he first visited a brothel.

== Appearance ==
Baimei Shen has many resemblances with Guan Yu, the god of war, except for his white eyebrows and red eyes. He is mounted on a horse and carries a sword.

== Legends ==
Baimei Shen is often identified with Dao Zhi 盜跖 (Robber Zhi), a slave rebel leader of the Spring and Autumn period. He had 9,000 followers, who marched at their will through the kingdom, assailing and oppressing the different princes. They dug through walls and broke into houses; they drove away people's cattle and horses; they carried off people's wives and daughters.

Dao Zhi's legends were documented in much pre-Qin literature, such as in the works of Zhuangzi, Mencius, and Xunzi. However, his identification as prostitution god was just begun since Ming dynasty, It was recorded in chapter 72 of Xiaozan 笑赞 (written by Zhao Nanxing), chapter 8 of Zhan Gui Chuan 斩鬼传, as well as other Ming-Qing literatures.

Baimei Shen is also identified with Ling Lun, the legendary music founder in Yellow Emperor era. Since prostitution in ancient China was often associated with music, the founder of music was considered the god of prostitution.
