= Yanzi chunqiu =

Ancient Chinese text

Yanzi Chunqiu
- Author: (trad.) Yan Ying
- Original title: 晏子春秋
- Language: Classical Chinese
- Subject: Narrative stories of Yan Ying
- Published: c. 3rd century BC
- Publication place: Qi, Zhou dynasty China

Yanzi Chunqiu
- Chinese: 晏子春秋
- Literal meaning: "Master Yan's Account of Springs and Autumns"
Transcriptions
Standard Mandarin
- Hanyu Pinyin: Yànzǐ chūnqiū
- Gwoyeu Romatzyh: Yanntzyy chuenchiou
- Wade–Giles: Yen^{4}-tzŭ^{3} ch'un^{1}-ch'iu^{1}
- IPA: [jɛ̂n.tsɨ̀ ʈʂʰwə́n.tɕʰjóʊ]
Yue: Cantonese
- Yale Romanization: Aan-jí chēun-chāu
- Jyutping: Aan^{3}-zi^{2} ceon^{1}-cau^{1}
- IPA: [an˧.tsi˧˥ tsʰɵn˥.tsʰɐw˥]
Southern Min
- Tâi-lô: Àn-tsú tshun-tshiu
Old Chinese
- Baxter–Sagart (2014): *ʔˤe[n]-s tsəʔ tʰun tsʰiw

The Yanzi chunqiu ("Yanzi Annals" or "Annals of Master Yan") is an ancient Chinese text dating to the Warring States period (475–221 BC) that contains a collection of stories, speeches, and remonstrations attributed to Yan Ying, a famous official from the State of Qi who served Duke Jing of Qi (r. 547–489 BC). It comprises 215 stories arranged into eight chapters. The first six chapters contain accounts of Yan Ying's remonstrations with the rulers he served. The seventh chapter contains variants on stories from the first six chapters, and the eighth chapter has anti-Confucian episodes that the Han dynasty imperial librarian Liu Xiang—who compiled the received version of the Yanzi chunqiu in the late 1st century BC—considered to be inconsistent with the Chinese Classics.

The Yanzi chunqiu incorporates themes from both Confucianism and Mohism and does not fit into any single Chinese philosophical tradition.

== History ==
A page from a Ming dynasty printed edition of Yanzi chunqiu

The first mention of the Yanzi chunqiu in a received work appears in the 62nd chapter of the ancient historian Sima Qian's late 2nd century BC work Records of the Grand Historian (Shiji 史記), the first of China's 24 dynastic histories. Sima states that many scholars of his generation had copies of the text, but does not mention any author for it. Contemporary sources indicate that, like many Chinese texts, the Yanzi chunqiu circulated in a variety of different versions and collections. In the late 1st century BC, the Han dynasty imperial librarian Liu Xiang edited 30 total Yanzi chunqiu chapters down to the eight chapters that compose the modern received text.

In 1972, a large cache of bamboo slip writings known as the Yinqueshan Han slips were discovered in a Han dynasty tomb near Linyi, Shandong Province. Among the slips, which date to the early 2nd century BC, were 18 stories from the Yanzi chunqiu, thus confirming historical accounts of the Yanzi chunqiu's early existence.

== Content ==
The Yanzi chunqiu comprises 215 stories arranged into eight chapters. The first six "inner" chapters contain accounts of Yan Ying's remonstrations with the rulers he served, and the seventh chapter contains variants on stories from the first six chapters, while the eighth chapter has anti-Confucian episodes that Liu Xiang considered to be inconsistent with the Chinese Classics.

== Themes ==
The Yanzi chunqiu has proven difficult to classify into one single philosophical tradition, and much of the traditional Chinese scholarship on it has focused on its classification. The bibliographical catalogs of the early dynastic histories list it as a Confucian ("Ruist") work, but in the early 8th century the poet and scholar Liu Zongyuan strongly argued that the Yanzi was actually a Mohist work, given its numerous references to such hallmark Mohist terms as "universal/impartial caring" (jiān'ài 兼愛), "opposition to music" (fēi yuè 非樂), and "frugality" (jié yòng 節用). Liu recognized that Yan Ying could not have been a follower of Mozi, which would be anachronistic, but believed that the Yanzi was written later by one of Mozi's followers who was familiar with the traditions of the State of Qi. Liu's view that the Yanzi was a Mohist work was echoed by many subsequent Chinese scholars. Zhang Chunyi (張純一; 1871–1955), one of the leading Mohism experts of the modern era, described the Yanzi as "60 to 70% Mohist and 30 to 40% Confucian."

== Commentaries ==
In the late Qing Dynasty, Su Yu (蘇輿) and Zhang Chunyi wrote Yanzi chunqiu jiaozhu (Chinese: 晏子春秋校注), and in modern times, Wu Zeyu (吳則虞) wrote Yanzi chunqiu jishi (Chinese: 晏子春秋集釋).

== Translations ==
The first complete Western-language translation of the Yanzi chunqiu was published in 2016, and only a few English translations exist.

- Milburn, Olivia, trans. (2016), The Spring and Autumn Annals of Master Yan, Leiden: Brill.
- Ariel, Yoav (2018), The Spring and Autumn Annals of Master Yan, A bilingual edition in 2 vols, Beijing: Renmin University Press.

The following contain partial translations:

- Kao, George (1946), Chinese Wit and Humor, pp. 37–46; reprinted in 1974 by Sterling Publishing Company.
- (in German) Lippe, Aschwin (1961), "Drei Geschichte aus dem 'Frühling und Herbst des Yen Ying'" ("Three Stories from the 'Spring and Autumn of Yan Ying'"), in Studia Sino-Altaica, Festschrift für Erich Haenisch.
- Watson, Burton (1962), Early Chinese Literature, New York: Columbia University Press, p. 186.
- (in German) Holzer, Rainer (1983), Yen-tzu und das Yen-tzu ch’un-ch’iu, Frankfurt: Peter Lang, 1983.

In contrast to the dearth of Western translations, at least five Japanese translations have been published. The two most commonly used Japanese translations are:

- Yamada, Taku 山田琢, trans. (1969), Anshi shunjū 晏子春秋 ("Yanzi chunqiu"), Tokyo: Meitoku shuppansha.
- Yanaka, Shin'ichi 谷中信一, trans. (2000–01), Anshi shunjū 晏子春秋 ("Yanzi chunqiu"), 2 vols., Tokyo: Meiji shoin.

== See also ==
- Zihui (congshu)
