= Wang Qi (physician) =

Chinese andrologist

- 王琦
- Born: February 1943 (age 83); Gaoyou, Jiangsu, China
- Scientific career
- Fields: Andrology
- Institutions: Beijing University of Chinese Medicine

Wang Qi (Chinese: 王琦; pinyin: Wáng Qí; born February 1943) is a Chinese andrologist who is a professor and doctoral supervisor at Beijing University of Chinese Medicine.

== Biography ==
Wang was born in Gaoyou, Jiangsu, in February 1943.

== Honours and awards ==
- 1997 National Famous and Old Expert in Traditional Chinese Medicine
- 1998 National Medical Master
- 2013 Science and Technology Progress Award of the Ho Leung Ho Lee Foundation
- 2014 Honorary Professor of Hong Kong Baptist University
- 2014 Honorary Professor of Macao University of Science and Technology
- November 22, 2019 Member of the Chinese Academy of Engineering (CAE)
