= Zhongli Chun =

Chinese occultist and consort of the King Xuan of Qi (r. 342–324 BC)

Zhongli Chun (Chinese: 鍾離春, fl. 342 BC), commonly known as Zhong Wuyan in legends (Chinese: 鍾無鹽／鍾無艷), was a Chinese occultist and consort of the King Xuan of Qi (r. 342–324 BC).

She is described as an "ugly" woman, a Qin-subject of the age of forty, when she approached the king and successfully offered herself in marriage.

She is known for allegedly having the ability to make herself invisible, an art she demonstrated to the king and which attracted his attention. She is famous for offering the king the Four Dangers threatening the safety of his state. The king was impressed and reformed his state in accordance with her advice.

== Legacy ==
She is included in the Biographies of Exemplary Women (Lienü zhuan).
