= Duke Kang of Qi =

Ruler of the State of Qi from 404 to 386 BC

Duke Kang of Qi 齊康公

Duke of Qi
- Reign: 404–386 BC
- Predecessor: Duke Xuan of Jiang Qi
- Successor: Duke Tai of Tian Qi
- Died: 379 BC
Names
- Ancestral name: Jiāng (姜); Clan name: Lǚ (呂); Given name: Dài (貸)
Posthumous name
- Duke Kang (康公)
- House: Jiang
- Dynasty: Jiang Qi
- Father: Duke Xuan of Jiang Qi

Duke Kang of Qi (Chinese: 齊康公; pinyin: Qí Kāng Gōng), personal name Lü Dai, was the 32nd and last ruler of the Jiang Qi state from 404 BC to 386 BC. The throne of Qi was thereafter usurped by the Tian clan, thus ending the Jiang Qi (姜齊) dynasty and establishing the Tian Qi (田齊) dynasty.

== Reign ==
Duke Kang succeeded his father, Duke Xuan of Qi, who died in 405 BC after 51 years of reign as titular ruler of Qi. Since Tian Heng killed Duke Xuan's uncle Duke Jian of Qi in 481 BC, the leaders of the Tian clan had been the de facto rulers of Qi.

Tian He was leader of the Tian clan during Duke Kang's reign. With the lobbying of Marquis Wu of Wei, in 386 BC King An of Zhou, the nominal ruler of all China, officially recognized Tian He as ruler of Qi, ending more than six centuries of rule by the House of Jiang. Tian He became the first de jure ruler of Qi from the House of Tian, and is posthumously known as Duke Tai of Tian Qi.

After Tian He ascended the throne of Qi, he exiled Duke Kang to Zhifu Island in present-day Shandong Province, where he lived for seven more years and died in 379 BC.

Duke Kang of Qi House of Jiang Died: 379 BC
Regnal titles
| Preceded by Duke Xuan of Qi | — TITULAR — Duke of Qi; 404–386 BC; Reason for succession failure: House of Tian in control | Succeeded by Duke Tai of Tian Qi |
