= An Ruzi =

Ruler of the Chinese state of Qi in 489 BC

Lü Tu 呂荼

Ruler of Qi
- Reign: 489 BC
- Predecessor: Duke Jing
- Successor: Duke Dao
- Died: 489 BC
Names
- Ancestral name: Jiāng (姜); Clan name: Lǚ (呂); Given name: Tú (荼)
- House: Jiang
- Dynasty: Jiang Qi
- Father: Duke Jing
- Mother: Yu Si (鬻姒)

An Ruzi (Chinese: 安孺子; pinyin: Ān Rúzǐ), also called Yan Ruzi (Chinese: 晏孺子; pinyin: Yàn Rúzǐ), personal name Lü Tu, was the 27th ruler of the Jiang Qi state for 10 months until his death in 489 BC.

He was subsequently killed by Viscount Xi of Tian (田僖子), who then installed An Ruzi's older brother, Duke Dao, to the Qi throne.

== Designation as Crown Prince ==
Prince Tu was the youngest son of Duke Jing of Qi, and his mother was Duke Jing's favourite concubine Yu Si, who was from the minor state of Chunyu. In the summer of 490 BC, the 58th year of Duke Jing's reign, the crown prince of Qi died. Although Duke Jing had at least five other grown sons, he decided to make Prince Tu the new crown prince. Because Prince Tu was a young boy and his mother was of a lowly status, Duke Jing ordered the ministers Guo Xia of the Guo clan and Gao Zhang of the Gao clan to support Prince Tu and exile the other princes to the remote city of Lai.

== Reign ==
Duke Jing died soon afterward in the autumn of 490 BC. Guo and Gao installed Prince Tu on the throne, and the other princes escaped to the nearby states of Wey and Lu. However, the next year the Tian and Bao clans, led by Tian Qi and Bao Mu, staged a coup d'etat and defeated the Gao and Guo clans. Tian Qi brought back Prince Yangsheng, an older half-brother of Prince Tu, from Lu and installed him on the throne, to be known as Duke Dao of Qi. Bao Mu was reluctant to depose Prince Tu but dared not oppose Tian. Duke Dao soon killed Prince Tu, who is posthumously known as An Ruzi. The Tian clan would from then on increasingly dominate the power of Qi, eventually replacing the House of Jiang as rulers of Qi in 386 BC.

An Ruzi House of Jiang Died: 489 BC
Regnal titles
Preceded by Duke Jing of Qi	Duke of Qi; 489 BC	Succeeded by Duke Dao of Qi
