= King Wei of Qi =

Ruler of Qi between 356 BC and 320 BC

King Wei of Qi 齊威王

Ruler of Qi
- Reign: 356–320 BC
- Predecessor: Duke Huan of Tian Qi
- Successor: King Xuan of Qi
- Born: c. 378 BC
- Died: 320 BC
- Spouse: Queen Wei
- Issue: King Xuan of Qi; Tian Ying (田嬰), Lord Jingguo (靖郭君)
Names
- Ancestral name: Guī (媯); Clan name: Tián (田); Given name: Yīnqí (因齊) or Yīngqí (嬰齊)
Posthumous name
- King Wei (威王)
- House: Gui
- Dynasty: Tian Qi
- Father: Duke Huan of Tian Qi

King Wei of Qi (Chinese: 齊威王; pinyin: Qí Wēi Wáng), personal name Tian Yinqi (田因齊), was the fourth monarch of the Tian Qi state, reigning from 356 BC to 320 BC, or according to another source from 378 BC to 343 BC. He was the first monarch of Qi to style himself "king".

== Life ==
In the Intrigues of the Warring States, the strategist Su Qin is quoted as telling the king of Qin: "Kings Wei and Xuan of Qi were the worthiest rulers of their age. Their power was great and their lands were broad. Their states were wealthy and their citizens capable. Their generals were aggressive and their troops strong."

King Wei was judicious and measured in his actions toward his subordinates. At one point he was told repeatedly by his spies that one of his generals, Zhangzi, had surrendered to the enemy, Qin. King Wei refused to believe that Zhangzi had deserted. Sure enough, "a short while later it was reported that Qi had won a great victory. The king of Qin proclaimed himself a vassal of the western borders and made his apologies to Qi." King Wei said that he always knew Zhangzi was faithful and cited this story in his defence.

According to another story, King Wei proclaimed that "To all ministers, officers and citizens who criticize my faults in front of me, they will get the highest reward; those who remonstrate with me in writing will be given the next highest reward, and to those who overhear criticism of me and convey it to my ears will go the least reward." It was said that initially, "the doorway to the king's chamber looked like a marketplace" but after a year, "none who spoke to the king had petitions to present" [because the problems had already been solved]. "When [the states of] Yan, Zhao, Han and Wei heard of this they all came to court at Qi."

King Wei employed Sun Bin as chief military advisor. Sun Bin had been punished with mutilation of his knees in Wei at the instigation of his enemy Pang Juan. King Wei's commander Tian Ji recruited him to come to Qi. As Sun Bin could not sit on a horse, he refused when King Wei offered him the actual command of the army. Sun Bin wrote Sun Bin's Art of War, in which King Wei and Tian Ji question Sun Bin on strategy and tactics. Sun Bin was influential in devising the strategy for the Qi triumph at the Battle of Maling in 342 BC, which considerably weakened the rival state of Wei. Pang Juan died there. "Late in his reign, he sent out armies against Qin and Zhao."

King Wei was the caster of the ritual bronze vessel bearing the earliest attestation of the Yellow Emperor, the Chen Hou Yinqi dui (陳侯因齊敦).

His son Tian Ying (田嬰) was the father of Lord Mengchang.

== Family ==
Queens:

- Queen Wei (威后)

Concubines:

- Wey Ji, of the Ji clan of Wey (衛姬 姬姓), the mother of Prince Jiaoshi
- Yu Ji, of the Yu clan (虞姬 虞姓), personal name Juanzhi (娟之)

Sons:

- First son, Crown Prince Pijiang (太子辟疆; 350–319 BC), ruled as King Xuan of Qi from 319 to 301 BC
- Second son, Prince Ying (公子嬰), the father of Lord Mengchang
  - Known by his title, Lord Jingguo (靖郭君)
  - Served as the Prime Minister (相) of Qi
  - Granted the fiefdom of Xue (薛) in 322 BC
- Prince Jiaoshi (公子郊师)

King Wei of Qi House of Tian Born: c. 378 BC Died: 320 BC
Regnal titles
Preceded by Duke Huan of Tian Qi as Duke of Qi	King of Qi; 356–320 BC	Succeeded by King Xuan of Qi
