= Jian of Qi =

King of Qi from 264 to 221 BC

Tian Jian 田建

King of Qi
- Reign: 264–221 BC
- Predecessor: King Xiang
- Successor: None
Names
- Ancestral name: Guī (媯); Clan name: Tián (田); Given name: Jiàn (建)
- House: Gui
- Dynasty: Tian Qi
- Father: King Xiang

Tian Jian, commonly known as "Jian, King of Qi" (Chinese: 齊王建; pinyin: Qí Wáng Jiàn), was the eighth and last monarch of the Tian Qi state.

== Life ==
Tian Jian succeeded his father, King Xiang, who died in 265 BC. He reigned for 44 years. At the time he acceded to the throne, Qi was one of the wealthiest states, and it was on the seacoast far from the most aggressive state, Qin. For years, Tian Jian's mother acted as his advisor. On her deathbed she wanted to tell her son which ministers she thought were the best. But when the writing materials arrived she could no longer tell him. After she died, Hou Sheng (后勝) became his prime minister. It was alleged by some sources that Hou Sheng was in the pay of the state of Qin.

One famous anecdote is that after the Battle of Changping in 260 BC, in which, according to the historian Sima Qian, 450,000 soldiers of the state of Zhao were killed by the Qin army, King Jian was advised: "Zhao is a hedge that protects Qi... just as the lips protect the teeth. When the lips are gone, the teeth become cold....Go to the aid of Zhao!" However, the king did nothing; during his reign he tried to stay out of wars, as the future First Emperor Qin Shihuang attacked all the states around him.

The kingdom of Qi was the only opponent of Qin after Qin Shi Huang conquered every other state. King Jian and his prime minister Hou Sheng (后勝), a relation of Jian's wife, sent the Qi army to the western border of Qi to protect the country; but Qin general Wang Ben (王賁), son of Wang Jian, attacked Qi from the north instead and conquered it in 221 BC, completing Qin's unification of China.

Tian Jian was captured with his entire court. In one story, the king went to Qin voluntarily, resisting the urging of his loyal counselor, after the defeat, because Qin Shi Huang had promised him a large property of 500 li. Instead, when he arrived in Qin, he was sent to a remote area with his wife and daughter, where he starved to death. The Qi people made a sarcastic ballad to commemorate him. "O pine trees! O cypress trees! Making the king of Qi die in a common village–this was a guest who was good at adapting!"

Later in the Han dynasty, the official Wang Mang usurped the emperor and took the throne. Wang Mang proclaimed to have descended from Jian of Qi (through Tian An from the Eighteen Kingdoms).

Jian of Qi House of Tian
Regnal titles
Preceded by King Xiang of Qi	King of Qi; 264–221 BC	Conquered by Qin
