= King Xiang of Qi =

King Xiang of Qi 齊襄王

King of Qi
- Reign: 283–265 BC
- Predecessor: King Min
- Successor: Tian Jian
- Died: 265 BC
- Spouse: Queen Jun
- Issue: Tian Jian; Tian Jia (田假)
Names
- Ancestral name: Guī (媯); Clan name: Tián (田); Given name: Fǎzhāng (法章)
Posthumous name
- King Xiang (襄王)
- House: Gui
- Dynasty: Tian Qi
- Father: King Min

King Xiang of Qi (Chinese: 齊襄王; pinyin: Qí Xiāng Wáng), personal name Tian Fazhang, was the seventh monarch of the Tian Qi state from 283 BC to 265 BC. He was succeeded to the throne by his son, Tian Jian.

== Life ==
At the time of King Min of Qi, the kingdom was invaded and the king himself was captured and killed in 284 BC. His son, Fazhang, fled, changing his name, and "became a servant in the home of the Grand Astrologer." There, the astrologer's daughter met and fell in love with him. Later, some of the loyal officers of Qi put Fazhang on the throne, and he made the astrologer's daughter, his queen; she was the mother of his successor. She is known as Queen Jun and was said to be a wise and honorable woman who helped run the affairs of state. However, her father, Ji, was angry that she had married without his consent and refused to see his daughter ever again.

King Xiang reigned for 19 years and died in 265 BC. He was succeeded by his son, Tian Jian.

== Family ==
Queens:

- Queen Jun, of the Hou clan of Qi (君後 後姓; d. 249 BC), a daughter of Taishi Jiao (太史敫); the mother of Prince Jian

Sons:

- Prince Jian (公子建; 280–221 BC), ruled as the King of Qi from 264 to 221 BC
- Prince Jia (公子假; 275–205 BC)

King Xiang of Qi House of Tian Died: 265 BC
Regnal titles
Preceded by King Min of Qi	King of Qi; 283–265 BC	Succeeded by King Jian of Qi
