= Tian Heng =

Tian Heng 田橫 (Chinese)
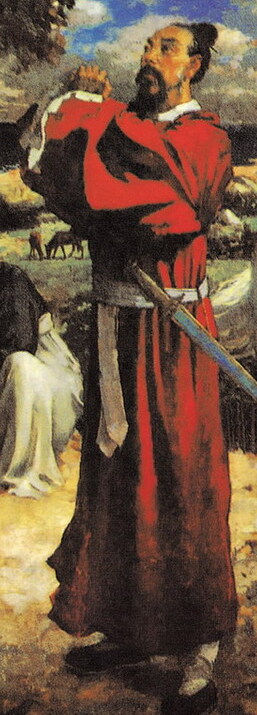
- From Tian Heng's Five Hundred Heroes (1930) by Xu Beihong

King of Qi (齊王)
- Pretense: 202 BC
- Predecessor: Tian Guang
- Died: 202 BC; Shixiang (尸鄉), Henan Commandery, Han China

Tian Heng (Chinese: 田橫; pinyin: Tián Héng; died 202 BC) was a member of the Tian royal house of Qi who supported a rebellion led by Tian Rong, his elder brother, against the Qin dynasty and later against both Xiang Yu and Liu Bang during the Chu–Han Contention. Upon the conquest of the reestablished Kingdom of Qi by Han, Tian Heng proclaimed himself King of Qi and led his followers to an island in resistance. When Liu Bang demanded that he go to Luoyang to surrender to him, Tian Heng killed himself in an act of defiance. His followers on the island, upon hearing the news, killed themselves too.

== Life ==
Tian Heng had followed his elder brother Tian Rong during the late-Qin rebellions and the subsequent Chu-Han Contention. They had served multiple claimants to the throne of the Warring States kingdom of Qi before Tian Rong rose up in rebellion and claimed the throne for himself. Seeing Tian Rong as a threat to the post-Qin order that he had established, Xiang Yu attacked Qi and defeated Tian Rong, who was killed. Xiang Yu then installed Tian Jia (田假), the younger brother of Tian Jian, the king, but Tian Heng's forces expelled Tian Jia. Tian Heng subsequently made Tian Rong's son Tian Guang (田廣) the new king in 205 BC.

In 203 BC, Liu Bang, the King of Han, sent Li Yiji, one of his advisors, to Qi to persuade the King of Qi to surrender to Han upon his own request. He managed to do so, but Han General Han Xin, who had previously been ordered by Liu Bang to conquer Qi and stationed his army near the Qi border, chose to attack Qi anyways even after hearing the news of Qi surrender upon the advice of his advisor Kuai Che (蒯徹). Tian Guang and Tian Heng, greatly angered by Li Yiji's apparent ruse, boiled him alive.

The Qi army, caught off guard, was swiftly defeated by Han Xin's forces; the Qi capital Linzi soon fell. Despite assistance from Chu, Tian Guang was defeated by the Han forces, captured, and killed. Meanwhile, Tian Heng proclaimed himself the King of Qi and fled to Peng Yue, King of Liang, whose forces had been outside the complete control of either Chu or Han at that point.

After Xiang Yu's final defeat at Gaixia, Liu Bang proclaimed himself emperor. Tian Heng led his followers to an island in resistance. Liu Bang, seeing Tian Heng's influence in Qi and potential capability of inciting a rebellion there, opined to pardon and summon him. Tian Heng declined, claiming fear of retribution for killing Li Yiji by his brother Li Shang, who was a Han general by that point. Liu Bang threatened Li Shang with familial execution if he dared to harm Tian Heng while sending Tian Heng a message to let him know of this action, but not without threatening Tian Heng to answer his summons immediately with military force.

Tian Heng then made his way to Luoyang, where Liu Bang was located, with two retainers. When they arrived at a carriage station at Shixiang (尸鄉), not far away from Luoyang, Tian Heng stopped to enter while asking the accompanying envoy to wait outside with the excuse of having to wash himself before meeting the emperor.

Once inside, Tian Heng said to his followers:

Once the king of Han and I both faced south and called ourselves sovereigns. Now the king of Han has become the Son of Heaven, and I have become a captive fugitive. How great would be my shame were I to face north and acknowledge him as my ruler! Moreover, I would be serving him side by side with Li Shang, a man whose elder brother I boiled to death. Even though Li Shang does not dare to harm me out of fear for the emperor's orders, could I help but feel shame in my heart? The only reason His Majesty wishes to see me is so that he may for once have a look at my face, that is all. Since he is now in [Luoyang], if you cut off my head and hasten with it the thirty li from here to there, my features will not have decayed and he may still observe them.

Having said these words, Tian Heng cut his own throat. Upon hearing this news, Liu Bang wept in admiration and ordered that Tian Heng be buried with royal honors, after which the two followers of Tian Heng each dug a hole next to Tian Heng's grave, cut their own throats, and fell into the holes to follow Tian Heng into the afterworld. Liu Bang then sent an envoy to Tian Heng's other followers to request that they surrender, but they killed themselves too upon hearing the news of their master's death.

== Legacy ==
An island in the Yellow Sea off the coast of Jimo is named Tian Heng Island (田横岛). It is reputably the island that Tian Heng and his followers sought refuge on, though there is no archaeological evidence confirming this.
