= Yan Ying =

Chinese philosopher and politician (c. 578–500 BC)

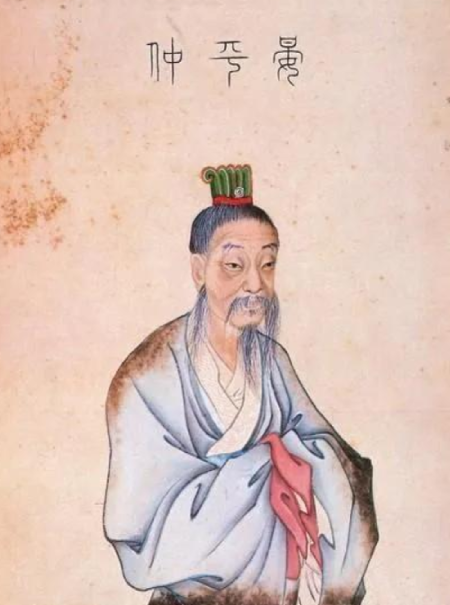
- The caption is 晏平仲 in seal script, written in the Classical Chinese style from right to left
- Born: 578 BC; Ancient Yiwei (modern day Gaomi, Shandong)
- Died: 500 BC; Zibo, Shandong
- Occupation: Prime minister of the state of Qi
- Writing career
- Period: Spring and Autumn
- Subjects: Philosopher, statesman, diplomat
- Notable work: Yanzi Chunqiu

Yan Ying
- Traditional Chinese: 晏嬰
- Simplified Chinese: 晏婴
Transcriptions
Standard Mandarin
- Hanyu Pinyin: Yàn Yīng
- Wade–Giles: Yen Ying

Yanzi
- Traditional Chinese: 晏子
- Simplified Chinese: 晏子
Transcriptions
Standard Mandarin
- Wade–Giles: Yen-tzu
- Tongyong Pinyin: Yàn zǐ

Ping Zhong
- Chinese: 平仲
Transcriptions
Standard Mandarin
- Hanyu Pinyin: Píng Zhòng
- Wade–Giles: P'ing Chung

Yan Ying (c. 578–500 BC), better known as Yanzi, was a Chinese philosopher and minister of the state of Qi during China's Spring and Autumn period. An elder contemporary of Confucius, Yanzi has been described as "by far the most creative thinker of the Chunqiu age". He is traditionally credited with the Warring States text Yanzi Chunqiu, the Annals of Master Yan.

== Names ==
Yan Ying is written as 晏嬰 in traditional Chinese characters and as 晏婴 in modern simplified ones. The modern Mandarin pronunciation of the name is transcribed as Yàn Yīng in pinyin and Yen Ying in Wade-Giles. His usual name Yanzi literally means "Master Yan". During his lifetime, he used the courtesy name Zhong and, after his death, he was awarded the posthumous title of "Ping" (Chinese: 平), causing him to also be known as Ping Zhong in Chinese sources.

== Life ==
Yan Ying was born around the year 578 BC in what is now Gaomi, Shandong, in China. He was the son of Yan Ruo (晏弱), a Qi minister of state, and succeeded to his father's post in 556 BC on his father's death. He was said to be short of stature and very ugly but an able debater with a nimble mind. It was because of these skills that he was often dispatched to other states to serve as a diplomat, often defending the interests of Qi against other states. Over a career spanning four decades, he served as minister and advisor to three dukes of Qi, posthumously known as Dukes Ling, Zhuang, and Jing. Some accounts of his diplomatic missions passed into Chinese folklore and proverbial sayings, although their exact historicity is uncertain.

When Yan Ying was mortally ill around the year 500 BC, he had a letter sealed in a hole drilled in a pillar of his home, which he told his wife to ensure his son would read once he had grown. Once retrieved, the letter read "Do not exhaust the cloth and silk, for you would lack for clothes. Do not exhaust the livestock, for you would lack for labour. Do not exhaust worthy men, for the government could not be staffed. Do not exhaust the state's resources, for the state could not provide for its people." Yanzi's tomb is located in Zibo in what is now Shandong Province.

== Notable incidents ==
=== Death of Duke Zhuang ===
In the fifth Chinese month of 548 BC, Duke Zhuang was killed by Cui Zhu's men for having an adulterous relationship with Tang Jiang. The duke was shot in the back by an arrow while trying to escape by climbing a wall. Cui Zhu at the time was an extremely powerful minister of the state of Qi and detested Yan Ying. It was Cui who had installed Duke Zhuang onto the throne. As soon as Yan Ying heard the news, he stormed into the premises of Cui Zhu without guards and without any regard of his own safety. He took off his hat and started to beat his chest and stomp his feet while approaching the Duke's body. He wailed and cried. Afterwards, he picked himself up and left without regard for anything around him. Cui Zhu's own men wanted to kill Yan Ying on the spot for trespassing but were stopped. Cui Zhu noted that the people looked up to him and that killing him would only cause Cui to lose popularity.

After assassination of the Duke, Cui Zhu installed the duke's half-brother Chujiu on the throne, known to history as Duke Jing. In return, Duke Jing appointed Cui Zhu as the right prime minister and Qing Feng as the left. Cui also coerced everyone to take an oath to be loyal and obedient to him. Any disobedience would result in death. Yan Ying never complied, but Cui Zhu was unable to kill him because of the opinion of the people. In 545 BC, Cui Zhu was betrayed by Qing Feng. He tried to bribe Yan Ying with lordship over more than 60 households in Beidian but Yanzi refused. Cui and his wife committed suicide.

=== Visiting the state of Chu ===
Prior to visiting the state of Chu, its leader King Ling wanted to humiliate Yan Ying. Knowing that Yan Ying was short, the King instructed a smaller entrance to be made adjacent to the city gates. Upon arrival, Yan Ying was asked to use the smaller side entrance but he refused, saying "Only when you are entering a city run by dogs would you use a dog door. I have arrived at the state of Chu, so I should not use a dog door."

After entering the city, the king met Yan Ying and asked conceitedly, "Is there no one else left in the state of Qi to send? They actually sent you as the envoy." Yan Ying replied, "Our capital Linzi is full of people. Sleeves are raised to cover the sun. Along with every wipe of sweat, there is a small drizzle. Pedestrians walk shoulder to shoulder and toe to heel. How can you state that Qi has no people?" This brought the reply, "If that is the case, then why did they send you?" to which Yanzi answered, "Qi has a very particular way of selecting the places their envoys are sent. Those that are bright and competent are sent to dignified and respectable places. Those that are incompetent are designated to failed states. I am the most incompetent one, which is why I have been sent here to Chu." A long silence ensued while the subjects of the King squinted at Yan Ying.

The king and several of his ministers had another plan to humiliate Yan Ying. Subjects were to parade past him with criminals alleged to be from Qi. King Ling invited Yanzi to drink with him and, as they were happily discussing matters, two officers brought forth a criminal. The king asked, "Why is this man tied up? What did he do?" One of the officers replied, "He is from Qi and has committed theft." The king looked at Yan Ying, asking, "Are the people from Qi inclined to steal?" Yanzi rose from his seat and replied, "I have heard that the oranges to the south of the Huai River are large and sweet. However, when cultivated north of the river, they become shrunken and bitter. It's the same with its leaves and the taste of the fruit changes entirely. All of this merely because the soil and surrounding environment is different. By the same analogy, the people of Qi—when in Qi—live in peace and work hard. In contrast, when in Chu, they have to resort to thievery. Does this mean the conditions in Chu cause its citizens to steal?" The King laughed and said, "Sages are not to be joked with. I have only made a fool of myself." This story popularised the saying "southern oranges are bitter in the north" (南橘北枳, nán jú běi zhǐ).

By the end of Yan Ying's visit, the king was so abashed that he is recorded as having personally accompanied Yanzi back home to Qi by way of apology.

=== Subduing the enemy with a wine vessel ===
Towards the middle of the Warring States period, the state of Jin—at the time one of the most powerful states—was conspiring to attack the state of Qi. To better gauge the situation of the state of Qi, the duke of Jin sent Fan Zhao, one of his senior officials, on a diplomatic mission. The duke of Qi received and entertained Fan Zhao with a banquet. During the banquet, Fan Zhao—feigning to be drunk—asked for another cup of wine as his cup was missing. Out of courtesy, the Duke of Qi—who actually was drunk—immediately asked a server to pour wine into his own cup and let the guest drink from it. Zhao proceeded to drink from it and then returned the cup to the Duke. The custom of the time was that each should have drunk only from his own cup. Fan Zhao's use of the Duke's cup was a great disrespect to the state of Qi and it was a deliberate test to observe the reactions of his subjects. Yan Ying saw through this and immediately asked a servant to replace the Duke's cup.

Upon Fan Zhao's return to his state, he reported this incident to the duke of Jin and suggested that it was not the right time to invade Qi. An attack would be futile as the state of Qi still had virtuous subjects. Based on this advice, the duke of Jin decided to not invade. The Chinese idiom of "subduing the enemy with a wine vessel" (折衝樽俎, zhé chōng zūn zǔ) is based on this story and has the meaning of the importance of using diplomatic negotiations to avert war. Confucius praised Yan Ying for his actions and stated that, "by upholding one's own wine vessel, enemies from thousands of miles away can be defeated".

=== Valuing birds over warriors ===
A picture stone 78 x 128 cm in size titled 晏子見齊景公 (literal translation: Yan Zi meeting with Duke Jing of Qi)

Duke Jing was an admirer of birds. So he employed Zhu Zou (Chinese: 烛邹, Zhú Zōu) to raise birds for his enjoyment. On one occasion, Zhu lost the Duke's favourite bird. The Duke became annoyed and ordered Zhu to be put to death. Yan Ying heard of this and became worried. According to Qi's laws, the crime that Zhu committed was certainly not punishable by death. However, he knew that the duke was arrogant and stubborn. To preserve the integrity of the laws of the kingdom, Yan Ying decided to intervene. He went to the Duke's court and suggested that Zhu Zou committed three crimes and that he would like to recite them to Zhu face-to-face so that he understood in what ways he broke the law and for what reasons he was going to die. The duke approved. Two warriors brought Zhu to the palace before the Duke. Yan Ying knelt down to publicly denounced Zhu and said, "You were asked to take care of your majesty's birds, but yet you let one escape. This is your first crime. Because of one bird, you angered your majesty, this is your second crime. Once the other six kingdoms hear about this, they will think of our majesty as being outrageously unreasonable for valuing birds over warriors, this is your third crime." Yan Ying turned to the Duke and said, "Your majesty, he may be killed now." Duke Jing started as if he had just awoken from a dream and said, "No need to kill him any more. I have understood the words of wisdom." The Duke proceeded to approach Zhu Zou and personally untied him.

=== Killing three warriors with two peaches ===
The affair of Yan Ying "killing three warriors with two peaches" (Chinese: 二桃殺三士, èr taó shā sān shì) comes from the Yanzi Annals. Duke Jing of Qi had three generals—Gongsun Jie, Tian Kaijiang, and Gu Yezi—in his employ. While the three were all capable and accomplished warriors, their arrogance towards other ministers convinced Yan Ying that they would have to be removed.

He therefore devised a ruse where two peaches were presented—purportedly as a reward—to the three generals. The two with the greatest accomplishments would get a peach each. Gongsun Jie and Tian Kaijiang promptly reported their accomplishments and each took a peach, but Gu Yezi angrily rebuked them and listed his own accomplishments. The first two agreed that Gu's accomplishments were the most notable and, out of shame at having taken gifts they did not deserve, returned the peaches and killed themselves. Gu Yezi, shamed at having killed two colleagues by his boasting, then killed himself too, removing three major threats to the stability of the Qi court.

The story has in turn become a Chinese saying, denoting the use of ruses and stratagems to remove opponents.

== Works and legacy ==
The book Yanzi Chunqiu, compiled during the Warring States period (roughly 475–221 BC), includes stories of Yan Ying's advice to three Dukes of Qi and of his life and times. A chapter of Sima Qian's Records of the Grand Historian is devoted to him and Guan Zhong.
