= King Xuan of Qi =

King of Chinese state of Qi from 319 to 301 BC

King Xuan of Qi 齊宣王
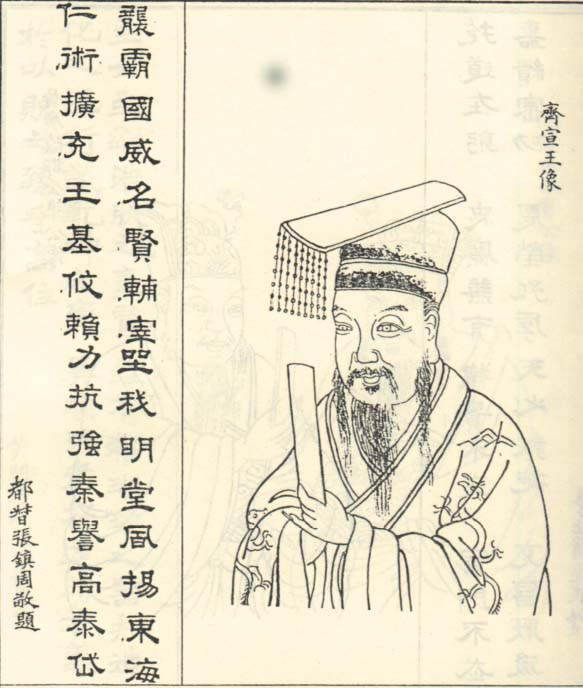

King of Qi
- Reign: 319–301 BC
- Predecessor: King Xuan
- Successor: King Min
- Died: 301 BC
- Spouse: Queen Xuan; Zhongli Chun
- Issue: King Min
Names
- Ancestral name: Guī (媯); Clan name: Tián (田); Given name: Bìjiāng (辟疆)
Posthumous name
- King Xuan (宣王)
- House: Gui
- Dynasty: Tian Qi
- Father: King Wei

King Xuan of Qi (Chinese: 齊宣王; pinyin: Qí Xuān Wáng), personal name Tian Bijiang, was the fifth monarch of the Tian Qi state from 319 BC to 301 BC.

King Xuan succeeded his father, King Wei, who died in 320 BC after 37 years of reign. King Xuan reigned for 19 years and died in 301 BC. He was succeeded by his son, King Min.

In traditional Chinese historiography, King Xuan is best known for receiving advice of Mencius. He is generally credited with the establishment of the Jixia Academy, within which scholars such as Yin Wen would study. Yin Wen would notably give back to King Xuan, engaging in discourse with him and advocating for wu wei-based state management.

Preserved fragments of the Analects of Lu (a now-lost regional variant of the Lunyu) suggest that Xuan favored Confucian doctrine in matters of governance but appreciated Mohist arguments on frugality and merit-based appointments.

== Family ==
Queens:

- Queen Xuan (宣后; d. 312 BC)
- Lady, of the Zhongli lineage of Qi (鍾離氏), personal name Chun (春)

In folk tales, King Xuan also had a concubine called Xia Yingchun (夏迎春). King Xuan was portrayed to only reach Zhongli Chun when there were important matters and would play with Xia Yingchun when he was free. This gave rise to the idiom 有事鍾無艷，無事夏迎春.

Sons:

- Prince Di (公子地; 323–284 BC), ruled as King Min of Qi from 300–284 BC
- Youngest son, Prince Tong (公子通), the progenitor of the Yan (焉) lineage
  - Granted the fiefdom of Lu (陆)

King Xuan of Qi House of Tian Died: 301 BC
Regnal titles
| Preceded by King Wei of Qi | King of Qi; 319–301 BC | Succeeded by King Min of Qi |
