= Duke Tai of Tian Qi =

Ruler of the Chinese state of Qi from 386 to 384 BC

Duke Tai of Tian Qi 田齊太公

Duke of Qi
- Reign: 386–384 BC
- Predecessor: Duke Kang of Jiang Qi
- Successor: Tian Yan
- Died: 384 BC
- Spouse: Consort Xiao (孝大妃)
- Issue: Tian Yan; Duke Huan of Tian Qi
Names
- Ancestral name: Guī (媯); Clan name: Tián (田); Given name: Hé (和)
Posthumous name
- Duke Tai (太公)
- House: Gui
- Dynasty: Tian Qi
- Father: Viscount Zhuang of Tian (田莊子)

Duke Tai of Tian Qi (Chinese: 田齊太公; pinyin: Tián Qí Tài Gōng), personal name Tian He, was the first ruler of the Tian Qi state from 386 BC until his death in 384 BC.

He was the first monarch of Qi from the Tian clan, which replaced the Jiang clan that had ruled the state for over six centuries.

== Reign ==
Since Tian He's great-grandfather Tian Heng killed Duke Jian of Qi in 481 BC, the leaders of the Tian clan had been the de facto rulers of Qi. In 404 BC Tian He succeeded his older brother Tian Daozi as head of the Tian clan. He nominally served under Duke Kang of Qi, the last ruler from the House of Jiang, but effectively ruled the state himself.

Tian He asked Marquis Wu of Wei to lobby for him at the court of King An of Zhou, the nominal ruler of all China. In 386 BC, King An officially recognized Tian He as ruler of Qi, ending more than six centuries of rule by the House of Jiang. Tian He became the first de jure ruler of Qi from the House of Tian, and is posthumously known as Duke Tai of Qi. He subsequently exiled Duke Kang to a seaside city, where Duke Kang lived for seven more years and died in 379 BC.

Duke Tai died in 384 BC, just two years after formally ascending the throne. He was succeeded by his son Tian Yan, who would later be killed by Duke Tai's younger son Tian Wu, Duke Huan of Tian Qi.

== Mausoleum ==
Duke Tai's mausoleum is located near the village of Chengjiagou (程家沟) in Putong Township (普通乡) of Qingzhou, Shandong Province. The extant structure measures 190 metres (620 ft) from east to west, 84 metres (276 ft) from north to south, and 30 metres (98 ft) high. The seven known mausoleums of Tian Qi rulers are now protected as a National Historical and Cultural Site. Since 2008 they have been included in the tentative list of UNESCO World Heritage Sites as part of the ancient Qi capital and mausoleum complex.

== Family ==
Ancestor:

- Duke Li of Chen, personal name Gui Yue, a duke of the Chen state.
- Gui Wan (媯完), son of Gui Yue, he later fled to the Jiang Qi state in 672 BC and changed Clan name to Tian.

Wives:

- Lady (d. 364 BC), the mother of Prince Yan

Concubines:

- Consort Xiao (孝妃), the mother of Prince Wu

Sons:

- Prince Yan (公子剡; d. 375 BC), ruled as the Duke of Qi from 383 to 375 BC
- Prince Wu (公子午; 400–357 BC), ruled as Duke Huan of Tian Qi from 374 to 357 BC

== Bibliography ==
- Han, Zhaoqi, ed. (2010). "Houses of Chen and Qi". Shiji 史记 (in Chinese). Beijing: Zhonghua Book Company. ISBN 978-7-101-07272-3.

Duke Tai of Tian Qi House of Tian Died: 384 BC
Regnal titles
Preceded by Duke Kang of Qi	Duke of Qi; 386–384 BC	Succeeded by Yan, Duke of Qi
Chinese nobility
Preceded by Tian Daozi	Head of the House of Tian; 404–386 BC	Merged in the Crown
