= Duke Jing of Qi =

Ruler of the Chinese state of Qi from 547 to 490 BC

Duke Jing of Qi 齊景公

Duke of Qi
- Reign: 547–490 BC
- Predecessor: Duke Zhuang II
- Successor: Lü Tu
- Died: 490 BC
- Spouse: Yan Ji (燕姬)
- Issue: Duke Dao; Lü Tu
Names
- Ancestral name: Jiāng (姜); Clan name: Lǚ (呂); Given name: Chǔjiù (杵臼)
Posthumous name
- Duke Jing (景公)
- House: Jiang
- Dynasty: Jiang Qi
- Father: Duke Ling
- Mother: Mu Meng Ji (穆孟姬)

Duke Jing of Qi (Chinese: 齊景公; pinyin: Qí Jǐng Gōng), personal name Lü Chujiu, was the 26th ruler of the Jiang Qi state from 547 BC until his death in 490 BC.

After years of unrest as two powerful ministers, Cui Zhu (崔杼) and Qing Feng (慶封), sought to control the Qi state, Duke Jing appointed Yan Ying as his prime minister, and Qi entered a period of relative peace and prosperity.

== Accession to the throne ==
Duke Jing was born to a concubine of Duke Ling of Qi. His mother was a daughter of Shusun Xuanbo, head of one of the Three Huan clans that dominated the control of power in the neighbouring State of Lu. When his father died in 554 BC, his older half-brother Duke Zhuang succeeded Duke Ling and killed Crown Prince Ya with the support of the powerful minister Cui Zhu (崔杼). However, Duke Zhuang had an adulterous relationship with Cui's wife, and was killed by Cui in 548 BC.

The day after killing Duke Zhuang, Cui Zhu installed Duke Jing on the throne. Cui and Qing Feng (慶封), another powerful nobleman, were Duke Jing's co-prime ministers and controlled the state.

== The Cui–Qing Unrest ==
In 546 BC, the second year of Duke Jing's reign, the sons of Cui Zhu's two wives fought each other for the right to succeed their father as leader of the clan. The two sons of Cui's deceased first wife killed the son of Cui's second wife, Tang Jiang, from her previous marriage. Cui sought help from Qing Feng, who took the opportunity to kill Cui's sons and exterminate the Cui clan. Cui Zhu and his wife both committed suicide. As a result, Qing Feng gained full control of Qi.

Qing Feng's power did not last long. Just a year later, Qing Feng had a dispute with his son Qing She. Taking advantage of the discord within the Qing clan, four other aristocratic clans of Qi: Tian, Bao, Gao, and Luan, jointly attacked the Qing clan. Qing Feng fled to the State of Lu, which soon expelled him for fear of offending Qi, and Qing settled in the State of Wu.

After the Cui–Qing unrest, Duke Jing appointed Yan Ying as his prime minister, and the State of Qi entered a period of relative peace and prosperity. Yan Ying died in 500 BC, the 48th year of Duke Jing's reign, and is remembered as one of the greatest statesmen and diplomats of the Spring and Autumn period.

== Succession ==
Duke Jing's main wife was Yan Ji, a princess of the State of Yan, whose son was the crown prince of Qi. Duke Jing also had a favoured concubine named Yu Si, who was from the minor state of Chunyu.

The crown prince, however, died just before Duke Jing in the summer of 490 BC. Although Duke Jing had at least five other adult sons, he decided to make Prince Tu, his youngest son by Yu Si, the new crown prince. Because Prince Tu was a young boy and his mother was of a lowly status, Duke Jing ordered the ministers Guo Xia of the Guo clan and Gao Zhang of the Gao clan to support Prince Tu and exile the other princes to the remote city of Lai.

Duke Jing died soon afterward in the autumn of 490 BC. Guo and Gao installed Prince Tu on the throne, and the other princes escaped to the nearby states of Wey and Lu. However, the next year, the Tian and Bao clans led by Tian Qi and Bao Mu revolted and defeated the Gao and Guo clans. Tian Qi brought back Prince Yangsheng from Lu and installed him on the throne, to be known as Duke Dao of Qi. Duke Dao soon killed his younger half-brother Prince Tu, who is posthumously known as An Ruzi.

== Tomb ==
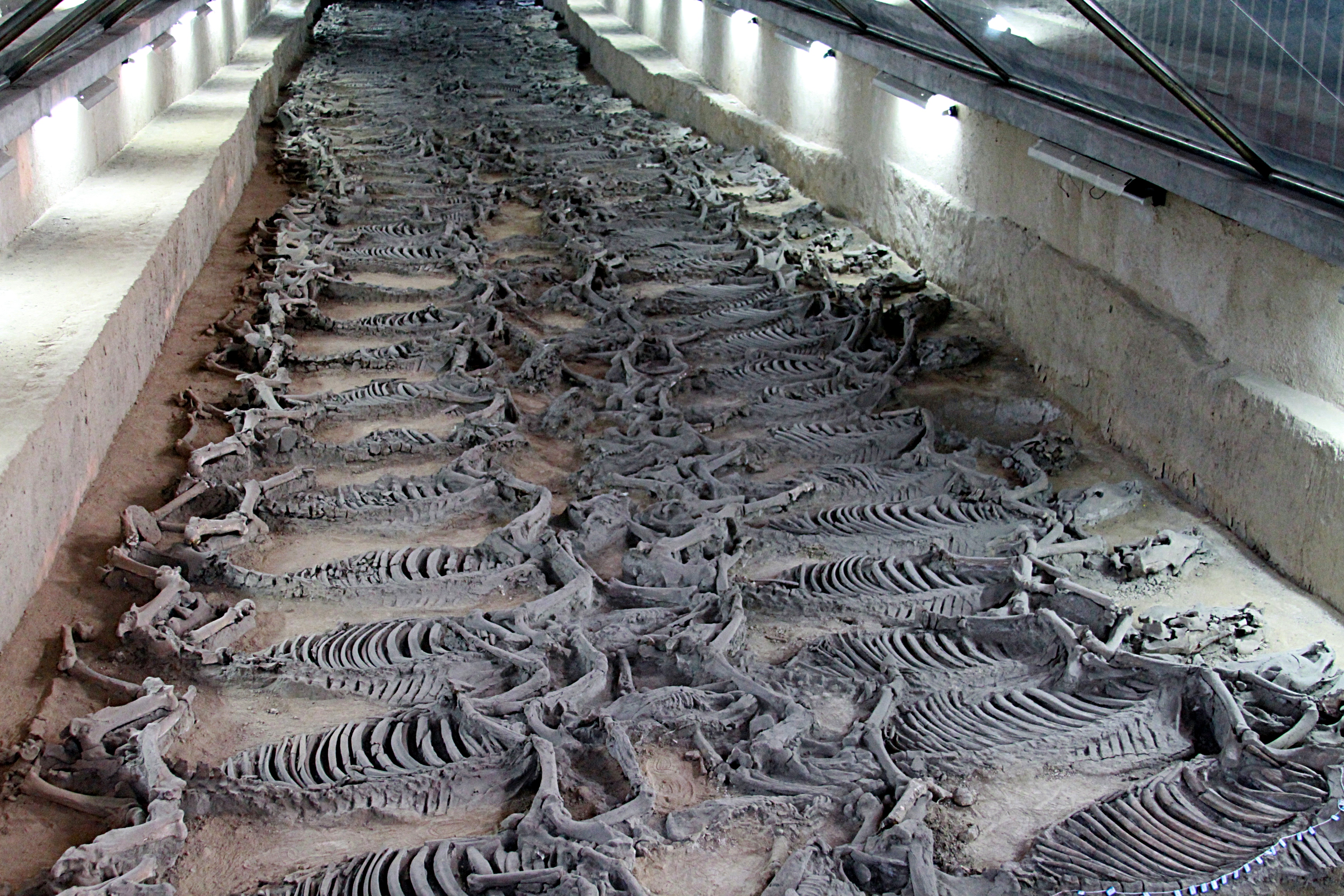
Sacrificial horses discovered in the tomb of Duke Jing of Qi

The tomb of Duke Jing of Qi (36°53′8.78″N 118°22′11.10″E) has been discovered in the village of Yatou (崖头) in Linzi District of Zibo, Shandong Province, north-east of the site of the ancient Qi capital Linzi. In 1964, archaeologists made a striking discovery of a large site of sacrificial horses buried on the northern side of the tomb. 145 horse skeletons were found.

The pit for the sacrificial horses is 215 metres (705 ft) long, wrapping around the tomb on three sides. In 1982, archaeologists excavated a further 36.5 metres (120 ft) of the pit and unearthed 106 more horse skeletons. The tomb has not been completely excavated, but archaeologists estimate that more than 600 horses were buried in total, making it by far the largest horse sacrifice site discovered in China. The horses were between the ages of five and seven when they died. It is believed that they were killed by strikes on the head after being fed alcohol and falling unconscious. Also found in the tomb are 30 sacrificial dogs, two pigs, and six other domesticated animals.

The tomb is now protected as a National Historical and Cultural Site and a museum has been built on the site. Since 2008 it has been included in the tentative list of UNESCO World Heritage Sites as part of the ancient Qi capital and mausoleum complex.

== Family ==
Wives:

- Yan Ji, of the Ji clan of Yan (燕姬 姬姓), possibly a daughter of Duke Hui of Yan; married in 536 BC; the mother of a son who died young

Concubines:

- Yu Si, of the Si clan of Chunyu (鬻姒 姒姓), the mother of Crown Prince Tu
- Hu Ji, of the Ji clan (胡姬 姬姓; d. 487 BC)

Sons:

- A son who died young
- Prince Jia (公子嘉), fled to Wey in 490 BC
- Prince Ju (公子駒), fled to Wey in 490 BC
- Prince Qian (公子黔), fled to Wey in 490 BC
- Prince Chu (公子鉏), fled to Lu in 490 BC
- Prince Yangsheng (公子陽生; d. 485 BC), ruled as Duke Dao of Qi from 488 to 485 BC
- Youngest son, Crown Prince Tu (太子荼; d. 489 BC); ruled as the Duke of Qi in 489 BC
  - Known as An Ruzi

Duke Jing of Qi House of Jiang Died: 490 BC
Regnal titles
Preceded by Duke Zhuang II of Qi	Duke of Qi; 547–490 BC	Succeeded by An Ruzi
