= Duke Jian of Qi =

Ruler of Qi from 484 to 481 BC

Duke Jian of Qi 齊簡公

Duke of Qi
- Reign: 484–481 BC
- Predecessor: Duke Dao
- Successor: Duke Ping
- Died: 481 BC
Names
- Ancestral name: Jiāng (姜); Clan name: Lǚ (呂); Given name: Rén (壬)
Posthumous name
- Duke Jian (簡公)
- House: Jiang
- Dynasty: Jiang Qi
- Father: Duke Dao

Duke Jian of Qi (Chinese: 齊簡公; pinyin: Qí Jiǎn Gōng), personal name Lü Ren, was the 29th ruler of the Jiang Qi state from 484 BC until his death in 481 BC.

== Reign ==
Duke Jian succeeded his father, Duke Dao of Qi, who was killed in 485 BC after four years of reign. Duke Jian made his trusted official Kan Zhi (闞止), a native of the neighbouring State of Lu, his prime minister. In 481 BC Kan Zhi plotted to attack and expel the powerful Tian clan from Qi, but the Tians learned of his plan and staged a preemptive coup d'etat. Kan Zhi was killed first, and Duke Jian escaped the capital but was captured in Shuzhou (in present-day Teng County, Shandong) and killed on the 24th day of the fifth month.

Tian Heng, the leader of the Tian clan, subsequently installed Duke Jian's younger brother Ao on the throne, to be known as Duke Ping of Qi. From then on the dukes of Qi would be reduced to mere figureheads and the leaders of the Tian clan would be de facto rulers of Qi, and in 386 BC Tian He would formally become Duke of Qi, ending more than six centuries of rule by the House of Jiang.

Duke Jian of Qi House of Jiang Died: 481 BC
Regnal titles
Preceded by Duke Dao of Qi	Duke of Qi; 484–481 BC	Succeeded by Duke Ping of Qi
