= Wei Wang =

Wei Wang may refer to:

== Chinese royalty ==
In Chinese history, Wei Wang (King/Prince of Wei, or King/Prince Wei) may refer to:

=== Warring States period ===
- King Wei of Qi (died 320 BC)
- King Wei of Chu (died 329 BC)
- Monarchs of Wei (state)
  - King Hui of Wei (r. 370–319 BC)
  - King Xiang of Wei (r. 319–296 BC)
  - King Zhao of Wei (r. 296–277 BC)
  - King Anxi of Wei (r. 277–243 BC)
  - King Jingmin of Wei (r. 243–228 BC)

=== Han dynasty ===
- Cao Cao (155–220), late Han dynasty warlord, known as King/Prince of Wei (魏王) from 216 to 220
- Cao Pi (187–226), briefly known as King/Prince of Wei (魏王) before he usurped the Han throne

=== Tang dynasty ===
- Li Tai (618–652), known as Prince of Wei (衛王) from 621 to 628 and Prince of Wei (魏王) from 636 to 643
- Wu Chengsi (died 698), Wu Zetian's nephew, known as Prince of Wei (魏王) after 690
- Li Chongjun (died 707), known as Prince of Wei (衛王) after 705
- Han Jian (Weibo warlord) (died 883), known as Prince of Wei Commandery (魏郡王)
- Zhu Wen (852–912), known as Prince of Wei (魏王) from 905 to 907 before he usurped the Tang throne

=== Others ===
- Li Jiji (died 926), Later Tang prince, known as Prince of Wei (魏王) after 925
- Liu Chang (Southern Han) (942–980), Southern Han emperor, known as Prince of Wei (衛王) before he became the emperor in 958
- Wanyan Yongji (died 1213), Jin dynasty emperor, known as Prince of Wei (衛王) after 1197 and before he became the emperor in 1208
- Zhao Bing (1272–1279), Song dynasty emperor, known as Prince of Wei (衛王) after 1276 and before he became the emperor in 1278

== Other people ==
- Wei Wang (table tennis) (born 1961), Chinese-American Olympic table tennis player
- Wei Wang (computer scientist), professor at UCLA

== See also ==
- Wei (disambiguation)
- Wang Wei (disambiguation)
