= Four Lords of the Warring States =

Aristocrats of the late Warring States period

- Traditional Chinese: 戰國四公子
- Simplified Chinese: 战国四公子
- Literal meaning: "The Four Young Lords of the Warring States"
Transcriptions
Standard Mandarin
- Hanyu Pinyin: Zhànguó sì gōngzǐ

The Four Lords of the Warring States were four powerful aristocrats of the late Warring States period of Chinese history who exerted a strong influence on the politics of their respective states in the third century BCE.

During this time, the Zhou king was a mere figurehead, and seven states led by aristocratic families competed for real power. Although they were not themselves monarchs, four aristocrats stood out because of their tremendous military power and wealth: Lord Mengchang (d. 279 BCE) of Qi, Lord Pingyuan (d. 251 BCE) of Zhao, Lord Xinling (d. 243 BCE) of Wei and Lord Chunshen (d. 238 BCE) of Chu.

All four were renowned for their activity in the politics of their era as well as being the persona of their state respectively at the time; they also wielded influence via the cultivation and housing of many talented house-guests, who often included learned men and tacticians. As such, they came to be the most prominent patrons of the shi (士) or scholar-knights, stimulating the intellectual life of the time. Their prestige became the inspiration for Lü Buwei when he created his academic analogue in Qin.

== References in the Records of the Grand Historian ==
These four lords are paralleled in some books of the Records of the Grand Historian, the first of the Twenty-Four Histories of China.

In the Biographies of Lord Pingyuan and Yu Qing,

At this time, [in addition to Lord Pingyuan in Zhao,] in Qi lived Mengchang, in Wei Xinling, and in Chu Chunshen. They competed to invite shi (talents).

In the Biography of Lord Chunshen,

Lord Chunshen now stood as the prime minister of the Kingdom of Chu. At this time, in Qi lived Lord Mengchang, in Zhao Lord Pingyuan, and in Wei Lord Xinling. They competed to humble themselves before shi (talents) [to hire them], invited brilliant guests, and tried to defeat each other. They sustained their states and held the real power.

== Lord Mengchang ==
Lord Mengchang was an aristocrat of the State of Qi. He was born Tian Wen, son of Tian Ying and the grandson of King Wei of Qi. He succeeded his father's fief in Xue.

== Lord Pingyuan ==
Born Zhao Sheng, he was a son of King Wuling of Zhao, brother of King Huiwen and uncle to King Xiaocheng. During his life, he was thrice appointed the Prime Minister of the State of Zhao.

Zhao Sheng's fief was the City of Dongwu. Lord Pingyuan was his title, and some of his famous retainers included the philosophers Xun Kuang and Gongsun Long, the Yin and Yang master Zou Yan, and the diplomat Mao Sui.

== Lord Xinling ==
Born as Wei Wuji, he was the son of King Zhao of the State of Wei and younger half-brother to King Anxi of Wei. In 277 BCE, King Anxi assigned Wei Wuji the fief of Xinling.

At the height of his career, he was the supreme commander of the armed forces of the Kingdom of Wei. After stepping down, Lord Xinling became dispirited and died in 243 BCE.

== Lord Chunshen ==
Born Huang Xie, he was originally a government official working for King Qingxiang of Chu, and later followed Crown Prince Wan when he spent ten years as a hostage in the Kingdom of Qin.

After the death of King Qingxiang, Prince Wan and Huang Xie returned to the Kingdom of Chu. Prince Wan was enthroned as King Kaolie of Chu, while Huang Xie was appointed prime minister and received the title of Lord Chunshen. For the next 25 years, Lord Chunshen remained Prime Minister of Chu, until his assassination by Li Yuan in 238 BCE.

== See also ==
- Five Hegemons
