= Lord Chunshen =

Prime Minister of Chinese state of Chu (died 238 BC)

Huang Xie
- 黃歇
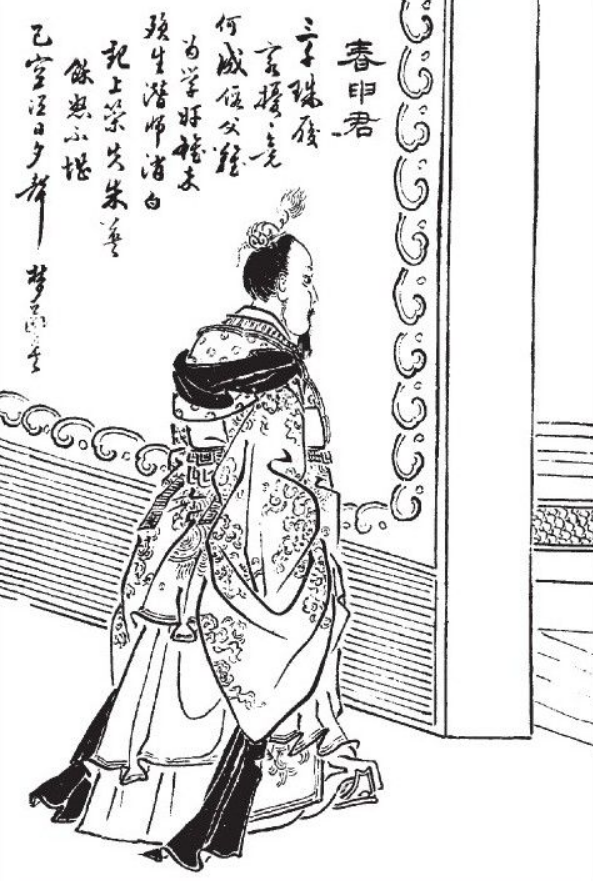
- Born: Unknown
- Died: 238 BC
- Monuments: Lord Chunshen Temple, Shanghai
- Occupations: Military general, politician
- Known for: Prime Minister of Chu, one of the Four Lords of the Warring States
- Title: Lord Chunshen

Lord Chunshen (Chinese: 春申君; pinyin: Chūnshēn Jūn; Wade–Giles: Ch'un-shen Chün; died 238 BC), born Huang Xie (Chinese: 黃歇; Wade–Giles: Huang Hsieh), was a Chinese military general and politician. He served as the Prime Minister of the Chu state during the late Warring States period of ancient China. He was one of the Four Lords of the Warring States. (Note: The other three were Lord Mengchang, Lord Pingyuan and Lord Xinling.)

Lord Chunshen is a revered figure in his former fief, especially in Shanghai, which is often called Shencheng (申城), or City of Shen, in his honour. In 2002, Shanghai rebuilt the Temple of Lord Chunshen at the Chunshen Village in Songjiang District.

== Family background ==
Much of what is known about Lord Chunshen comes from his biography in the Records of the Grand Historian (Shiji), written by the Han Dynasty historian Sima Qian. The Shiji does not mention his family background, leading some historians to speculate that he descended from the State of Huang, judging by his surname. However, most modern historians, including Ch'ien Mu and Yang Kuan, believe that he was a son of King Huai of Chu, and younger brother of King Qingxiang of Chu.

== As ambassador to Qin ==
As Huang Xie was a well-educated scholar and highly eloquent in his speech, King Qingxiang of Chu dispatched him as an ambassador to the Kingdom of Qin. At this time the Kingdom of Chu, though large in area, was in grave danger from Qin, the most powerful of the Seven Warring States. King Huai, King Qingxiang's father, had died in captivity in Qin, and a Qin army had invaded the western part of Chu and captured its capital Ying. King Qingxiang had been forced to flee and move his capital east to Chen County.

The historical text Zhan Guo Ce records a long, impassioned letter written by an unnamed Chu envoy to the king of Qin, pleading him not to invade Chu. In the Shiji, Sima Qian attributes this letter to Huang Xie, saying that he successfully persuaded King Zhao of Qin to call off his plan to invade Chu. However, modern historians have concluded the letter could not have been written by Huang, as it mentioned events that occurred after his death.

== Rescue of the crown prince ==
As part of a peace treaty with Qin, King Qingxiang of Chu agreed to send his son, Crown Prince Wan, to Qin as a hostage, and Huang Xie stayed with the prince in Qin. After several years, Huang Xie received the news that King Qingxiang was ill. Afraid that the son of Lord Yangwen, King Qingxiang's brother, would seize the throne if Crown Prince Wan remained a hostage in Qin, Huang Xie secretly arranged the prince's escape back to Chu.

When Huang Xie told King Zhao of Qin about Prince Wan's escape, the furious king ordered him to commit suicide. However, Fan Ju, the Prime Minister of Qin, persuaded King Zhao to release Huang Xie, in order to maintain a friendly relationship with Chu.

== As Prime Minister of Chu ==
Three months after Huang Xie returned to Chu, King Qingxiang died in 263 BC. Crown Prince Wan ascended the throne, to be known as King Kaolie of Chu. In 262 BC, King Kaolie appointed Huang Xie the Prime Minister of Chu, awarded him the title Lord Chunshen, and enfeoffed him with twelve counties of Huaibei, north of the Huai River. Fifteen years later, at Lord Chunshen's own request, the king changed his fief to the Jiangnan area (then called Jiangdong), because it was better for the state to directly administer the strategic Huaibei area, at the border with Qi. Lord Chunshen set up his new base at the former capital of Wu, in modern Suzhou.

Lord Chunshen became powerful and wealthy, and kept more than 3,000 retainers. He became well known as one of the Four Lords of the Warring States, together with Lord Mengchang of Qi, Lord Xinling of Wei, and Lord Pingyuan of Zhao.

In 259 BC, the Qin army massacred 400,000 Zhao soldiers at the Battle of Changping, and besieged Handan, the capital of Zhao, the following year. Zhao sought help from Chu; Lord Chunshen led the Chu army to Handan, and successfully relieved the siege. In 256 BC, Lord Chunshen attacked the State of Lu, and annexed the state for Chu.

In 241 BC, five of the seven major warring states: Chu, Zhao, Wei, Yan, and Han, formed an alliance to fight the rising power of Qin. King Kaolie of Chu was named the leader of the alliance, and Lord Chunshen the military commander. According to historian Yang Kuan, the Zhao general Pang Nuan (庞煖) was the actual commander in the battle. The allies attacked Qin at the strategic Hangu Pass, but were defeated. King Kaolie blamed Lord Chunshen for the loss and began to mistrust him. Afterwards, Chu moved its capital east to Shouchun, farther away from the threat of Qin.

== Assassination ==
In 238 BC, King Kaolie was ill. Earlier, Lord Chunshen's retainer Li Yuan (李園) presented his younger sister to the king. The sister gave birth to a son, who was made the crown prince of Chu, and she became the queen. Li Yuan also gained the favour of the king. When the king was dying, Zhu Ying (朱英), another of Lord Chunshen's 3,000 retainers, advised him to kill Li Yuan, but Lord Chunshen refused, believing that Li Yuan was a weak man and grateful to him.

As soon as King Kaolie died in 238 BC, Li Yuan dispatched killers to assassinate Lord Chunshen as he entered the Ji Gate (棘门) in Shouchun. After killing him, Li Yuan ordered the massacre of Lord Chunshen's entire family. Li Yuan's nephew, the crown prince, ascended the throne, to be known as King You of Chu.

== Relationship with King You ==
According to the Zhan Guo Ce, King You of Chu was the illegitimate son of Lord Chunshen. It is said that King Kaolie had no son despite having many concubines. Li Yuan presented his younger sister to Lord Chunshen, and after she became pregnant with Lord Chunshen's child but before the pregnancy was obvious, Lord Chunshen presented the woman to the king. She gave birth to a boy named Xiong Han, who was made the crown prince and later became King You of Chu.

Sima Qian recorded the story in the Shiji as part of Lord Chunshen's biography, but most historians, including Huang Shisan, Ch'ien Mu, and Yang Kuan, consider it apocryphal. King Kaolie was known to have at least three other sons, King Ai, Fuchu, and Lord Changping, the last three kings of Chu.

== Legacy ==
Lord Chunshen is a revered figure in his former fief of Wu, and especially in Shanghai. He was credited with building hydrological works on the "three rivers" of Wu: East River, Lou River, and Wusong River, which helped to prevent floods and develop agriculture. The Huangpu, Shanghai's "mother river", gets its name from Lord Chunshen's surname Huang. The Huangpu is also called the Chunshen or Shen River.

Shanghai is also called Shencheng, or City of Shen, in the honour of Lord Chunshen. In 2002, the Shanghai government rebuilt the Temple of Lord Chunshen on the site of an ancient temple. The temple is in the Chunshen Village, where he was said to have lived, in Songjiang District. The temple is decorated with calligraphy by famous Songjiang artists Shi Zhecun, Cheng Shifa, and Zheng Wei (郑为).

Lord Chunshen's tomb is said to be located in Huainan, Anhui province, 12 kilometers outside of ancient Shouchun. The extant tomb measures 90 meters by 80 meters, and is 11 meters high.

Jiangxia District of Wuhan, Hubei province claims that Lord Chunshen was buried in Jiangxia after his death, and has built a tomb and sculpture for him.

== Portrayal in media ==
In the manga Kingdom, he is portrayed as a caustic man.

In the novel The Legend of Mi Yue and its TV series adaptation, due to his obscure background, Huang Xie is written to be a childhood friend and first love of the eponymous protagonist Mi Yue.
