= Retainers in early China =

Social group in early China

Retainers, also known as house guests (門客; 门客; ménkè; men-k'o), invited guests (traditional Chinese: 賓客; simplified Chinese: 宾客; pinyin: bīnkè; Wade–Giles: pin-k'o) or catered guests (Chinese: 食客; pinyin: shíkè; Wade–Giles: shih-k'o), were a special social group in Ancient China from pre-Qin period to Han dynasty, who lived as dependent employees under a nobleman, an officeholder, or a powerful landlord.

Retainers typically stayed long-term at the residence of the employer, catered and provisioned by the host, and also obtained through him other benefits such as administrative power, reputation, upward mobility and social status. In return, a retainer would serve and provide personal services to his host, usually as advisors, clerks and bodyguards, but sometimes as dedicated lieutenants or mercenaries for more dangerous tasks such as espionage, assassination and warfare. Although the bond is one of social contract, a retainer was often free to come and go outside of duty without needing permission, and he could leave the service without noticing if he felt mistreated or disapproved of the behavior of his host.

== The historical development ==
The practice of elites keeping retainers as private aids can be traced back at least to the Warring States period (ca. 476-221 BCE). Ancient Chinese social structure was changing during this time, the system of feudal states created by the Western Zhou dynasty underwent enormous changes after 771 BCE with the flight of the Zhou court to Chengzhou (modern-day Luoyang) and the diminution of the court's relevance and power. The sovereign (king of Zhou) was merely a figurehead and the social hierarchy which formerly had depended on blood-relationship to the king of the Zhou was severely impacted by the move. The Spring and Autumn period led to a few states gaining power at the expense of many others, the latter no longer able to depend on central authority for legitimacy or protection. During the Warring States period, many rulers claimed the Mandate of Heaven to justify their conquest of other states and spread their influence. The number of retainers one was able to invest seems to have been a status symbol, and keeping retainers also served as a means to augment political power. A retainer could with his own ability and efforts acquire benefits and improve his social status. Therefore, there many noblemen kept retainers, and some of them, up to about three thousand retainers.

This pre-Qin practice of keeping retainers was continued in Qin times (BCE 221–207). Li Si 李斯 (BCE 280–208), the imperial chancellor, and Zhao Gao 赵高, the powerful eunuch, each kept a number of retainers.

Having retainers was still very popular in Han times, the largest number of retainers reported for the Han was ca. one thousand. Under the protection of a powerful master a retainer usually was able to avoid the payment of taxes. Furthermore, the government had difficulty in levying labor and military service from the retainers of powerful person. Under the protection of a master some guests engaged I robbery, murder, and other unlawful activities. It seems that there developed a sort of patron-client relationship. The host became more demanding and arrogant, while the retainers became more subservient.

The number of retainers kept by a host again increased in the era of the Three Kingdoms (220-280 CE). There were two instances of men who kept more than a thousand retainers. This sudden increase is understandable: during the wars and disturbed periods of the Later Han and thereafter, every powerful person was ambitious to use his strength to acquire political power and tended to keep a large number of retainers who actually were his personal troops. From the end of the Early Han the retainers began to participate in production, particularly in the cultivation of land. This tendency was more dominant at the end of the Later Han and in the years of the Three Kingdoms. For example, a provincial governor sent ten of his retainers to build a house and plant orange trees. The family derived a profit worth several thousand rolls of silk from the produce yearly and became wealthy. They actually became tenants, who paid labor and earned remunerations.

== The role of the host ==
The host was expected to provide lodging, food, clothing and even carriages for his retainers and to treat them generously. Some of the most honored retainers were even given luxurious articles such as pearls and jade. Obviously only the wealthy nobles and officials could afford to support a large number of retainers. Prince Tian Wen 田文 (?-279 BCE) of Qi (state)齐, Prince Zhao Sheng 趙勝 (?- 251 BCE) of Zhao (state) 趙, Prince Wei Wuji 魏無忌 (?-243 BCE) of Wei, and Chancellor Huang Xie 黄歇 (?-238 BCE) of the State of Chu (state), all tried to have more and more retainers. A prince with such an enormous number of retainers under his command usually was powerful enough to control his own state. Sometimes a state did not even dare to fight with a neighboring state because the ruler had thousands of retainers. While the number of retainers kept by a master could be enormous, they must have varied greatly in personality and qualification; and of course their selection depended heavily on the attitudes and disposition of the patron.

== The social status of retainers ==
In the pre-Qin time, the social status of a retainer was not an inferior one. A master, though much superior in political and social status as well as in wealth, had to treat his retainers politely. But guests did not all have the same status, nor were they all treated the same. As a rule, those who engaged in humble occupation and were looked down upon by society were also held in less respect as retainers. A man without special ability was also considered inferior by his master and his fellow retainers. The status of retainers in the Later Han, and especially in the era of the Three Kingdoms, was markedly inferior; retainers were asked to engage in productive and menial labor and were treated more like slaves or servants.

== The function of retainers ==
In pre-Qin times, the retainer seldom had definite obligations, and usually no routine work was assigned to him. He was expected to render occasional service according to his abilities when there was such a demand. When Prince Tian Wen 田文 wanted to send someone to collect his debts, he inquired of his retainers whether one of them was versed in accounting and competent for his job. Sometimes the mission was difficult or even dangerous. A retainer was expected to do what the master asked of him and even risk his life for him. Hundreds of retainers were ready to give up their lives to follow Prince Wei Wuji 魏無忌.

In Han times, retainers served in various capacities. They were intelligent men who served as personal advisors to high officials. Others were engaged in physical and menial work. Some retainers served as bodyguards. It was not uncommon to ask a retainer to assassinate an enemy. Under unusual conditions retainers were even asked to engage in robbery and other unlawful activities. As a rule, retainers were expected to share the suffering of their master and offer help in times of emergency or danger. Retainers also had obligations to defend the family of their master when it was attacked by bandits or enemies. The military services of retainers obviously were a help in seeking military and political power.

Retainers were usually not asked to perform domestic or productive work in the pre-Qin through early Han periods, but from the end of the early Han the retainers participated in production, particularly in the cultivation of land, and this tendency was more dominant at the end of Later Han and Three Kingdoms (220-280 CE) periods. During this time, retainers were treated in the same manner as slaves, and slaves and retainers were expected to perform the same kind of menial work.

== Famous retainers in history ==
Sun Bin 孫臏, the famous retainer in the residence of Tian Ji 田忌 in the Warring States period. Once, King Wei of Qi invited Tian Ji to a horse racing competition. Sun Bin suggested a strategy to Tian Ji to utilize his horses to the best advantage, and Tian won two out of three rounds in the race. The king was impressed with Tian's victory. Tian admitted that he won with the help of Sun Bin, and recommended Sun's talents to the king. King Wei wanted to appoint Sun Bin as the commander of the Qi armies. Sun declined, as his handicap prevented him from riding horseback, and would have a negative effect on the morale of soldiers. Sun was then appointed chief military advisor instead and served as Tian Ji's deputy.

== Literature ==
- Editorial Committee of Encyclopedia of China中国大百科全书编委会(1986): Zhongguo Dabaike Quanshu中国大百科全书Encyclopedia of China. Vol. History. Beijing and Shanghai: Zhongguo Dabaike Quanshu Chubanshe 中国大百科全书出版社. p. 50.
- Ch'ü T'ung-tsu (1972): Han Social Structure. Seattle: University of Washington Press. pp. 127–145.
- Scott Cook (2010): "'San De' and Warring States Views on Heavenly Retribution." Journal of Chinese Philosophy, no.37 (2010), pp. 101–123.
- Bao Jiashu 鲍家树 (2010): "Xian Qin 'menke' jiqi jingshen jizhi tanjiu" 先秦"门客"及其精神基质研究 [A Study of Retainers in the Pre-Qin Period and Their Spiritual Basis]. Journal of Hainan Normal University 海南师范大学报. No.5 2010. pp. 139.-144. .
- Shiji 史記 [Records of the Court Archivist] (by Sima Qian 司馬遷 [ca. 145-86 BCE] et al.), Baina edition, 1931.
- Sanguo Zhi三國志 [Records of the Three Kingdom] (by Chen Shou 陳壽 [ca. 233-297 BCE] et al.), Baina edition. 1931.
- Hanshu漢書 (by Ban Gu 班固 [32-92 BCE] et al.), Baina edition, 1931.
- Hou Hanshu 後漢書 (by Fan Ye范曄 [ca. 398-445 BCE] et al.), Baina edition, 1931.

== See also ==
- Four Lords of the Warring States
- Feudalism in China
- Mufu
- Spring and Autumn period
- Warring States period
