= Wei Bao =

King of Western Wei
- Reign: 206–205 BC
- Died: 204 BC
- Father: King Jingmin of Wei

Wei Bao
- Chinese: 魏豹
Transcriptions
Standard Mandarin
- Hanyu Pinyin: Wèi Bào

Wei Bao (died 204 BC) was the ruler of the Kingdom of Western Wei (西魏國) of the Eighteen Kingdoms during the Chu–Han Contention, an interregnum between the Qin and Han dynasties of China.

== Life ==
Wei Bao was a descendant of the royal family of the Wei state of the Seven Warring States. His father was King Jingmin, the second to last ruler of Wei, and his older brother, Wei Jia, was the last king of Wei. The Wei state was conquered by the Qin state in 225 BC as part of a series of wars to unify China under Qin rule.

Wei Bao and other former Wei royals lived as commoners under the Qin dynasty until 209 BC, when uprisings broke out throughout China to overthrow the Qin Empire. Around this time, Wei Jiu (魏咎), another brother of Wei Bao, joined a rebel force led by Chen Sheng and Wu Guang. They managed to seize control of former Wei territories from Qin forces, and Wei Jiu was declared king of a restored Wei state. However, in the following year, Qin forces under Zhang Han defeated the Wei forces in battle. As part of an agreement with Qin forces not to harm his people, Wei Jiu committed suicide by setting himself on fire.

Wei Bao escaped to the insurgent Chu state, where he received military support from Chu forces and managed to recapture the Wei territories. King Huai II of Chu recognised Wei Bao as the new king of Wei. Wei Bao joined the Chu general Xiang Yu in attacking Qin-controlled territories as they advanced towards the Qin heartland in the Guanzhong region.

After the fall of the Qin Empire in 206 BC, Xiang Yu declared himself Hegemon-King of Western Chu (西楚霸王) and divided the former Qin territories into the Eighteen Kingdoms. He made Wei Bao the King of Western Wei (西魏王), with the Wei capital at Pingyang (平陽; around present-day Linfen, Shanxi).

Around the time, a power struggle broke out between Xiang Yu and Liu Bang, the King of Han, for control over the lands of the former Qin Empire. In 205 BC, when the Han army invaded Western Wei, Wei Bao surrendered to Liu Bang and joined him in attacking Xiang Yu.

However, after Xiang Yu defeated Liu Bang at the Battle of Pengcheng later that year, Wei Bao lied to Liu Bang that he wanted to visit a sick relative and seized the opportunity to betray Liu Bang and return to Western Wei. Liu Bang sent Li Yiji to persuade Wei Bao to surrender, but Wei Bao refused, saying that Liu Bang was arrogant and disrespectful. Liu Bang then sent Han Xin and Cao Shen to lead his forces to attack Wei Bao. Han Xin tricked Wei Bao and launched a surprise attack on Anyi (安邑; present-day Xia County, Shanxi), where he defeated and captured Wei Bao in battle. The Western Wei territories were then absorbed into the Han Empire as its Hedong Commandery.

In 204 BC, during the Battle of Xingyang, Liu Bang left Wei Bao to defend Xingyang. When Xiang Yu's forces besieged and attacked the city, Zhou Ke (周苛), another of Liu Bang's officers guarding Xingyang, felt that Wei Bao was not trustworthy given that he had betrayed Liu Bang before. Zhou Ke thus executed Wei Bao.
