= Longyang (disambiguation) =

Longyang is a district of the city of Baoshan, Yunnan province, China.

Longyang may also refer to:

- Longyang (龍陽), a character in the video game by Softstar Entertainment Chinese Paladin 3 and the same title television series
- Longyang Road station, an interchange station
- Longyang Subdistrict, a subdistrict, Hanshou County in Hunan, China
- Kunzang Longyang
- Lord Longyang, the favorite and lover of an unknown king of Wei

== See also ==
- Longyan
- Long Yang
- Longyangcun station
- Longyangxia, Qinghai
- Longyangxia Dam
