= Wang Wei (disambiguation) =

Wang Wei (699–761) was a Chinese musician, painter, poet, and politician of the middle Tang dynasty.

Wang Wei may also refer to:

== Historical figures ==
- Wang Wei (Liang dynasty) (died 552), official under the Liang dynasty rebel Hou Jing
- Wang Wei (Gējì) (1597–1647), Ming dynasty female singer and poet

== Entrepreneurs ==
- Wang Wei (SF Express) (born 1971), founder of SF Express
- Gary Wang (Chinese businessman) or Wang Wei (born 1973), founder of Tudou.com
- William Wang or Wang Wei, founder of Vizio

== Sportspeople ==
- Wang Wei (fencer) (born 1958), Chinese fencer
- Wei Wang (table tennis) (born 1961), Chinese-born American table tennis player
- Wang Wei (ice hockey) (born 1977), Chinese ice hockey player
- Wang Wei (baseball) (born 1978), Chinese baseball player
- Wang Wei (badminton) (born 1979), Chinese badminton player
- Wang Wei (sailor) (born 1988), Chinese Olympic sailor
- Wang Wei (footballer) (born 1989), Chinese footballer
- Wang Wei (sledge hockey) (born 1994), Chinese sledge hockey player

== Others ==
- Wang Wei (physicist) (1937–2023), Chinese physicist
- Wang Wei (PRC politician) (born 1960), former official in the Central Commission for Discipline Inspection
- 王偉 (1968–2001), Chinese air force pilot who died in the Hainan Island incident
- Wei Zi (born 1956), real name Wang Wei, Chinese actor
- Wei Wang (computer scientist), professor at the University of California, Los Angeles

== See also ==
- Wang Jingwei regime, also known as the Wang Wei regime
- Wei Wang (disambiguation), a list of people with this royal title
