= 228 BC =

228 BC in various calendars
Gregorian calendar	228 BC; CCXXVIII BC
Ab urbe condita	526
Ancient Egypt era	XXXIII dynasty, 96
Pharaoh	Ptolemy III Euergetes, 19
Ancient Greek Olympiad (summer)	138th Olympiad (victor)¹
Assyrian calendar	4523
Balinese saka calendar	N/A
Bengali calendar	−821 – −820
Berber calendar	723
Buddhist calendar	317
Burmese calendar	−865
Byzantine calendar	5281–5282
Chinese calendar	壬申年 (Water Monkey); 2470 or 2263 — to — 癸酉年 (Water Rooster); 2471 or 2264
Coptic calendar	−511 – −510
Discordian calendar	939
Ethiopian calendar	−235 – −234
Hebrew calendar	3533–3534
- Hindu calendars
Vikram Samvat	−171 – −170
Shaka Samvat	N/A
Kali Yuga	2873–2874
Holocene calendar	9773
Iranian calendar	849 BP – 848 BP
Islamic calendar	875 BH – 874 BH
Javanese calendar	N/A
Julian calendar	N/A
Korean calendar	2106
Minguo calendar	2139 before ROC 民前2139年
Nanakshahi calendar	−1695
Seleucid era	84/85 AG
Thai solar calendar	315–316
Tibetan calendar	ཆུ་ཕོ་སྤྲེ་ལོ་ (male Water-Monkey) −101 or −482 or −1254 — to — ཆུ་མོ་བྱ་ལོ་ (female Water-Bird) −100 or −481 or −1253

Year 228 BC was a year of the pre-Julian Roman calendar. At the time it was known as the Year of the Consulship of Ruga and Verrucosus (or, less frequently, year 526 Ab urbe condita). The denomination 228 BC for this year has been used since the early medieval period, when the Anno Domini calendar era became the prevalent method in Europe for naming years.

== Events ==
=== By place ===
==== Carthage ====
- The Carthaginian general Hamilcar Barca is killed in a battle in Hispania, ending his lengthy campaign to conquer the Iberian Peninsula for Carthage. In eight years, by force of arms and diplomacy, he has secured an extensive territory in the Iberian Peninsula, but his death in battle prevents him from completing the conquest. Command of his army in the Iberian Peninsula passes to his son-in-law Hasdrubal.
- Hasdrubal makes immediate policy changes, emphasizing the use of diplomatic rather than military methods for expanding Carthaginian Hispania and dealing with Rome. He founds Carthago Nova or New Carthage (modern Cartagena) as his capital city.

==== Asia Minor ====
- King Attalus I Soter of Pergamum defeats Antiochus Hierax (brother of the Seleucid king Seleucus II) in three battles and thereby gains control over all the Seleucid domains in Anatolia except Cilicia in the southeast.

==== Greece ====
- The Illyrian queen Teuta's governor, Demetrius of Pharos has little alternative but to surrender to the overwhelming Roman force. In return, the Romans award him a considerable part of Teuta's holdings to counter-balance the power of Teuta. Meanwhile, the Roman army lands further north at Apollonia. The combined Roman army and fleet proceed northward together, subduing one town after another and besieging Shkodra, the Illyrian capital.
- Archidamus V, brother of the murdered Spartan King Agis IV, is called back to Sparta by the Agiad King Cleomenes III, who has no counterpart on the throne by then. However, Archidamus V is assassinated shortly after returning.

==== China ====
- The State of Qin, its armies led by Wang Jian, completes the conquest of the State of Zhao.
- The remnants of the Zhao monarchy form a remnant state in Dai.

== Deaths ==
- Ai of Chu, king of the Chu State (Warring States Period)
- Archidamus V, king of Sparta of the Eurypontid line
- Arsames I, king of Armenia, Sophene and Commagene
- Hamilcar Barca, Carthaginian general who has assumed command of the Carthaginian forces in Sicily during the last years of the First Punic War with Rome, helped Carthage win the Mercenary War and brought extensive territory in the Iberian Peninsula under Carthaginian control (b. c. 270 BC)
- You of Chu, king of the Chu State (Warring States Period)
