= Caozhuang =

Cáozhuāng (曹庄) may refer to the following locations in China:

Towns

- Caozhuang, Anhui, in Dangshan County
- Caozhuang, Liaoning, in Xingcheng
- Caozhuang, Linshu County, Shandong

Townships

- Caozhuang Township, Hebei, in Jize County
- Caozhuang Township, Shandong, in Shan County
