= King Ai =

King Ai may refer to:

- King Ai of Zhou (died 441 BC)
- King Ai of Chu (died 228 BC)
