= Pingyuan Jun =

Pingyuan Jun may refer to:

- Lord Pingyuan (Chinese: 平原君; pinyin: Píngyuán Jūn, died 251 BC), politician and nobleman of Zhao
- Pingyuan Commandery (Chinese: 平原郡; pinyin: Píngyuán Jùn), a historical commandery from the Han to Tang dynasties
