= Lord Longyang =

Lover of a king of Wei during the Warring States period

Lord Longyang (traditional Chinese: 龍陽君; simplified Chinese: 龙阳君; pinyin: Lóngyáng Jūn; Wade–Giles: Lung Yang Jun) was the favorite and lover of an unknown king of Wei, often speculated to be either King Anxi or King Jia, during the Warring States period of the Zhou dynasty. Little is known about him outside of his relationship with the king. Vivian W. Ng and Robert H. van Gulik describe him as a "minister." In his book Passions of the Cut Sleeve: The Male Homosexual Tradition in China, Bret Hinsch writes that the story of Lord Longyang serves as an example of both the sexual opportunism and openness of homosexuality in Zhou dynasty courts.

== Story ==
The story of Lord Longyang is recorded in the Records of the Warring States (simplified Chinese: 战国策; traditional Chinese: 戰國策; pinyin: Zhànguó cè) in a section called "Records of Wei" (Chinese: 魏策; pinyin: Wèi cè), and does not appear in any other contemporary sources. The Records of the Warring States is generally considered a work of history. In it, Lord Longyang and the king are in a fishing boat together. The king catches a fish but discards it after catching a larger one; Longyang then begins to cry. After the king pressures him to say why he is crying, Longyang reveals that he is afraid that the king will be tempted by other, more beautiful men and lose interest in him. The king then forbids anyone to mention other beauties in his presence under penalty of death. As a result of his status as a favorite of the king, Lord Longyang was given a small fief and a feudal title.

== Influence ==
The story of Lord Longyang influenced later Chinese literature. In the poetry of Ruan Ji, Lord Longyang is used, along with Anling, to figuratively evoke male beauty and love between men, and specifically royal favor. In the story "Wan the Student" from the Ming and Qing collection The Cut Sleeve (simplified Chinese: 断袖篇; traditional Chinese: 斷袖篇; pinyin: Duàn xiù piān), in which Wan falls in love with another male student, Lord Longyang is used (along with Anling) as an example of male beauty. The 1632 book The Forgotten Tales of Longyang or The Forgotten Stories of Longyang (simplified Chinese: 龙阳逸史; traditional Chinese: 龍陽逸史; pinyin: Lóngyáng yìshǐ) tells twenty stories of male same-sex prostitution in the late Ming dynasty. In it, the author, known by the nom de plume "Jingjiang's besotted with bamboo recluse," (Chinese: 京江醉竹居士; pinyin: Jīngjiāng zuì zhú jūshì) uses the story of Lord Longyang to evoke an earlier golden age characterized by feeling; this is juxtaposed with the stories and characters in the collection. The Forgotten Tales of Longyang is mentioned in some biji and lists of prohibited books, but disappeared from the early Qing dynasty until the late 1980s, when a manuscript was discovered in Japan.

The prologue of the late Ming dynasty collection The Rocks Nod Their Heads (simplified Chinese: 石点头; traditional Chinese: 石點頭; pinyin: Shí diǎn tóu) references the story of Lord Longyang, among others, to argue that sexual relationships between men were normal because they had existed since antiquity. Yu Muxia's entry on homosexuality in Shanghai Tidbits (Chinese: 上海鳞爪; pinyin: Shànghǎi línzhǎo) used Longyang to make the same argument. Jian Fu and Xuekun Liu describe netizens similarly using the story of Longyang as evidence that homosexuality was not historically discriminated against in China.

== Use as a euphemism ==
The word longyang is used in China to euphemistically refer to gay men, including in newspapers. However, Zhiqiu Benson Zhou reported in 2022 that the term was "rarely" used, and Jing Wu writes that the term longyang was not well known among young Chinese people by the mid-1990s. Longyang has been used through much of Chinese history, serving as a common classical literary term for male homosexuality. For example, in Cao Xueqin's eighteenth century novel Dream of the Red Chamber, male homosexuality is intimated through the story of character Xue Pan's relations with young boys, which is euphemistically described as "Lord Long-yang's vice." Longyang is also sometimes translated as "catamite," or used to refer specifically to male prostitutes, younger male lovers, or the receptive partner in anal intercourse. Giovanni Vitiello reports that longyang was classically used as a verb. Gary Leupp reports that longyang (Korean: 용양; Hanja: 龍陽; RR: yongyang) was also used to refer to homosexuality in the Goryeo dynasty.

The phrase lóngyáng zhīpǐ (simplified Chinese: 龙阳之癖; traditional Chinese: 龍陽之癖) or lóngyáng pǐ (simplified Chinese: 龙阳癖; traditional Chinese: 龍陽癖), meaning "passion of Longyang," refers to male same-sex attraction or passion, as does lóngyáng zhǐhǎo (simplified Chinese: 龙阳之好; traditional Chinese: 龍陽之好). Lóngyáng yīdào (simplified Chinese: 龙阳一道; traditional Chinese: 龍陽一道), usually translated as "the way of catamites," refers to male-male desire or the "homoerotic phenomenon."
