= Crown Prince Shen =

Crown Prince of the State of Wei (died 342 BC)

- Crown Prince of the State of Wei
- Died: 342 BC
- Father: King Hui of Wei

Crown Prince Shen (Chinese: 太子申, died 342 BC) was a crown prince of the State of Wei during the Warring States period of ancient China. He was also called Wei Shen (魏申).

Shen was the eldest son of King Hui of Wei. In 342 BC, Wei was attacked by Qi. King Hui of Wei appointed Crown Prince Shen as chief commander and Pang Juan as commander, and ordered an army of 100,000 to mobilise against Qi. When the army reached Waihuang (外黃, a place in present-day Lankao County, Kaifeng), Xu Zi (徐子) went to meet him. Xu Zi told him there was no need to defeat the Qi army personally; if the crown prince was defeated, the state of Wei would be destroyed. Shen followed his advice and decided to withdraw, however, Pang Juan persuaded him not to do so. The Wei army was crushed by Qi in the Battle of Maling. Crown Prince Shen was taken captive, and later executed. His head and body were buried in different places, both were in present-day Guan County, Shandong.
