= King Zhao of Wei =

King Zhao of Wei 魏昭王
- King of Wei

King of Wei
- Reign: 295–277 BC
- Predecessor: King Xiang
- Successor: King Anxi
- Died: 277 BC
- Issue: King Anxi of Wei; Lord Xinling; Lady Pingyuan
Names
- Ancestral name: Jī (姬); Lineage name: Wèi (魏); Given name: Chì (遫)
Posthumous name
- King Zhao (昭王)
- House: Ji
- Dynasty: Wei
- Father: King Xiang of Wei

King Zhao of Wei (Chinese: 魏昭王; died 277 BC), personal name Wei Chi (Chinese: 魏遫), was king of the Wei state from 296 BC to 277 BC.

He was the son of King Xiang, whom he succeeded to the throne. During King Zhao's reign, Wei suffered from repeated attacks by the Qin state. In 293 BC, he made an alliance with the Han state against Qin but was defeated by the Qin general Bai Qi with the loss of 240,000 troops and five cities. In 287 BC, Quyang was attacked and in 286 BC, Anyi (the former capital of Wei) and Henei was attacked as well. In an attempt to assist in the attack on Anyi, Qin's ally, the Song state was attacked in turn by the Qi state and defeated at Wenyi (modern-day Wen County, Henan). After a brief alliance (285–284 BC) between the states of Yan, Qin, Han and Zhao against Qi (which was negotiated at the Eastern Zhou capital Luoyang), King Zhao broke the alliance and allied with Qi against Qin.

King Zhao died in 277 BC and was succeeded by his son King Anxi.
