= Mao Sui =

Mao Sui (Chinese: 毛遂; pinyin: Máo Suì‌; fl. 3rd century BC) was a retainer of Lord Pingyuan, namely Zhao Sheng during the Warring States period of ancient China. He was born in the Zhao state (current Hebei province) and lived in Zhao for three years but success eluded him. In 257 BC, after the Battle of Changping, Zhao refused to cede territory to the Qin. As a result, Qin attacked Handan, the capital of Zhao. On its part, Zhao sought assistance from the Chu state. Mao Sui recommended himself to the Chu State and was successful in persuading the Chu to assist Zhao. In return, Mao Sui gained fame, and it was widely believed that: "A good tongue of Mao Sui is stronger than a million soldiers."

== Biography ==
=== Background ===
Mao Sui was born in Jize. Acknowledged for outstanding intelligence and talent as a young man, he succeeded in both academic and military training. He went to Handan, the capital of Zhao, and was introduced to Lord Pingyuan. Pingyuan had more than 3,000 retainers that had been employed in various capacities, such as civil and military strategists, guardians, butchers, liquor sellers, etc. In 257 BC, Qin army besieged Handan. Having realized that Handan was endangered, Mao Sui helped the Chu and Zhao form an alliance. He was then awarded the position of imperial adviser by the king of Zhao.

=== Mao Sui zi jian ===
During the Warrior states period, after the Battle of Changping, Qin had completely vanquished Zhao. The army general of Qin, Bai Qi wanted to push his advantage and lead soldiers to besiege the capital of Zhao, Handan. Qin's army went ahead and besieged Handan, and the situation was extremely dangerous. The king of Zhao ordered Prince Ping Yuan to ask for help from the Chu. Prince Ping Yuan summoned all his attendants and selected 20 civil and military officers to go together. He had already picked 19 attendees, and only one remained to be picked.

At this point, Mao Sui came forward and recommended himself to Prince Ping Yuan. He said: "My lord, I heard that you will go to the Chu state to sign covenant with them. You also wish to take 20 attendants with you, but now there is still one person missing, so I want to follow you to Chu state." Prince Ping Yuan asked him: "How long have you been with me?" "3 years," he answered. Prince Ping Yuan said: "A talented person is like an awl in the bag, the awl will poke the bag and show its ability immediately. You have been with me for 3 years but did not show your ability, I have never heard of you. This is because you do not have any talents. Therefore, you cannot follow with us, just stay behind!" Mao Sui answered: "My lord, today is the date when I ask you to put me in your bag. I will show up my ability. If you had put me in the bag earlier, I may have already pierced the whole bag!" Finally, Prince Ping Yuan agreed and included Mao Sui in the group.

When Prince Ping Yuan and his attendants arrived at the Chu, the king of Chu only met Prince Ping Yuan. They negotiated from morning till afternoon in the palace, but it did not yield any concrete results. Mao Sui strode up the steps and shouted from afar: "The matter of sending troops is either harmless or profitable. It is very simple and clear, then why do you still hesitate?" Mao Sui had interrupted their conversation. This angered the king, and he asked Prince Ping Yuan: "Who is he?" Prince Ping Yuan answered: "He is Mao Sui, he is my attendant." The king shouted to Mao Sui: "Get out! I am talking to your master, how dare you! Why do you interrupt us?" Mao Sui realized that the king was angry. He was not afraid, but moved even closer to the monarch. He held his sword to the king and said: "Your Majesty, the reason you have the courage to yell at me is simply because you are the king with many bodyguards. But now no one can protect you, I can just cut your head off immediately. Your Majesty, your life is in my hands!" The king was scared and decided to listen to him. Mao Sui did not ask for help from Chu directly. He persuaded the king from another angle. He said: "Qin defeated you in the battle of Yanying and (the army general Bai Qi led the soldiers to defeat Chu in this battle. The capital of Chu, Yan, was lost and soldiers from Qin also burned the king's tomb of Chu and killed thousands of people). You lost your capital and retreated to Chen (current Henan province), your people were killed, and your ancestor's tomb and civilization were destroyed. Don't you feel ashamed? Even I feel ashamed of you! If you assist Zhao, it would benefit both of us. This is a good opportunity for you to take revenge. Don't you want to redeem your reputation and dignity?" Then he continued: "Now that we are here, we can put up a united front against Qin. It is for Chu rather than for Zhao, but you are so tardy in stating your position. What right do you have to yell at me in front of my master?"

Mao Sui's words made the king feel very embarrassed, but at the same time it aroused within him the will to fight. Thus, he, Prince Ping Yuan and Mao Sui licked the blood of animal (usually chicken) and swore (This was a tradition of oath in ancient China, the idea was that putting blood on the mouth solemnified the words of the treaty of alliance, and signified the punishment that would come on whoever broke the agreement)

Three months later, the allied forces of Zhao and the Chu defeated Qin's army and saved Han Dan. After Prince Ping Yuan returned to Zhao, he treated Mao Sui as the most honorable guest. He said with a deep sigh: "This time King of the Chu will never look down upon Zhao just because of Mao Sui."

=== Later life ===
There are very few records about Mao Sui except 'Mao Sui zi jian', but this story is very famous in China. There are very few records about him after 'Mao Sui zi jian' in the gazetteer, Jize Xian Zhi. Although he was conferred the title of imperial adviser after 'Mao Sui zi jian', but due to jealousy from other officers, king of Zhao also did not adopt Mao Sui's admonishments anymore. Mao Sui felt he was underrated by the king. So he resigned and returned to his hometown. Having reached his hometown, he stayed for 20 years and lived with the village folk. In 230 BC, there was a drought in Jize, in which all the crops withered. People from other villages had to leave their hometowns and beg for a living. At this time, Mao Sui spent all his savings to help his folks, so that they could get over this famine. In return, they all appreciated Mao Sui's generosity.

== Mao Sui park ==
The only one named as such, Mao Sui park is located in the Jize county of Hebei province. In order to popularize the spirit and culture of Mao Sui, this park perfectly combines historical culture with modern humanistic spirit and natural ecology. Mao Sui park was built in 2009, and it has been improved upon over the years. The park comprises 8 hectares of lakes, 6 hectares of hills, 19 hectares of greenery, landscaping and cultural facilities. The total area is 33 hectares. It has truly integrated the lake, forests, mountains and culture seamlessly. In terms of structure, the park is divided into one lake, one mountain, three islands, eight scenic spots and nine districts, and is incorporated with eight historical and cultural landscapes. At the same time, the park also includes recreation, viewing and water sports, all of which render it a good venue for leisure and entertainment for the surrounding residents.

Mao Sui was born in Jize county, and here it is a household name. The statue of Mao Sui on the square occupies the center of the park, and serves to highlight the profound contribution of 'Mao Sui'. Therefore, the park has been named as 'Mao Sui Park'. It also reflects the pride of local people. The park has nine functional areas, such as the square area, the plants area and so on, which serve as viable open spaces for people to enjoy fitness and leisure.

During the Spring Festival of 2016 when various cultural events were held, Mao Sui Park created a new record of the number of tourists, having received more than 30,000 visitors per day and ranking first in the list of the province's 4A-level parks.

During the Spring Festival of 2017, number of tourists visiting Mao Sui Park once again established a new record. Total number of visitors reached more than 160,000 people, and the daily flow was pegged at more than 50,000 people.

== Mao Sui Statue ==
Mao Sui statue was completed in 2012 and is located in Mao Sui theme park. Currently, it is the largest single statue in China and is made of red sandstone. It depicts that Mao Sui held a long sword in his left hand. Stretching to a height of 11.09 meters, it weighs 142 tons. This statue has been designed by Tianjin Academy of Fine Arts. The sculpture also reflects the iconic viewpoint of Mao Sui theme park.

== Film ==
To promote and instill the spirit of 'Mao Sui', Propaganda Department of Hebei Provincial Party Committee, Hebei film and TV Production Center and Propaganda Department of Jize county joined hands in cooperation to make the film titled legend of Mao Sui (毛遂传奇). This film reinterprets the story of 'MAO SUI ZI JIAN' that took place 2200 years ago, and highlights the contribution of Mao Sui as also his outstanding character. The film was based in the Warring States era, and focused on the famous Hebei persuader Mao Sui. When the Qin State besieged Zhao State, Mao Sui volunteered to go to the Chu State with Prince Ping Yuan of Zhao Sheng. Mao Sui persuaded the king of Chu to send troops to save Zhao State which was in danger. The film revolves around the legend of Mao Sui because of his courage and bravery. This film was released in China in 2013 and will be released overseas by HuaXia Film Distribution Co., Ltd.

== Idiom ==
This historical story also finds a place in form of a famous idiom in China, 毛遂自薦 'Máo Suì zì jiàn' which means to volunteer for a task or to recommend oneself. This idiom is usually used as a compliment. Mao Sui was a brave person and his self-recommendation is representative of his brave character. It serves as a metaphor for someone that must be brave enough and responsible enough to deal with things.

== Tomb ==
There are two records pertaining to Mao Sui's grave. The first record in the Yong Nian Xian Zhi shows that the grave is in the Hebei province, Yong Nian county. The second record shows his grave to be in current Shandong province according to the gazetteerTeng Xian Zhi. The grave in Shandong had been destroyed in the Cultural Revolution. In the spring of 1991, people in Guanqiao town along with the Government rebuilt the tomb, and it was completed in the autumn of the same year. The tomb was dome-shaped. Famous calligrapher Wang Xuezhong's inscription titled "Tomb of Mao Sui" is placed at the front of the tomb. In 1992, the wall and gate constructions were completed with small bricks and small tiles. In the summer of 1998, a 5-meter high monument was built in front of the tomb.

== Historical record ==
Records of the Grand Historian (also called shiji), sector 76. ‘PING YUAN JUN YU QING LIE ZHUAN’, sector 16.
