= Zhumushan =

Subdistrict in Hunan, China

Coordinates: 28.83452°N 111.953°E

Zhumushan Subdistrict (Chinese: 株木山街道; pinyin: Zhūmùshān Jiēdào) is a subdistrict of Hanshou County in Hunan, China. Dividing a part of the former Zhumushan Township (Chinese: 株木山乡) and two villages of Taizimiao Town (Chinese: 太子庙镇), the subdistrict was established in December 2015. It has an area of 65.85 km^{2} (25.42 sq mi) with a population of about 32,600 (as of 2016). The subdistrict has 16 communities and 6 villages under its jurisdiction, and its seat is Xincheng Community (Chinese: 新城社区).
