= Futudian Township =

Futudian Township 浮图店乡
- Township
- Location in Hebei
- Coordinates: 36°53′01″N 114°46′07″E
- Country: People's Republic of China
- Province: Hebei
- Prefecture-level city: Handan
- County: Jize
- Village-level divisions: 20 villages
- Elevation: 45 m (148 ft)
- Time zone: UTC+8 (China Standard)
- Area code: 0310

Futudian Township (simplified Chinese: 浮图店乡; traditional Chinese: 浮圖店鄉; pinyin: Fútúdiàn Xiāng) is a township of Jize County in southern Hebei province, China, located about 10 kilometres (6.2 mi) southwest of the county seat. As of 2011, it has 16 villages under its administration.

== See also ==
- List of township-level divisions of Hebei
