= Lord Xinling =

One of the Four Lords of the Warring States (died c.243 BC)

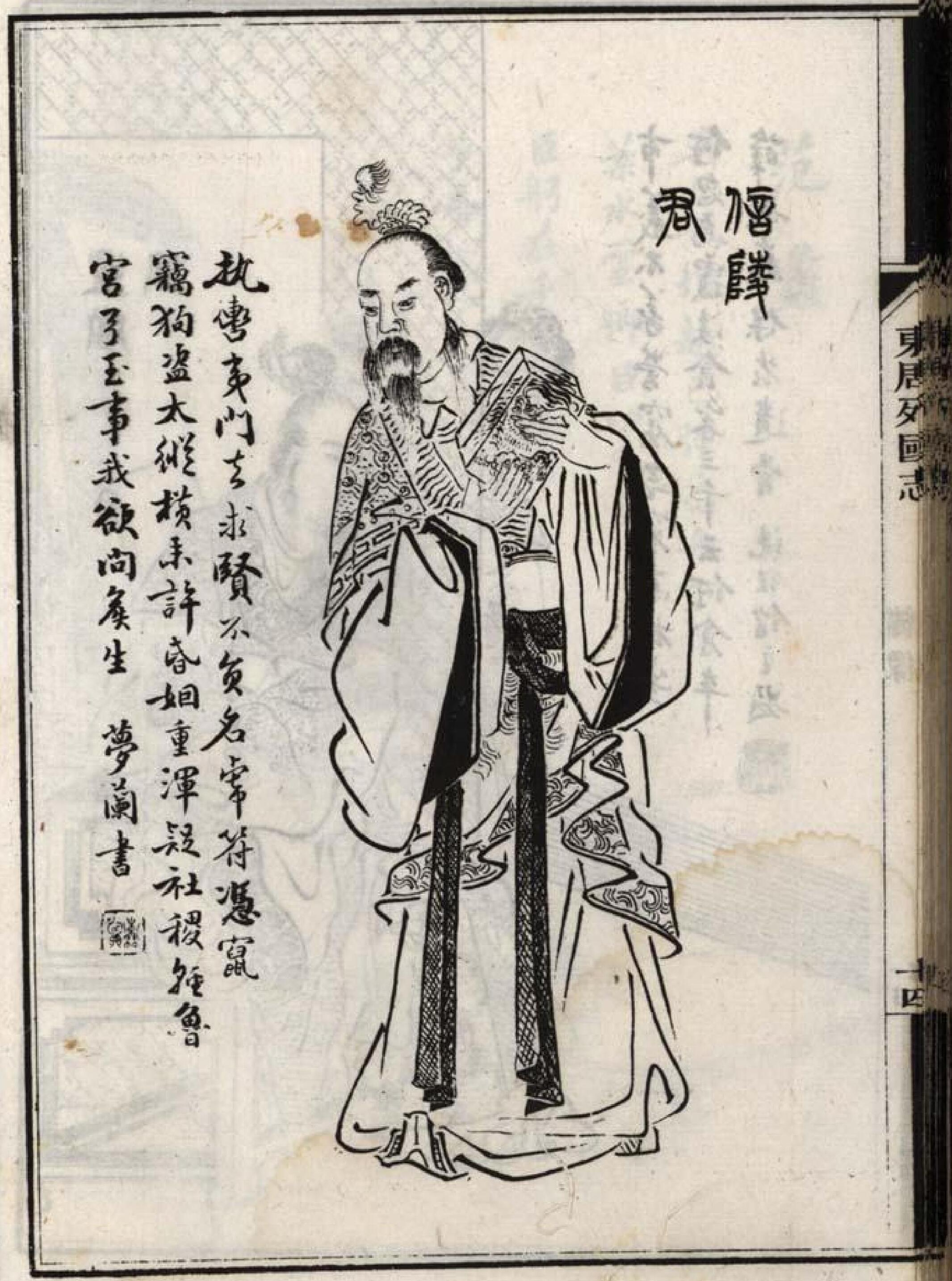
Lord Xinling as depicted in an illustrated edition of Chronicles of the Eastern Zhou Kingdoms (1890)

Lord Xinling (Chinese: 信陵君, died c.243 BC), born Wei Wuji (魏無忌), was a prominent aristocrat, statesman and general of the Warring States period and one of the Four Lords of the Warring States. (Note: The other three were Lord Mengchang, Lord Pingyuan and Lord Chunshen.) The son of King Zhao of Wei, and the half-brother of King Anxi of Wei, he served the State of Wei as Senior General.

== Biography ==
The title 'Xinling' refers to Wei Wuji's fief in Xinling (present day Ningling County in Henan), which was awarded to him by his half brother King Anxi on the death of their father in 277 BC.

=== House guests ===
The concept of house guests (門客) refers to a social institution during the period when aristocrats would provide food and lodging to talented men and use them as retainers. Lord Xinling, famed for his readiness to provide for talented men, had three thousand retainers in his service at its peak.

=== The Battle of Handan ===
When Qin invaded Zhao and besieged its capital Handan, Lord Pingyuan, another of the Four Lords, requested help from Xinling, who was his brother-in-law. Xinling was unable to get help from his master, the King of Wei. However, the Queen of Wei saw him as a benefactor, as he had once arrested the man who murdered her father, so she helped him secure the imperial seal. Using the seal, Xinling attempted to seize control of the Wei army, but was met with refusal from the Wei general Jin Bi (晉鄙). Xinling then sent a retainer called Zhu Hai (朱亥), who assassinated General Jin by pummelling the latter to death with a heavy hammer, and installed Zhu Hai as his own general. Together, they marched to Handan and successfully defeated the Qin forces, relieving the siege. He was honored by the King of Zhao above his own brother-in-law and Lord Chunshen of Chu. However, his own half-brother King Anxi was angry with the theft of the seal and the summary killing of General Jin, so Xinling stayed in Zhao for many years rather than returning to face the wrath of his own king in Wei.

=== Later achievements ===
When Qin invaded Wei itself, the King of Wei requested Xinling to rescue him. Xinling returned and repulsed a greater Qin force with the help of other allies such as Yan, Zhao, and Chu. The only state that he ignored was the powerful state of Qi. After this victory, Xinling was made Prime Minister of Wei, and wrote his own war treatise.

=== Death ===
However, Qin later tricked Wei by spreading rumors that Xinling aimed to seize the throne of Wei for himself. They did it in a convincing manner employing a corrupt insider (senior noble) and tricking the Crown Prince of Wei, who was a prisoner in Qin. The King of Wei suspected Xinling but did not take action. Xinling, disappointed with his own brother, resigned. In his retirement, Xinling and his retainers drank too much and died. He was much mourned by the grateful citizens of Wei and his admirers in other states, though not by his own King.

Xinling became the epitome of military success that necessitates disobeying superiors and taking initiative at times.
