= King You of Chu =

King of Chinese state of Chu from 237 to 228 BC

King You of Chu 楚幽王

King of Chu
- Reign: 237–228 BC
- Predecessor: King Kaolie
- Successor: King Ai
- Died: 228 BC
Names
- Ancestral name: Mǐ (羋); Lineage name: Xióng (熊); Given name: Hàn (悍)
Posthumous name
- King You (幽王)
- House: Mi
- Dynasty: Chu
- Father: King Kaolie
- Mother: Queen Li (李后)

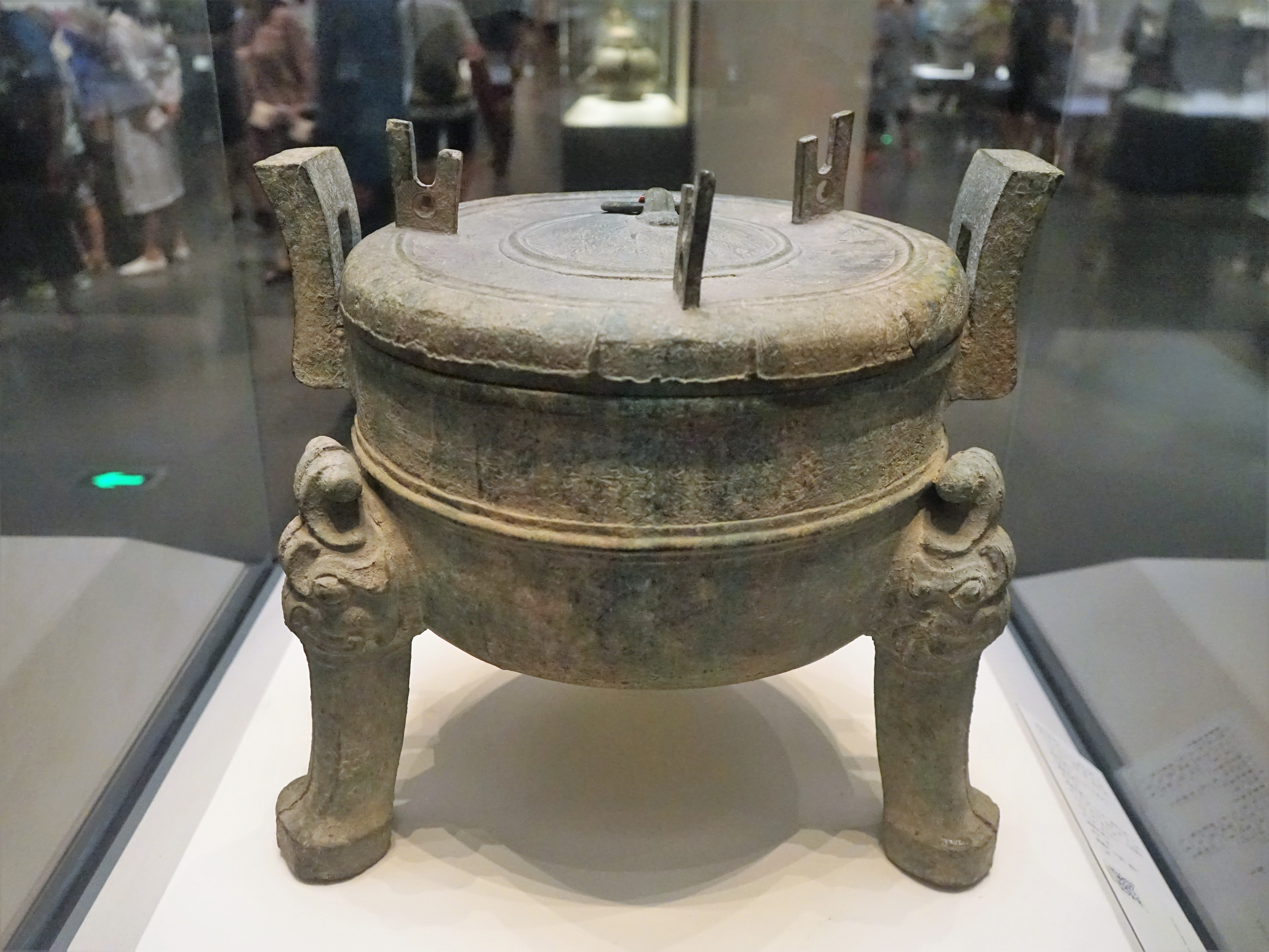
Bronze Ding conmissioned by Xiong Han. Unearthed at Zhujiaji, Shou County, Anhui, in 1933.

King You of Chu (Chinese: 楚幽王; pinyin: Chǔ Yōu Wáng), personal name Xiong Han, was a king of the Chu state.

Succeeding his father, King Kaolie, King You reigned from 237 BC to 228 BC. During his reign, King You's maternal uncle, Li Yuan (李園) served as prime minister.

In 235 BC, after an attack on the Zhao state, troops from the states of Qin and Wei united to attack Chu but suffered a defeat.

In March 228 BC, King You died and was succeeded by his younger brother, King Ai.

It is rumoured that King You was the illegitimate son of Lord Chunshen.

In the 1930s, King You's tomb at Shou County, Anhui Province was destroyed by warlords, and many artifacts were dispersed, but a great bronze cauldron was preserved and is on display in Anhui Museum.

King You of Chu House of Mi Died: 228 BC
Regnal titles
Preceded by King Kaolie of Chu	King of Chu; 237–228 BC	Succeeded by King Ai of Chu
