= Canglang, Hanshou =

Subdistrict in Hunan, China

Coordinates: 28°52′29.6″N 111°56′42.4″E

Canglang Subdistrict (Chinese: 沧浪街道; pinyin: Cānglàng Jiēdào) is a subdistrict of Hanshou County in Hunan, China. Dividing a part of the former Zhumushan Township (Chinese: 株木山乡), the subdistrict was established in December 2015. It has an area of 13.76 km^{2} (5.31 sq mi) with a population of about 26,000 (as of 2016). The subdistrict has 4 communities and 11 villages under its jurisdiction.
