= Hanshou County =

Hanshou County 汉寿县 Hanshow
- County
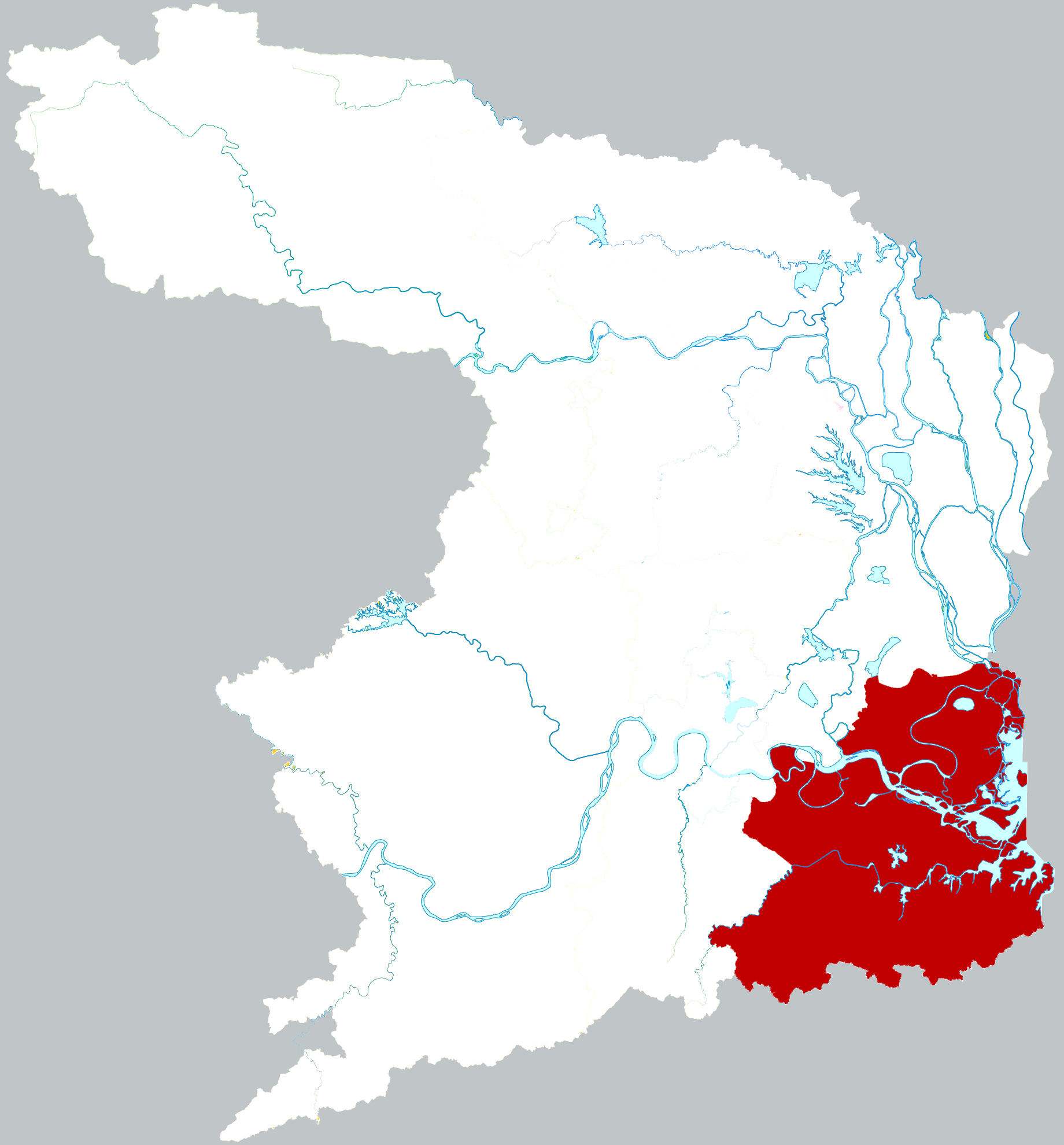
- Location of Hanshou County within Changde

- Location in Hunan
- Coordinates: 28°52′30″N 112°00′22″E
- Country: People's Republic of China
- Province: Hunan
- Prefecture-level city: Changde

Area
  - Total: 2,023 km^{2} (781 sq mi)

Population
  - Total: 706,300
  - Density: 349.1/km^{2} (904.3/sq mi)
- Time zone: UTC+8 (China Standard)

Hanshou County (simplified Chinese: 汉寿县; traditional Chinese: 漢壽縣; pinyin: Hànshòu Xiàn) is a county in Hunan Province, China, under the administration of Changde prefecture-city. The County is located on the north in Hunan Province and the southeast in Changde City, it borders to the north and the west by Dingcheng District, to the south by Ziyang District of Yiyang City and Taojiang County, and to the east by Yuanjiang and Nan County. It has an area of 2,091.3 kilometres (1,299.5 mi) with registered population of 821,266 (as of 2015). It is divided into four subdistricts, 16 towns and three townships under its jurisdiction. The county seat is Longyang Subdistrict (龙阳街道).

== History ==
Abundant source of waters and rivers make Hanshou County a productive fish and rice area. Dongting Lake was once the largest lake in China. This changed in the 1950s when the national Chinese government encouraged plantation of rice and built many dams in the lake. The area of Dongting Lake shrank dramatically. Owing to the river network in this district, a land transportation system was underdeveloped. The YuanJiang river splits the county into two parts, the so-called west lake region and the downtown region of Hanshou. Due to this fact, people from west lake region used to take a whole day to come all the way to the downtown because there was no bridge across the river, and cars and travelers have to count on the ferry to cross Yuan Jiang. In 2008, the YuanJiang Grand Bridge was constructed alleviating transportation across the river.

== Administrative divisions ==
According to the result on adjustment of township-level administrative divisions of Hanshou County on November 20, 2015 Hanshou County has four subdistricts, 16 towns and three townships under its jurisdiction. They are:

16 Towns

- Bailuqiao (百禄桥镇)
- Canggang (沧港镇)
- Cuijiaqiao (崔家桥镇)
- Fengjiapu (丰家铺镇)
- Guantouzhen (罐头嘴镇)
- Jiangjiazui (蒋家嘴镇)
- Junshanpu (军山铺镇)
- Longtanqiao (龙潭桥镇)
- Potou (坡头镇)
- Taizimiao (太子庙镇)
- Xihu (西湖镇)
- Yangtaohu (洋淘湖镇)
- Yanwanghu (岩汪湖镇)
- Yougang (酉港镇)
- Zhoukou (洲口镇)
- Zhujiapu (朱家铺镇)

3 Townships

- Maojiatan (毛家滩回族维吾尔族乡)
- Niejiaqiao (聂家桥乡)
- Xizhou (西洲乡)

4 Subdistricts

- Canglang (沧浪街道)
- Chenyang (辰阳街道)
- Longyang (龙阳街道)
- Zhumushan (株木山街道)

== Climate ==
Climate data for Hanshou, elevation 32 m (105 ft), (1991–2020 normals, extremes 1981–present)
Month	Jan	Feb	Mar	Apr	May	Jun	Jul	Aug	Sep	Oct	Nov	Dec	Year
Record high °C (°F)	23.3 (73.9)	30.2 (86.4)	36.0 (96.8)	35.6 (96.1)	36.5 (97.7)	38.1 (100.6)	39.9 (103.8)	40.4 (104.7)	38.2 (100.8)	35.1 (95.2)	30.8 (87.4)	25.1 (77.2)	40.4 (104.7)
Mean daily maximum °C (°F)	8.4 (47.1)	11.3 (52.3)	15.9 (60.6)	22.2 (72.0)	26.8 (80.2)	29.9 (85.8)	33.2 (91.8)	32.5 (90.5)	28.1 (82.6)	22.7 (72.9)	17.0 (62.6)	11.1 (52.0)	21.6 (70.9)
Daily mean °C (°F)	5.0 (41.0)	7.5 (45.5)	11.8 (53.2)	17.7 (63.9)	22.4 (72.3)	25.8 (78.4)	29.0 (84.2)	28.2 (82.8)	23.8 (74.8)	18.3 (64.9)	12.7 (54.9)	7.3 (45.1)	17.5 (63.4)
Mean daily minimum °C (°F)	2.6 (36.7)	4.8 (40.6)	8.8 (47.8)	14.4 (57.9)	19.0 (66.2)	22.8 (73.0)	25.8 (78.4)	25.2 (77.4)	20.8 (69.4)	15.3 (59.5)	9.7 (49.5)	4.6 (40.3)	14.5 (58.1)
Record low °C (°F)	−10.6 (12.9)	−4.3 (24.3)	−1.6 (29.1)	2.3 (36.1)	9.9 (49.8)	13.2 (55.8)	18.8 (65.8)	16.6 (61.9)	11.0 (51.8)	4.1 (39.4)	−0.4 (31.3)	−6.3 (20.7)	−10.6 (12.9)
Average precipitation mm (inches)	68.3 (2.69)	78.9 (3.11)	125.7 (4.95)	155.5 (6.12)	193.2 (7.61)	203.4 (8.01)	191.6 (7.54)	112.1 (4.41)	87.5 (3.44)	89.7 (3.53)	81.6 (3.21)	44.6 (1.76)	1,432.1 (56.38)
Average precipitation days (≥ 0.1 mm)	12.2	12.6	15.6	15.5	14.8	14.5	11.2	9.9	9.1	11.3	10.5	10.0	147.2
Average snowy days	5.8	3.0	1.1	0	0	0	0	0	0	0	0.2	2.0	12.1
Average relative humidity (%)	79	79	79	78	79	82	78	79	80	80	80	77	79
Mean monthly sunshine hours	77.9	74.4	100.5	125.9	148.3	140.8	203.9	200.7	148.0	127.0	113.5	100.4	1,561.3
Percentage possible sunshine	24	23	27	33	35	34	48	50	40	36	36	32	35
Source: China Meteorological Administration

== Economy ==
Hanshou has a population of 780,000. Many young people leave the county as migrant workers to south and east coastal areas, e.g. Guangdong, Shanghai, etc., in the hope of finding better jobs and education opportunities for themselves and their next generation. Young children are left at home and often attended by their grandparents.

== Agriculture ==
Hanshou's economy relies mainly on agriculture. Rice, cotton, canola oil, green ramie, Italian aspens, various fishes from the Dongting lake, fleshes are the major products in the county. The settle-in of Zoomlion industrial park is deemed as a milestone for the industry development in this county. It brings as well a large number of jobs to this region. Raw agricultural products are processed by some local companies and exported abroad, for example, onions are cooked and canned to export to Japan by private JiaodeChang, Italian aspens are fabricated by private Guozhen Wooden Co. into shining fire-resistant wedge joint board for house construction in North America. Other state-owned factories such as paper-making company, spinning mill went into bankruptcy several years ago due to environmental pollutions, corruption and low efficiency to compete in the market. Industry in this country is developing gradually with vast configuration change. The eastern part of the county is protected by the state law as a wet land conservation area. Thousands of acres of reeds sprawl across the wet land. Thanks to the enforcement of state law, the ecological system is minimally disturbed by anthropogenic activities in the conservation area and hosts hundreds types of fishes, birds and wild animals. A lot of tourists are attracted to the Western Dongting Lake National Wet Land Park to enjoy the peace and harmony of nature of Dongting Lake.
