= Fuchu of Chu =

King of Chinese state of Chu from 227 to 223 BC

Xiong Fuchu 熊負芻

King of Chu
- Reign: 227–223 BC
- Predecessor: King Ai
- Successor: Xiong Qi
Names
- Ancestral name: Mǐ (羋); Lineage name: Xióng (熊); Given name: Fùchú (負芻)
- House: Mi
- Dynasty: Chu
- Father: King Kaolie or King Qingxiang (disputed)

Xiong Fuchu, commonly known as "Fuchu, King of Chu" (Chinese: 楚王負芻), was from 227 BC to 223 BC the ruler of the Chu state.

Xiong Fuchu usurped the throne in 227 BC after he murdered his younger half-brother, King Ai. In 223 BC he was captured and deposed by the army of the invading Qin state.

Fuchu House of Mi
Regnal titles
Preceded by King Ai of Chu	King of Chu; 227–223 BC	Succeeded by Lord Changping
