= Chenyang, Hanshou =

Subdistrict in Hunan, China

Coordinates: 28°55′28.2″N 111°57′46.8″E

Chenyang Subdistrict (Chinese: 辰阳街道; pinyin: Chényáng Jiēdào) is a subdistrict of Hanshou County in Hunan, China. Dividing a portion of the former Longyang Town (Chinese: 龙阳镇), the subdistrict was established in December 2015. It has an area of 38.6 km^{2} (14.9 sq mi) with a population of about 35,000 (as of 2016). The subdistrict has 3 communities and 9 villages under its jurisdiction.
