= Marquess Wu of Wei =

Chinese ruler of Wei from 396 to 370 BC

Marquess Wu of Wei 魏武侯

Marquess of Wei
- Tenure: 395 – 370 BC
- Predecessor: Marquess Wen
- Successor: King Hui
- Full name: Ancestral name: Jī (姬); Lineage name: Wèi (魏); Given name: Jī (擊)
- Died: 370 BC
- Noble family: Wei
- Father: Marquess Wen

Chinese name
- Chinese: 魏武侯
Transcriptions
Standard Mandarin
- Hanyu Pinyin: Wèi Wǔ Hóu

Marquess Wu of Wei (died 370 BC), personal name Wei Ji, was a ruler of the Wei state. He was a son of the founding monarch, Marquess Wen. He ascended to the Wei throne in 395 BC upon the death of his father. Marquess Wu died in 370 BC and was succeeded by his son, King Hui.
