= Lord Mengchang =

Statesman of the Qi Kingdom (died 279 BC)

Tian Wen
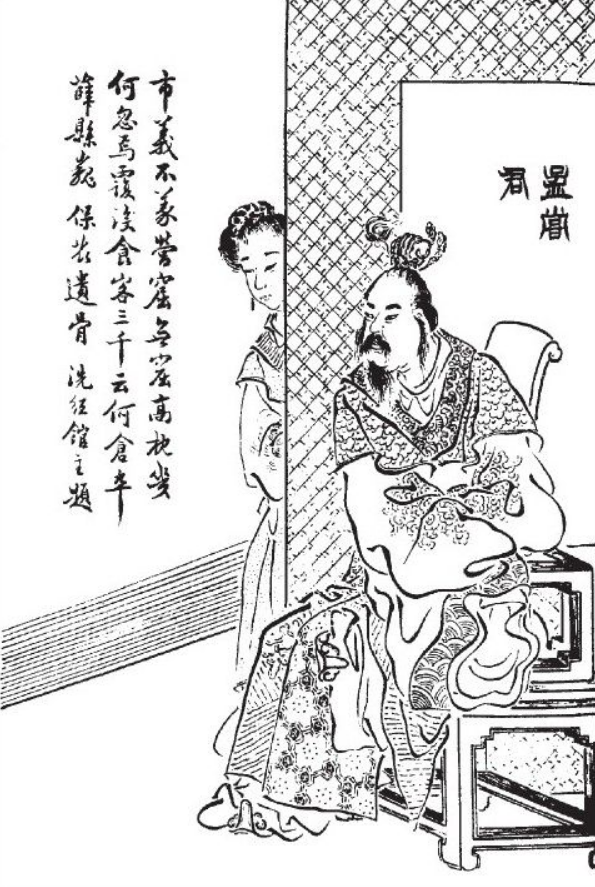
Names
- Family name: Tian; Given name: Wen
- Father: Tian Ying, Lord Jinguo

Lord Mengchang (simplified Chinese: 孟尝君; traditional Chinese: 孟嘗君; pinyin: Mèngchángjūn; died 279 BC), born Tian Wen, was an aristocrat and statesman of the Qi Kingdom of ancient China, one of the famed Four Lords of the Warring States period. (Note: The other three were Lord Xinling, Lord Pingyuan and Lord Chunshen.) He was a son of Tian Ying and grandson of King Wei of Qi. He succeeded to his father's fief in Xue. Lord Mengchang is well known for the size of his entourage. According to the Records of the Grand Historian, he had up to three thousand people in his retinue. Lord Mengchang would eventually become the Chancellor of Qi and of Wei.

== Early childhood ==
Lord Mengchang was born as Tian Wen (田文). His father already had over 40 children by the time he was born and was prepared to let him to starve to death because he was born on the fifth day in the fifth month of the lunar calendar, which was considered a bad omen. Tian Wen was secretly brought up by his mother. At a very young age, he showed promising signs of talent and intelligence and persuaded his father to keep him. One day, the young Tian Wen warned his father that although their lives had dramatically improved over the years, the family clan was in a short supply of intelligent counsellors. His father took his advice and began to welcome commoners to join his clan. Everybody was welcomed, with no regard for age, physical appearance, background, or skill. The guests were given shelter, food and a salary. As a result, people flooded in from all over the province. Because the family treated everybody with respect and honour, the Tian family prospered and Tian Wen's name became well known. When Tian Ying died, Tian Wen became the ruler of the clan by popular demand. He then took the title of Lord Mengchang of Xue.

== Young Lord Mengchang ==
As Lord Mengchang's name spread, people started to come in from all over China. Many had no specific skills or had criminal backgrounds. Lord Mengchang still treated them equally and welcomed them with open arms. The size of his entourage had become a burden for the family's livelihood over the years, but he was still determined to welcome everybody. Every night, Lord Mengchang would serve dinner in the hall with all his entourage in attendance. He would set scribes behind a screen to note every word that was said. He would then study the notes and learn from his advisers, and take care of any needs. One night, during dinner, one of the guests was upset that he could not see what Lord Mengchang was eating because of bad lighting, believing that the advisers were only eating leftovers. Lord Mengchang then stood up, walked to this person's seat and showed him his bowl. It turned out to be the same food. The guest was so ashamed that he killed himself on the spot. Lord Mengchang's praises reached the king of Qin, who sent a messenger to Qi to invite the young lord to meet him. Lord Mengchang wanted to go and meet the king. As he was about to depart, his advisers told him not to, including many natives of Qin, who dissuaded him by explaining the Qin king's questionable motives.

== First trip to Qin ==
In 299 BC, Lord Mengchang was sent to Qin on an official journey. King Zhaoxiang had heard so much about the young lord that he wanted to appoint him as the new Chancellor of Qin. However, King Zhaoxiang was warned by his ministers that Lord Mengchang was still loyal to his homeland of Qi, and soon put Lord Mengchang under house arrest. Desperate, Lord Mengchang sent a messenger to the king of Qin's beloved concubine for help. In exchange for her aid, the woman asked for the snow fox fur coat which Lord Mengchang had already given to the king as a gift when he first arrived in Qin. It was worth a thousand pieces of gold and there was not its like anywhere. King Zhaoxiang kept it in the royal treasury. One of Lord Mengchang's entourage in Qin was a skilled thief. He disguised himself as a dog and sneaked into the treasury under cover of darkness and retrieved the coat. Within two days, Lord Mengchang was released thanks to the pleas of the concubine. Lord Mengchang hired a chariot, forged his documents and dashed to the borders. By midnight of the next day, he had reached Hangu Pass—the last checkpoint of Qin before entering the territories of Qi. King Zhaoxiang had immediately regretted letting Lord Mengchang go and a small army was chasing him to bring him back. The guards at Hangu Pass would not let anyone pass through until the cock-crow at dawn. Lord Mengchang turned to his entourage for help. One of his aides could imitate all types of sounds. He crowed like a rooster, and this woke up the rest of the roosters. Not knowing that Lord Mengchang was being hunted, the guards at the pass then allowed Lord Mengchang and his entourage to enter Qi territory to safety. (Note: This anecdote was the origins of the chengyu "ji ming gou dao" (鸡鸣狗盗), used to describe dishonorable behaviour.)

== Chancellor of Qi ==
Out of guilt, the King of Qi appointed Lord Mengchang as the Chancellor of Qi after his return. Due to his experience in Qin, the new chancellor was gathering allies and asking neighbouring countries like Wei and Han to return past favours and prepare for war against Qin. His adviser warned him of growing power of Qi's neighbouring lands, which would eventually be dangerous for Qi if Qin were not in the equation. Instead, the adviser told the chancellor that it was in the interest of Qi to allow Qin to grow in power. This would maintain the balance of power against Han and Wei so they would still rely heavily on Qi, the most powerful of the three states. The chancellor agreed and proceeded as planned. As his adviser predicted, King Zhaoxiang gave Qi the land and not a single drop of blood was shed among the four states. (Note: However, King Huai of Chu was not allowed to return home; he died in Qin.)

== Legacy ==
Tian Wen died in 279 BC, and he was given the posthumous name "Lord Mengchang". After his death, his sons fought over his fiefdom; the states of Qi and Wei then combined forces to destroy Xue and Tian Wen was left without descendants. However, according to the Wu Lu, two of Lord Mengchang's grandsons, Tian Ling and Tian Guo, survived. Eventually, they moved to Zhuyi (竹邑) and adopted the surname "Xue", after the name of their grandfather's fiefdom. One of Tian Guo's descendants was Xue Zong.

In Vietnamese, Mạnh Thường quân (Sino-Vietnamese for Mengchang Jun) is the term for a philanthropist.

== Ancedotes ==
=== A crafty hare has three burrows ===
One of the well-known Chinese four-character proverbs is jiǎo tù sān kū (狡兔三窟), or "a crafty rabbit has three burrows." It means that a smart rabbit should always have several ways to escape a predator; that is, people should have more than one plan to fall back on.

This chengyu came directly from Lord Mengchang. A member of his entourage, Feng Xuan (冯谖; 馮諼; Féng Xuān), (Note: Feng's name was recorded as "Huan" (驩) in Shiji.) had been destitute when he became Mengchang's retainer. One day, Lord Mengchang asked Feng Xuan to go to the local county to collect overdue taxes. Before he left, Lord Mengchang also asked Feng Xuan to buy and bring back some things needed for the lord's large household. In the county, Feng Xuan made all the wealthy people pay the overdue taxes, but burned all the I.O.U.s for the poor peasants. He told the peasants that Lord Mengchang cared for them and hoped that they would prosper in the coming years. Upon his return, Feng Xuan told Lord Mengchang that he had "bought" benevolence and righteousness (仁义; 仁義; rényì) for him, as those are the items that were most needed in his household. Lord Mengchang was not completely happy, but allowed the matter to drop. A few years later, when Lord Mengchang was forced to flee from the Qi, these people of Xue welcomed him with flowers and food. He was so touched that he turned to Feng Xuan and thanked him for "buying" him benevolence and righteousness. Feng replied he was just doing his job, and while having rényì on one's side is good, it was not enough.

Feng Xuan now told Lord Mengchang that he needed to go to the kingdom of Wei. He would need a fast chariot and much gold. Lord Mengchang agreed and sent Feng Xuan off to see King Xiang of Wei. He told King Xiang that the young Lord Mengchang was an unparalleled talent, who was already being scouted by many other kings. King Xiang was very impressed and told Feng that he could mobilize his army to protect Xue if the young lord were willing to come serve him. Feng then dashed back to Qi in his fast chariot to meet with King Min of Qi. He told King Min that the State of Wei was ready to mobilize its army to occupy Xue, and that if King Min wanted to keep Xue within the control of Qi, he needed to send more gold and troops to Lord Mengchang. Feeling pressured, King Min of Qi complied.

Upon his return to Xue, Feng Xuan congratulated Lord Mengchang, saying, "My lord, now you can rest assured: you have three burrows."
