= Jize County =

Jize County 鸡泽县 Kitseh
- County
- Location in Hebei
- Coordinates: 36°54′N 114°52′E
- Country: People's Republic of China
- Province: Hebei
- Prefecture-level city: Handan
- County seat: Jize Town (鸡泽镇)

Area
  - Total: 337 km^{2} (130 sq mi)
- Elevation: 37 m (121 ft)

Population
  - Total: 250,000
  - Density: 740/km^{2} (1,900/sq mi)
- Time zone: UTC+8 (China Standard)
- Postal code: 057350

Jize County (simplified Chinese: 鸡泽县; traditional Chinese: 雞澤縣; pinyin: Jīzé Xiàn) is a county of southern Hebei province, China. It is under the administration of Handan City, with a population of 250,000 residing in an area of 337 km^{2} (130 sq mi). This is the hometown of Mao Sui (毛遂) of Zhao during the Warring States Period.

== Administrative divisions ==
There are 3 towns and 4 townships under the county's administration.

Towns:

- Jize (鸡泽镇), Xiaozhai (小寨镇), Shuangta (双塔镇)

Townships:

- Fengzheng Township (风正乡), Wuguanying Township (吴官营镇), Futudian Township (浮图店乡), Caozhuang Township (曹庄乡)

== Climate ==
Climate data for Jize, elevation 36 m (118 ft), (1991–2020 normals, extremes 1981–2010)
Month	Jan	Feb	Mar	Apr	May	Jun	Jul	Aug	Sep	Oct	Nov	Dec	Year
Record high °C (°F)	18.3 (64.9)	25.6 (78.1)	30.6 (87.1)	36.7 (98.1)	38.6 (101.5)	42.5 (108.5)	41.5 (106.7)	37.2 (99.0)	38.8 (101.8)	33.5 (92.3)	27.4 (81.3)	25.3 (77.5)	42.5 (108.5)
Mean daily maximum °C (°F)	3.8 (38.8)	8.3 (46.9)	15.1 (59.2)	21.7 (71.1)	27.4 (81.3)	32.5 (90.5)	32.5 (90.5)	30.7 (87.3)	27.1 (80.8)	21.3 (70.3)	12.4 (54.3)	5.4 (41.7)	19.9 (67.7)
Daily mean °C (°F)	−2.1 (28.2)	1.8 (35.2)	8.5 (47.3)	15.2 (59.4)	21.0 (69.8)	26.2 (79.2)	27.4 (81.3)	25.7 (78.3)	20.9 (69.6)	14.6 (58.3)	6.2 (43.2)	−0.4 (31.3)	13.7 (56.8)
Mean daily minimum °C (°F)	−6.8 (19.8)	−3.3 (26.1)	2.8 (37.0)	9.2 (48.6)	14.9 (58.8)	20.3 (68.5)	23.1 (73.6)	21.6 (70.9)	16.0 (60.8)	9.2 (48.6)	1.3 (34.3)	−4.6 (23.7)	8.6 (47.6)
Record low °C (°F)	−20.1 (−4.2)	−19.0 (−2.2)	−10.1 (13.8)	−3.2 (26.2)	2.5 (36.5)	10.2 (50.4)	16.1 (61.0)	12.8 (55.0)	3.5 (38.3)	−2.9 (26.8)	−15.6 (3.9)	−19.2 (−2.6)	−20.1 (−4.2)
Average precipitation mm (inches)	2.8 (0.11)	7.2 (0.28)	9.6 (0.38)	26.4 (1.04)	40.6 (1.60)	53.6 (2.11)	127.0 (5.00)	106.3 (4.19)	46.4 (1.83)	26.2 (1.03)	15.5 (0.61)	3.4 (0.13)	465 (18.31)
Average precipitation days (≥ 0.1 mm)	1.7	2.9	2.7	5.1	6.4	8.0	10.7	9.2	7.0	5.2	4.0	2.4	65.3
Average snowy days	2.4	2.8	0.9	0.2	0	0	0	0	0	0	1.1	2.5	9.9
Average relative humidity (%)	61	56	54	61	63	61	76	81	75	68	69	66	66
Mean monthly sunshine hours	137.5	145.1	194.1	216.4	243.4	213.1	173.3	180.7	171.6	169.5	142.1	135.7	2,122.5
Percentage possible sunshine	44	47	52	55	55	49	39	43	47	49	47	46	48
Source: China Meteorological Administration
