= Longyang, Hanshou =

Subdistrict in Hanshou County, Hunan, China

Coordinates: 28°54′28″N 111°57′47″E

Longyang Subdistrict (Chinese: 龙阳街道; pinyin: Lóngyáng Jiēdào) is a subdistrict and the county seat of Hanshou County in Hunan, China. Dividing a part of the former Longyang Town (Chinese: 龙阳镇), the subdistrict was established in December 2015. It has an area of 31.356 km^{2} (12.107 sq mi) with a population of about 80,991 (as of 2016). The subdistrict has 11 communities and 5 villages under its jurisdiction, and its seat is Chengnan Community (Chinese: 城南社区).

== Communities and villages ==
11 communities and 5 villages of Longyang Subdistrict
Communities and villages		Communities and villages	
English	Chinese	English	Chinese
Baotahe Community	宝塔河社区	Longzhuyuan Community	龙珠园社区
Chengbei Community	城北社区	Nanjiao Community	南郊社区
Chengdong Community	城东社区	Xinjie Community	新街社区
Chengnan Community	城南社区	Sugongti Village	粟公堤村
Chengxi Community	城西社区	Sujiapu Village	苏家铺村
Huamulan Community	花木兰社区	Wanghaiping Village	王海坪村
Huancheng Community	环城社区	Zhangjiahu Village	张家湖村
Hucheng Community	护城社区	Zhenlongge Village	镇龙阁村
