= King Jingmin of Wei =

King...circa 230BC

King Jingmin of Wei 魏景湣王

King of Wei
- Reign: 242–228 BC
- Predecessor: King Anxi
- Successor: Wei Jia
- Died: 228 BC
- Issue: Wei Jia; Wei Jiu; Wei Bao
Names
- Ancestral name: Jī (姬); Lineage name: Wèi (魏); Given name: Zēng (增) or Wǔ (午)
Posthumous name
- King Jingmin (景湣王 or 景愍王 or 景閔王) or King Jing (景王) or King Min (湣王 or 愍王 or 閔王)
- House: Ji
- Dynasty: Wei
- Father: King Anxi of Wei

King Jingmin of Wei (Chinese: 魏景湣王; died 228 BC), personal name Wei Wu (Chinese: 魏午), was the penultimate king of the Wei state. He was a son of his predecessor, King Anxi. He made an alliance with the states of Han, Zhao, Yan and Chu against the Qin state. This alliance failed with Han's destruction by Qin in 230 BC

In King Jingmin's 1st year, 242 BC, Qin General Meng Ao (蒙驁) attacked Wei's Suanzao (酸棗), Yan (燕, a city, not the state), Xu (虛), Changping (長平), Yongqiu (雍丘), and Shanyangcheng (山陽城), taking 20 cities, Qin established Dong Commandery (東郡). In his 2nd Year, 241 BC, Wei joined Zhao, Han, Chu, Wey, and Yan in attacking Qin. In his 3rd Year, 240 BC, Qin captured Wei's Long (龍), Gu (孤), Qingdu (慶都), and Ji (汲). In his 4th year, 239 BC, Wei gave Ye (鄴) to Zhao. In his 5th Year, 238 BC, Qin captured Wei's Yuan (垣) and Puyang (蒲陽), Qin general Yang Duanhe (楊端和) then attacked Wei's Yanshi (衍氏). In his 15th Year, 228 BC, the same year the Zhao capital Handan fell to Qin, King Jingmin died and was succeeded by his son King Jia.
