= Lord Pingyuan =

Nobleman in ancient China (died 251 BC)

Zhao Sheng
- Lord Pingyuan
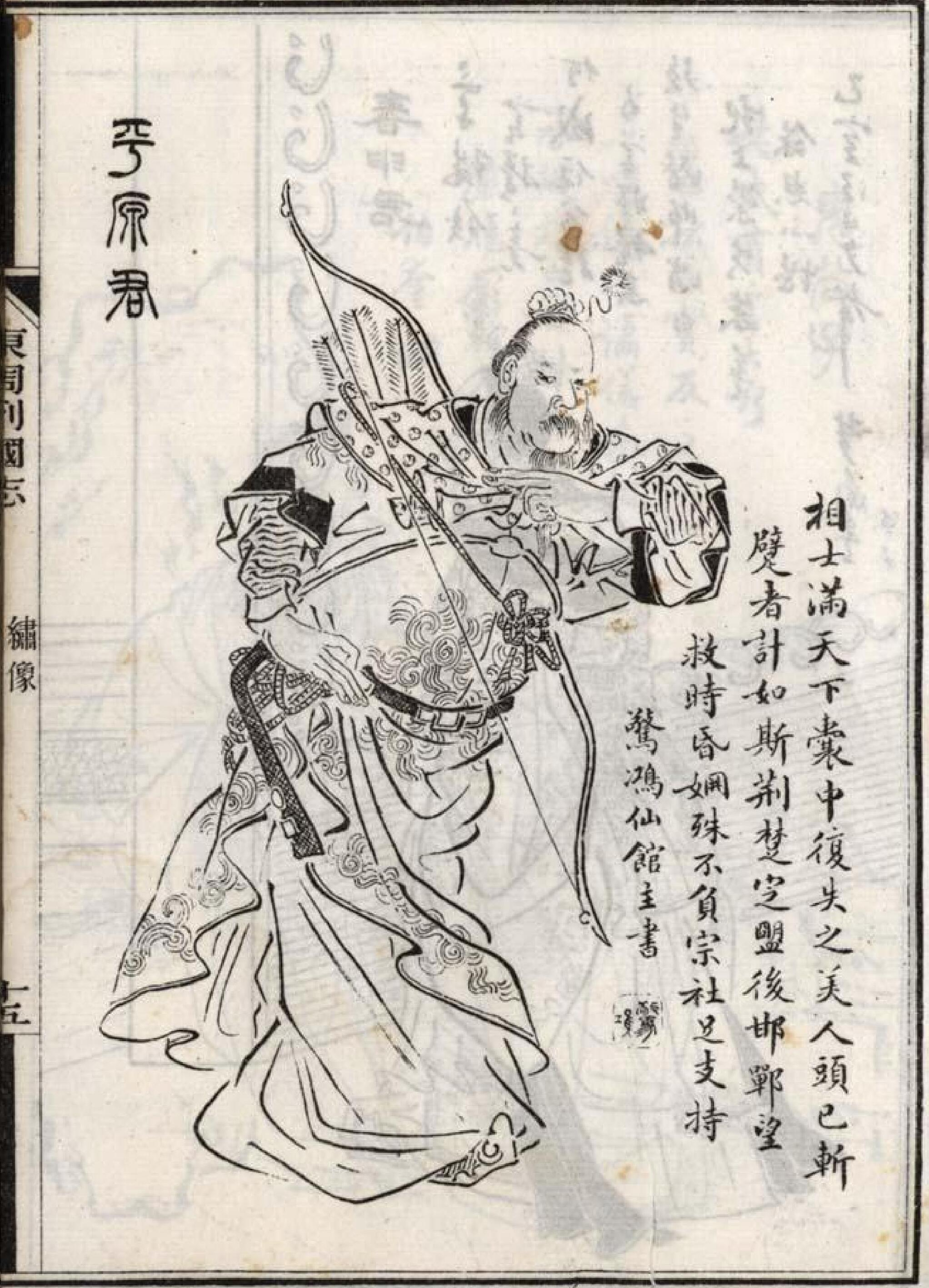
- Lord Pingyuan as depicted in an illustrated edition of Chronicles of the Eastern Zhou Kingdoms (1890)
- Born: c. 308 BC
- Died: 251 BC
- Spouse: Sister of Lord Xinling
Names
- Ancestral name: Ying (嬴); Clan name: Zhao (趙); Given name: Sheng (勝)
- Father: King Wuling of Zhao

Lord Pingyuan (Chinese: 平原君; pinyin: Píngyuán Jūn; c. 308–251 BC), born Zhao Sheng (Chinese: 趙勝), was a prominent nobleman and chancellor of the State of Zhao during the Warring States period of ancient China, and one of the Four Lords of the Warring States. (Note: The other three were Lord Mengchang, Lord Xinling and Lord Chunshen.) He was a son of King Wuling of Zhao, and served as chancellor in the courts of his brother King Huiwen (r. 298–266 BC) and his nephew King Xiaocheng (r. 265–245 BC).

Lord Pingyuan was celebrated for his role in lifting Qin's siege of the Zhao capital Handan, thus saving Zhao from annihilation. However, his chancellorship also saw the crushing defeat of Zhao by Qin at the Battle of Changping, which led to the siege. As with the rest of the Four Lords, his generosity to his retainers is considered a major part of his political and diplomatic accomplishments.

== Biography ==
Zhao Sheng was a son of King Wuling of Zhao, a major reformer who laid the foundations for Zhao's prominence among the warring states. Considered one of the most capable noblemen, Zhao Sheng patronized learning and supported thousands of scholar-retainers.

Sometime after his older brother Zhao He became king in 298 BC (known posthumously as King Huiwen), Zhao Sheng was made chancellor, and served in the capacity until his death in 251 BC, with two notable interruptions, when the chancellorship was appointed to Yue Yi in 285 BC and Tian Dan in 264 BC. When King Huiwen died in 266 BC, Lord Pingyuan continued to serve his successor King Xiaocheng.

=== Promoting Zhao She ===
Zhao She originally served as a tax collector in Zhao, but was met with resistance from the household of Lord Pingyuan, who as nobility refused to pay their land taxes. Instead of backing down before the chancellor, Zhao She executed nine of Lord Pingyuan's retainers as punishment, enraging him. Lord Pingyuan demanded Zhao She's execution, and Zhao She reminded him of the duty of nobles to set an example by following the laws of the state. Lord Pingyuan was impressed and recommended Zhao She to the king. Zhao was put in charge of the state revenues.

=== Siege of Handan ===
Lord Pingyuan is best known for his role in lifting the siege of Handan. After Zhao's catastrophic defeat by the state of Qin at the Battle of Changping, Qin continued to invade Zhao and besieged the Zhao capital Handan in 257 BC. Lord Pingyuan led a secret mission to the state of Chu, and secured the promise of King Kaolie of Chu to come to Zhao's aid, largely owing to the efforts of Lord Pingyuan's retainer Mao Sui.

When he returned to Handan, the situation had become so desperate that people were exchanging their children to eat them. Advised by his retainer Li Tan (Li Tong), Lord Pingyuan distributed all his food and supplies to the troops, and had the women of his harem help in the war effort. He raised a force of 3,000 men who were prepared to die, and charged against the Qin soldiers, who were forced to retreat 30 li (about 10 miles (16 km)). At this time the troops of Wei and Chu arrived, and the combined forces of the three states routed the Qin army and lifted the siege. This was the most celebrated defeat of Qin in the 3rd century BC, and delayed Qin's ultimate conquest of China by three decades. It cemented the reputations of three of the Four Lords of the Warring States: Lord Pingyuan, Lord Xinling of Wei, and Lord Chunshen of Chu. Li Tan died in the battle, and as a recognition of his service, his father was enfeoffed as Marquis of Li.

== Assessment ==
In his book Xunzi, philosopher Xun Kuang, who was present in Handan during the siege, highly praised Lord Pingyuan for his ability "to rescue the state from the greatest calamities and to deliver it from the danger of the greatest injury", calling his conduct "true assistance".

In the Records of the Grand Historian, the great Han dynasty historian Sima Qian criticizes Lord Pingyuan for his role in accepting the gift of Shangdang from the state of Han, which led to the Battle of Changping and the calamitous defeat of Zhao at the hand of Qin. However, historian Qiao Zhou rejects Sima Qian's assessment, and blames King Xiaocheng of Zhao for the defeat.

== Bibliography ==
- Chaliand, Gérard (1994). The Art of War in World History: From Antiquity to the Nuclear Age. University of California Press. ISBN 978-0-520-07964-9.
- Farmer, J. Michael (2008). The Talent of Shu: Qiao Zhou and the Intellectual World of Early Medieval Sichuan. SUNY Press. ISBN 978-0-7914-7164-7.
- Han, Zhaoqi, ed. (2010). "Biographies of Lord Pingyuan and Yu Qing". Shiji 史记 (in Chinese). Beijing: Zhonghua Book Company. ISBN 978-7-101-07272-3.
- Knoblock, John, ed. (1988). Xunzi: A Translation and Study of the Complete Works. Stanford University Press. ISBN 978-0-8047-1451-8.
