= King Hui of Wei =

Chinese ruler of Wei from 369 to 319 BC

King Hui of Wei 魏惠王
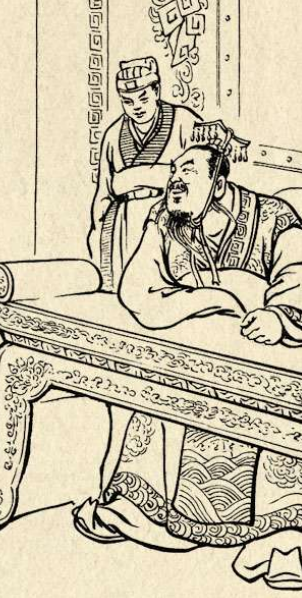

King of Wei
- Reign: 344–319 BC
- Predecessor: New title
- Successor: King Xiang

Marquess of Wei
- Reign: 369–344 BC
- Predecessor: Marquess Wu
- Successor: Crowned as king
- Born: 400 BCE
- Died: 319 BCE
- Issue: Crown Prince Shen; King Xiang of Wei; Prince He
Names
- Ancestral name: Jī (姬); Lineage name: Wèi (魏); Given name: Yīng (罃 or 嬰)
Posthumous name
- King Hui (惠王) or King Wenhui (文惠王) or King Huicheng (惠成王)
- House: Ji
- Dynasty: Wei
- Father: Marquess Wu of Wei

Chinese name
- Chinese: 魏惠王
Transcriptions
Standard Mandarin
- Hanyu Pinyin: Wèi Hùi Wáng
- Bopomofo: ㄨㄟˋ ㄏㄨㄟˋ ㄨㄤˊ
- Wade–Giles: wei^{4} hui^{4} wang^{2}
Wu
- Romanization: ngue^{6} we^{6} waon^{6}
Yue: Cantonese
- Jyutping: ngai^{6} wai^{6} wong^{4}
Middle Chinese
- Middle Chinese: ngjw+jH hwejH hjwang
Old Chinese
- Baxter–Sagart (2014): /*N-qʰuj-s [ɢ]ʷˤi[j]-s ɢʷaŋ/
- Zhengzhang: /*ŋɡuls ɢʷiːds ɢʷaŋ/

King Hui of Liang
- Chinese: 梁惠王
Transcriptions
Standard Mandarin
- Hanyu Pinyin: Liáng Wèi Hùi
- Bopomofo: ㄌㄧㄤˊ ㄏㄨㄟˋ ㄨㄤˊ
- Wade–Giles: liang^{2} hui^{4} wang^{2}
Wu
- Romanization: lian^{6} we^{6} waon^{6}
Yue: Cantonese
- Jyutping: loeng^{4} wai^{6} wong^{4}
Middle Chinese
- Middle Chinese: ljang hwejH hjwang
Old Chinese
- Baxter–Sagart (2014): /*raŋ [ɢ]ʷˤi[j]-s ɢʷaŋ/
- Zhengzhang: /*raŋ ɢʷiːds ɢʷaŋ/

Given name
- Chinese: 嬰 or 罃
Transcriptions
Standard Mandarin
- Hanyu Pinyin: yīng
- Bopomofo: ㄧㄥ
- Wade–Giles: ying^{1}
Yue: Cantonese
- Jyutping: jing^{1} or ang^{1}
Middle Chinese
- Middle Chinese: 'jieng or 'eang
Old Chinese
- Baxter–Sagart (2014): /*ʔeŋ/ or /*[ʔ]ˤreŋ/
- Zhengzhang: /*qeŋ/ or /*qreːŋ/

King Hui of Wei (Chinese: 魏惠王; 400–319 BC), also known as King Hui of Liang (Chinese: 梁惠王), personal name Wei Ying, was a monarch of the Wei state, reigning from 369 BC to 319 BC. He initially ruled as marquess, but later elevated himself to kingship in 344 BC. He was a grandson of Marquess Wen, the founder of the state, and a son of his predecessor, Marquess Wu. He was succeeded by his son, King Xiang.

== Reign ==
King Hui of Wei came to the throne after a war of succession during which Wei was nearly partitioned by the Zhao and Han states. Hui Shi is recorded as having been his Prime Minister in Shuo Yuan, having rushed at the opportunity to serve after his previous, unnamed Prime Minister, had died.

As a ruler, King Hui is notable for four policies:

1. In 361 BC, he moved the capital from Anyi to Daliang to get it out of the reach of the Qin state. Anyi was on the plateau south of the Fen River not far from where the Fen River and Wei River join the Yellow River. Daliang was to the far southeast of Wei near the border with the Song state. Thereafter, the Wei state was briefly called Liang.
2. In 362–359 BC, he made exchanges of territory with Zhao to the north and Han to the south. This gave Wei more rational borders, secured the new capital and gave Wei more control over trade routes.
3. In 361–355 BC, he held several face-to-face meetings with the rulers of the neighboring states.
4. In 344 BC, he promoted the Wei state from a march to a kingdom.

Sima Qian records that Pang Juan, a general of Wei under King Hui, would progressively become jealous of Sun Bin. Pang would frame Sun for treason, wherein King Hui would sentence him to death, but commute it to the removal of his kneecaps after Pang convinced him to stay his hand. Sun Bin would later flee to Qi after feigning insanity upon realising Pang's manipulation. Sun Bin would later lead an attack on Wei during the Battle of Guiling as part of an attempt on Daliang to alleviate pressure on Zhao, who would then injure Pang Juan during an ambush at the Yellow River, leading to his suicide. Wei was left defeated.

=== In Mencius ===
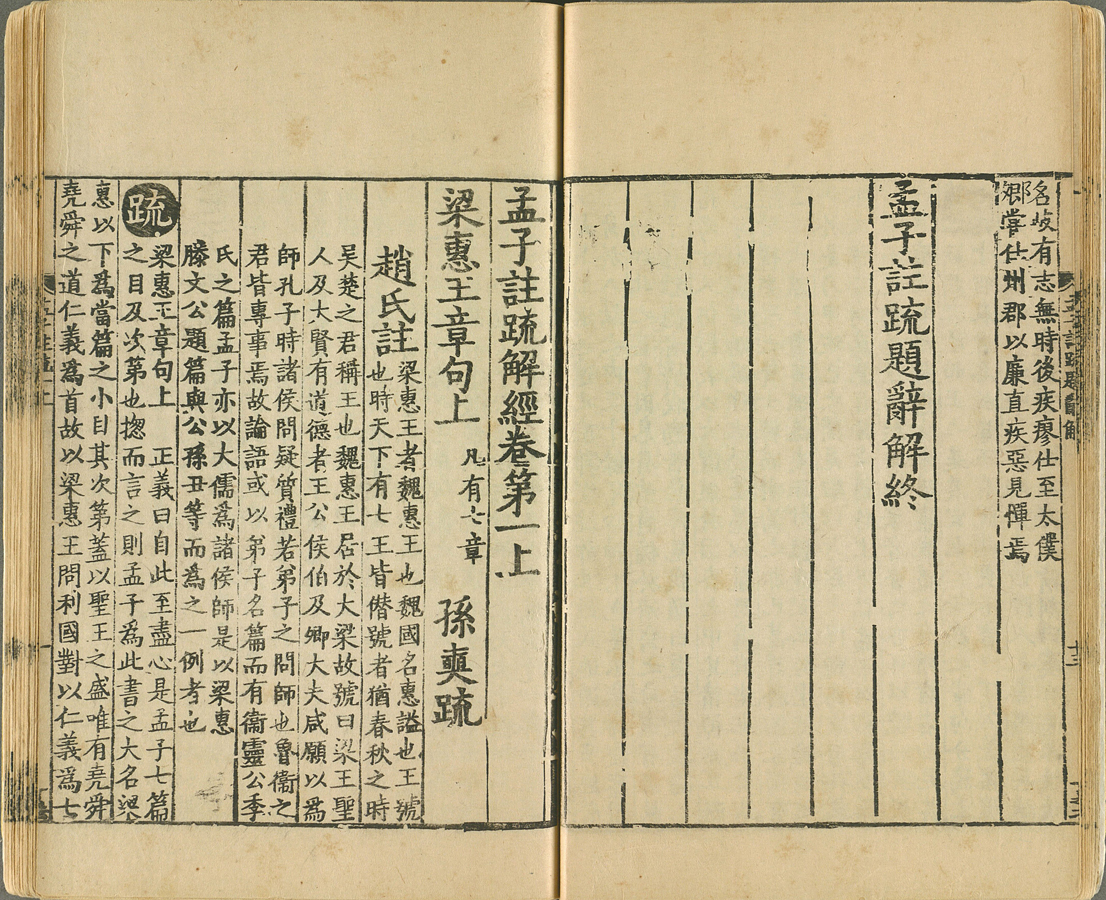
13th-century print of Mencius, with the first King Hui of Liang chapter visible.

During the time in which Wei was called Liang, King Hui conducted several dialogues with the renowned Confucian scholar Mencius. At first, Mencius notably speaks out against King Hui's use of the word "profit," which, according to Sima Qian, was in the presence of Zou Yan and Chunyu Kun, and after several defeats. Mencius later contends with the State of Liang's centralisation of food and wealth, causing widespread famine whilst losing territory to Qi, Qin, and Chu. There is additionally a dialogue regarding why common people take pleasure in watching animals. In the second chapter, Mencius regarded King Hui as "the opposite of benevolent," given his penchant for profit-seeking and warmongering, even sending his own son to losing battles.

It is written in Fengsu Tongyi by Ying Shao that King Hui of Liang appointed Mencius as a high official at some point.

=== In Zhuangzi ===
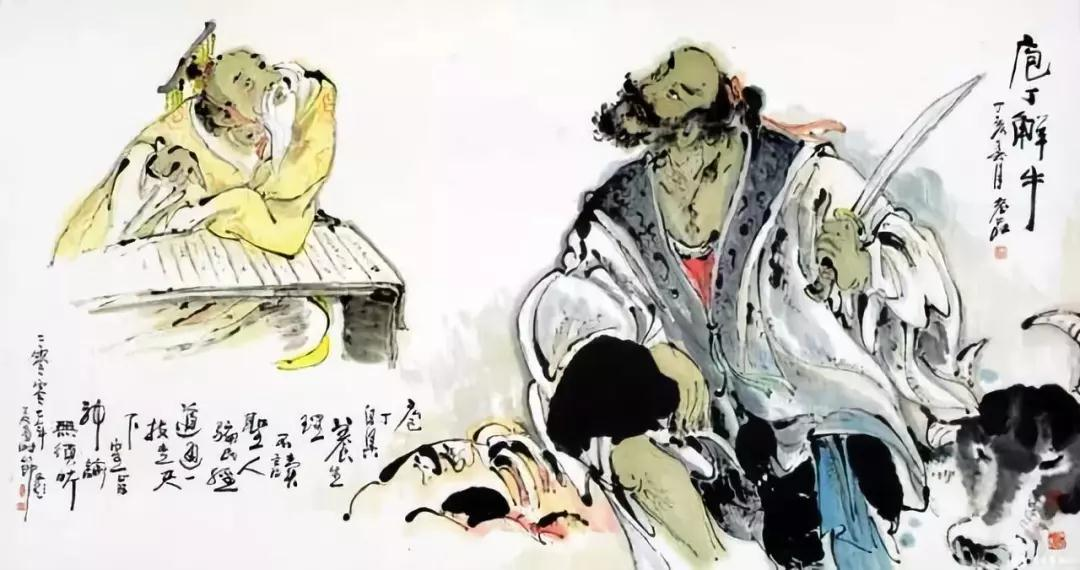
King Hui of Wei observing Butcher Ding.

King Hui of Wei, and his Prime Minister, Hui Shi, appear frequently in Zhuangzi. Among these is within the parable Nourishing the Lord of Life, where he bears witness to the Butcher Ding's use of Wu Wei to effortlessly cut an ox with a 19-year old knife. Hui asks Ding of how he managed to achieve such skill, but is met with the reply that as one's skill approaches the Dao, it goes beyond mere "skill". Sima Qian adds context to this passage, stating that King Hui was a contemporary of Zhuang Zhou himself.

庖丁爲文惠君解牛，手之所觸，肩之所倚，足之所履，膝之所踦，砉然嚮然，奏刀騞然，莫不中音，合於《桑林》之舞，乃中《經首》之會。文惠君曰：「譆，善哉！技蓋至此乎？」庖丁釋刀對曰：「臣之所好者，道也，進乎技矣。始臣之解牛之時，所見无非牛者。三年之後，未嘗見全牛也。方今之時，臣以神遇而不以目視，官知止而神欲行，依乎天理，批大郤，導大窾，因其固然。技經肯綮之未嘗，而況大軱乎？良庖歲更刀，割也；族庖月更刀，折也。今臣之刀十九年矣，所解數千牛矣，而刀刃若新發於硎。彼節者有間，而刀刃者无厚，以无厚入有間，恢恢乎其於遊刃必有餘地矣，是以十九年而刀刃若新發於硎。雖然，每至於族，吾見其難爲，怵然爲戒，視爲止，行爲遟，動刀甚微，謋然已解，如土委地。提刀而立，爲之四顧，爲之躊躇滿志，善刀而藏之。」文惠君曰：「善哉！吾聞庖丁之言，得養生焉。」

His cook was cutting up an ox for the ruler Wen Hui. Whenever he applied his hand, leaned forward with his shoulder, planted his foot, and employed the pressure of his knee, in the audible ripping off of the skin, and slicing operation of the knife, the sounds were all in regular cadence. Movements and sounds proceeded as in the dance of 'the Mulberry Forest' and the blended notes of the King Shou.' The ruler said, 'Ah! Admirable! That your art should have become so perfect!' (Having finished his operation), the cook laid down his knife, and replied to the remark, 'What your servant loves is the method of the Dao, something in advance of any art. When I first began to cut up an ox, I saw nothing but the (entire) carcase. After three years I ceased to see it as a whole. Now I deal with it in a spirit-like manner, and do not look at it with my eyes. The use of my senses is discarded, and my spirit acts as it wills. Observing the natural lines, (my knife) slips through the great crevices and slides through the great cavities, taking advantage of the facilities thus presented. My art avoids the membranous ligatures, and much more the great bones. A good cook changes his knife every year; (it may have been injured) in cutting - an ordinary cook changes his every month - (it may have been) broken. Now my knife has been in use for nineteen years; it has cut up several thousand oxen, and yet its edge is as sharp as if it had newly come from the whetstone. There are the interstices of the joints, and the edge of the knife has no (appreciable) thickness; when that which is so thin enters where the interstice is, how easily it moves along! The blade has more than room enough. Nevertheless, whenever I come to a complicated joint, and see that there will be some difficulty, I proceed anxiously and with caution, not allowing my eyes to wander from the place, and moving my hand slowly. Then by a very slight movement of the knife, the part is quickly separated, and drops like (a clod of) earth to the ground. Then standing up with the knife in my hand, I look all round, and in a leisurely manner, with an air of satisfaction, wipe it clean, and put it in its sheath.' The ruler Wen Hui said, 'Excellent! I have heard the words of my cook, and learned from them the nourishment of (our) life.' -- James Legge translation, 1891.

== Personal life ==
King Hui of Wei is recorded as having been a lover of philosophy and was a contemporary of Daoist philosopher Zhuang Zhou and his dearest friend Hui Shi. So much so, that Hui Shi would go on to be appointed as his Prime Minister. He would personally go on hunts, which is recorded in a policy conflict between himself and King Xuan of Qi in Han shi waizhuan. He bore children, and his lineage was said to have lasted for five generations.

== Death and funeral ==
King Hui's death is recorded in Records of the Grand Historian as having occurred in the first year of Marquess Su of Zhao's reign, somewhere around 319-326 BCE. The funeral process is recorded in its own chapter in Zhan Guo Ce:

魏惠王死，葬有日矣。天大雨雪，至於牛目，壞城郭，且為棧道而葬。群臣多諫太子者，曰：「雪甚如此而喪行，民必甚病之。官費又恐不給，請弛期更日。」太子曰：「為人子，而以民勞與官費用之故，而不行先生之桑，不義也。子勿復言。」
King Hui of Wei died, and his burial was scheduled. There was a large snowstorm, reaching Niumu; moreover, city walls were damaged and a makeshift road needed to be built. A group of ministers remonstrated with Crown Prince Xiang of Wei, stating: "With such heavy snow, the people will suffer greatly at the funeral procession. Furthermore, the government funds may not be sufficient. We request that the date be postponed." He responded: "As a prince, it would be unjust for me to neglect my father's funeral for the sake of the people's hardship and government expenses. Do not speak of this again."

群臣皆不敢言，而以告犀首。犀首曰：「吾未有以言之也，是其唯惠公乎！請告惠公。」
The group of ministers did not dare respond, and chose to inform Xi Shou. He responded: "I have yet to think of words for this; it is a matter for Duke Hui! Please go to Duke Hui.

惠公曰：「諾。」駕而見太子曰：「葬有日矣。」太子曰：「然。」惠公曰：「昔王季歷葬於楚山之尾，灓水嚙其墓，見棺之前和。文王曰：『嘻！先君必欲一見群臣百姓也夫，故使灓水見之。』於是出而為之張於朝，百姓皆見之，三日而後更葬。此文王之義也。今葬有日矣，而雪甚，及牛目，難以行，太子為及日之故，得毋嫌於欲亟葬乎？愿太子更日。先王必欲少留而扶社稷、安黔首也，故使雪甚。因弛期而更為日，此文王之義也。若此而弗為，意者羞法文王乎？」太子曰：「甚善。敬弛期，更擇日。」
Duke Hui responded to the minister's concerns: "I concur." He then went to see the Crown Prince and said, "Has the burial date has been set, milord?" The Crown Prince said, "Indeed." Duke Hui said, "Long ago, King Ji Li was buried at the end of Mount Chu. The Yan River eroded his tomb, revealing the coffin. King Wen said, 'Alas! My late lord must have wanted to see his ministers and people one last time, so he let the Yan River see it.' So he went out and made a display in the court, and all the people saw it. He then reburied the coffin three days later. This is the righteousness of King Wen. Now, the burial date may have been set, but the snow is so heavy that it reaches the Niumu, making it difficult to travel. For the sake of the date, Your Highness, could you be tempted to hasten the burial? I implore milord to change the date. My late lord must have wanted to linger a little longer to support the state and bring peace to the people, so he made the snow so heavy. He then postponed the date and changed it. This is the righteousness of King Wen. If you do not do this, would you be ashamed to follow the example of King Wen?" The Crown Prince said, "Very well. I will respectfully postpone the date and choose a new one."

惠子非徒行其說也，又令魏太子未葬其先王而因又說文王之義。說文王之義以示天下，豈小功也哉！
Master Hui not only followed his words, but also instructed Crown Prince Xiang of Wei to expound on the principles of King Wen before burying his late king. To expound on the principles of King Wen to demonstrate them to the world—this was no small feat!

== Bibliography ==
- Lewis, Mark Edward (1999). "Calendar and Chronology". In Loewe, Michael; Shaughnessy, Edward L. (eds.). The Cambridge history of ancient China : from the origins of civilization to 221 B.C.. Cambridge, UK: Cambridge University Press. pp. 587–651. ISBN 0-521-47030-7. OCLC 37361770.
- Shaughnessy, Edward L. (1999). "Calendar and Chronology". In Loewe, Michael; Shaughnessy, Edward L. (eds.). The Cambridge history of ancient China : from the origins of civilization to 221 B.C.. Cambridge, UK: Cambridge University Press. pp. 19–30. ISBN 0-521-47030-7. OCLC 37361770.
