= King Anxi of Wei =

King Anxi of Wei 魏安僖王

King of Wei
- Reign: 276–243 BC
- Predecessor: King Zhao
- Successor: King Jingmin
- Died: 243 BC
- Issue: King Jingmin
Names
- Ancestral name: Jī (姬); Lineage name: Wèi (魏); Given name: Yǔ (圉)
Posthumous name
- King Anxi (安僖王 or 安禧王 or 安釐王 (Note: Sima Qian, the author of the Records of the Grand Historian, used the homophonous character 釐 to circumvent the naming taboo of his grandfather, whose given name was 僖.))
- House: Ji
- Dynasty: Wei
- Father: King Zhao of Wei

King Anxi of Wei (died 243 BC), personal name Wei Yu (Chinese: 魏圉), was king of the Wei state from 276 BC to 243 BC.

He was the son of King Zhao and the older brother of Lord Xinling (Wei Wuji). In 275 BC, after a Han general fled to the Wei capital Daliang, King Anxi began a war against Qin in an alliance with Qi. Qin forces under chancellor Wei Ran and general Bai Qi captured 4 cities, besieged Daliang and killed 40,000 people. In 273 BC, with the assistance of Lord Mengchang of Qi, he began another war in an alliance with Zhao. The war ended with the deaths of 130,000 people. In 257 BC, he assisted Zhao when its capital Handan was besieged by Qin forces, at the request of Lord Pingyuan of Zhao, who was married his and Lord Xinling‘s sister.

Some scholars have speculated that Anxi is the unnamed king of Wei in the story of Lord Longyang recorded in the Strategies of the Warring States.

== Hagiography ==
In King Anxi's 1st Year, 276 BC, Qin's Lord of Wu'an (武安君) Bai Qi (白起) attacked Wei, capturing 2 cities. In his 2nd Year, 275 BC, Qin chancellor Marquis Rang attacked Wei, capturing 2 cities, the Qin army marched to the capital Daliang, Han sent general Bao Yuan (暴鳶) to rescue, Qin defeated the Han army, beheading 40,000 troops, Bao Yuan then fled to Kaifeng (啟封, alternate name for Daliang, the Wei capital), Wei ceded 8 cities for peace, but Marquis Rang continued his attack, sieging Daliang, Wei ceded Wen for peace. In his 3rd Year, 274 BC, Qin attacked Wei, beheading 40,000, and capturing 4 cities. In his 5th Year, 272 BC, Wei, together with Han, Qin and Chu, attacked Yan. In his 9th Year, 268 BC, Qin adopted Fan Ju's proposed military strategy, sending Guan (綰) to attack and capture Wei's Huai (懷). In his 10 year, 267 BC, Crown price Dao of Qin died while hostage in Wei. In his 11th Year, Qin attacked Wei's Qiqiu (郪丘). In his 23rd Year, 254 BC, Qin general Jiao (摎) attacked Wei, capturing Wucheng (吳城). In his 29th year, 248 BC, Qin general Meng Ao (蒙驁) attacked Wei, seizing Gaodu and Ji. In 30th Year, Lord Xinling of Wei lead troops of 5 states to attack Qin, defeating Qin general Meng Ao forcing him to withdraw. In his 32nd Year, 245 BC, Qin Biao Gong (麃公) attacked Wei's Juan (卷), beheading 30,000. King Anxi died in his 34th Year, 243 BC and was succeeded by his son King Jingmin.

== Bibliography ==
- Shiji, vol. 44
