= Wei Wang (table tennis) =

American table tennis player

Personal information
- Born: 21 March 1961 (age 65) China

Sport
- Sport: Table tennis
Medal record
Women's table tennis
Representing United States
Pan American Games
Silver medal – second place	1995 Mar del Plata	Team
Bronze medal – third place	1995 Mar del Plata	Doubles

Wei Wang (Chinese: 王伟; pinyin: Wáng Wěi, born 21 March 1961) is a Chinese-born American table tennis player who represented the United States at the 1996 Summer Olympics. She competed in women's doubles with Lily Yip, who was also born in China. She was also a bronze medalist at the 1995 Pan American Games, partnering with Vietnamese-born Tawny Banh.

== Personal life ==
Wei married Diego Schaaf in March 1989. They first met in 1987 at the Orange Coast College Table Tennis Club in Costa Mesa, California, where she was giving lessons.
