= Wei Wang (computer scientist) =

Chinese computer scientist

Wei Wang is a Chinese-born American computer scientist. She is the Leonard Kleinrock Chair Professor in Computer Science and Computational Medicine at University of California, Los Angeles and the director of the Scalable Analytics Institute (ScAi). Her research specializes in big data analytics and modeling, database systems, natural language processing, bioinformatics and computational biology, and computational medicine.

== Education ==
Wei Wang received her undergraduate training in computer science at the Nankai University from 1990 to 1993. She then went on to receive her MS in Systems Science from the Binghamton University in 1995 and PhD in computer science from the University of California, Los Angeles (UCLA) in 1999. She was a research staff member at the IBM Watson Research Center and a professor at the University of North Carolina at Chapel Hill, before returning to UCLA in 2012.

== Awards and honors ==
Wang received the IBM Invention Achievement Awards in 2000 and 2001. She was also the recipient of a UNC Junior Faculty Development Award in 2003 and an NSF Faculty Early Career Development (CAREER) Award in 2005. She was named a Microsoft Research New Faculty Fellow in 2005 and honored with the 2007 Phillip and Ruth Hettleman Prize for Artistic and Scholarly Achievement at UNC. In addition, she was recognized with an IEEE ICDM Outstanding Service Award in 2012, an Okawa Foundation Research Award in 2013, and an ACM SIGKDD Service Award in 2016. She is elected ACM Fellow in 2020.

== Selected publications ==
Her works include:

- RIN: Reformulation Inference Network for Context-Aware Query Suggestion, by Jyun-Yu Jiang and Wei Wang, Proceedings of the 27th ACM Conference on Information and Knowledge Management (CIKM), pp. 197–206, 2018.
- NetWalk: A Flexible Deep Embedding Approach for Anomaly Detection in Dynamic Networks, by Wenchao Yu, Wei Cheng, Charu Aggarwal, Kai Zhang, Haifeng Chen, and Wei Wang, Proceedings of the 24th ACM SIGKDD International Conference on Knowledge Discovery and Data Mining(SIGKDD), pp. 2672–2681, 2018.
- Learning Deep Network Representations with Adversarially Regularized Autoencoders, by Wenchao Yu, Cheng Zheng, Wei Cheng, Charu Aggarwal, Dongjin Song, Bo Zong, Haifeng Chen, and Wei Wang, Proceedings of the 24th ACM SIGKDD International Conference on Knowledge Discovery and Data Mining(SIGKDD), pp. 2663–2671, 2018.
- Identifying Users behind Shared Accounts in Online Streaming Services, by Jyun-Yu Jiang, Cheng-Te Li, Yian Chen and Wei Wang, Proceedings of the 41st International ACM SIGIR Conference on Research and Development in Information Retrieval (SIGIR), pp. 65–74, 2018.
- Modeling Co-Evolution Across Multiple Networks, Wenchao Yu, Charu Aggarwal, and Wei Wang, Proceedings of the 18th SIAM International Conference on Data Mining (SDM), pp. 675–683, 2018.
- Translating literature into causal graphs: toward automated experiment selection, by Nicholas Matiasz, Justin Wood, Wei Wang, Alcino Silva, William Hsu, Proceedings of the IEEE International Conference on Bioinformatics and Biomedicine (BIBM), pp. 573–576, 2017.
