= Jia of Wei =

Chinese ruler, died c. 225 BC

Wei Jia 魏假

King of Wei
- Reign: 227–225 BCE
- Predecessor: King Jingmin
- Died: 225 BCE?
Names
- Ancestral name: Jī (姬); Lineage name: Wèi (魏); Given name: Jiǎ (假)
- House: Ji
- Dynasty: Wei
- Father: King Jingmin of Wei

Wei Jia, commonly known as "Jia, King of Wei" (Chinese: 魏王假; died 225 BC?), was the last ruler of the Wei state during the waning days of the Warring States period of Chinese history. He ruled the kingdom between 227 BC and 225 BC.

Jia, the son of King Jingmin, ascended to the throne after his father's death. In 225 BC, a Qin army led by Wang Ben invaded Wei. Wen Ben directed the waters from the Yellow River and the Hong Canal (鴻溝) to inundate the capital of Wei, Daliang (present-day Kaifeng). Three months later, the city wall was destroyed, and Jia had to surrender. His fate was not mentioned in the Records of the Grand Historian. However, according to Biographies of Exemplary Women and Zizhi Tongjian, he was executed by the Qin army.
