= King Xiang of Wei =

King of Wei from 318 BC to 296 BC

King Xiang of Wei 魏襄王

King of Wei
- Reign: 318–296 BC
- Predecessor: King Hui
- Successor: King Zhao
- Died: 296 BC
Names
- Ancestral name: Jī (姬); Lineage name: Wèi (魏); Given name: Sì (嗣)
Posthumous name
- King Xiang (襄王)
- House: Ji
- Dynasty: Wei
- Father: King Hui of Wei

King Xiang of Wei (Chinese: 魏襄王; died 296 BC), personal name Wei Si (Chinese: 魏嗣), was king of the Wei state from 318 BC to 296 BC. He was the son of King Hui. In 318 BC, at the suggestion of the Wei minister Gongsun Yan, he entered into an alliance against the Qin state created by King Huai of Chu which also included the states of Zhao, Han and Yan. Chu then betrayed this alliance.

In 317 BC, at the suggestion of chancellor Zhang Yi, King Xiang entered into an alliance with Qin. To punish Chu for its betrayal of the five-state alliance, King Xiang sent an army in 312 BC to attack the city of Dengcheng in Chu (modern-day Shangshui County, Zhoukou, Henan Province).

Wei itself was attacked by the Qi state in 310 BC, and King Xiang met King Wu of Qin at Linjin (modern-day Linyi County, Yuncheng, Shanxi Province). In 308 BC, the two kings met again at Yingcheng (modern-day part of Xiaogan, Hubei) to plan an attack on Han.

In 306 BC, after the death of King Wu of Qin, Wei's alliance with Qin broke down, and Qin invaded, attacking and occupying the city of Puban. Qin chancellor Gan Mao defected to Wei and the invading forces were withdrawn. In 303 BC, Qin took advantage of Wei's alliance with Qi and Han against Chu to launch a second invasion.

In 302 BC, relations between Wei and Qin normalized, and King Xiang met King Zhaoxiang of Qin and Han Ying (crown prince of Han) at Linjin, in which Qin agreed to return Puban. This allowed alliance of Wei, Han and Qi in inflict a major defeat on Chu in 301 BC. In 299 BC, King Xiang met with King Min of Qi and King Wuling of Zhao at Han's capital Xinzheng to propose a four-state alliance of Qi, Han, Wei and Zhao against Qin.

It was in King Xiang's tomb that the Bamboo Annals were discovered in AD 279, an event referred to as the Jizhong discovery.
