= King Kaolie of Chu =

King of Chinese state of Chu from 262 to 238 BC

King Kaolie of Chu 楚考烈王

King of Chu
- Reign: 262–238 BC
- Predecessor: King Qingxiang
- Successor: King You
- Died: 238 BC
- Issue: King You; Xiong Fuchu; King Ai; Xiong Qi
Names
- Ancestral name: Mǐ (羋); Lineage name: Xióng (熊); Given name: Wán (完) or Yuán (元)
Posthumous name
- King Kaolie (考烈王)
- House: Mi
- Dynasty: Chu
- Father: King Qingxiang

King Kaolie of Chu (Chinese: 楚考烈王; pinyin: Chǔ Kǎoliè Wáng), personal name Xiong Wan, was the king of the Chu state from 262 BC to 238 BC.

King Kaolie succeeded his father, King Qingxiang, who died in 263 BC. In 249 BC, King Kaolie invaded and annexed the Lu state.

King Kaolie died in 238 BC after 25 years of reign, and was succeeded by his son, King You.

King Kaolie of Chu House of Mi Died: 238 BC
Regnal titles
| Preceded by King Qingxiang of Chu | King of Chu; 262–238 BC | Succeeded by King You of Chu |
