= King Qingxiang of Chu =

King of Chinese state of Chu from 298 to 263 BC

King Qingxiang of Chu 楚頃襄王

King of Chu
- Reign: 298–263 BC
- Predecessor: King Huai
- Successor: King Kaolie
- Born: 329 BC
- Died: 263 BC
- Issue: King Kaolie
Names
- Ancestral name: Mǐ (羋); Lineage name: Xióng (熊); Given name: Héng (橫)
Posthumous name
- King Qingxiang (頃襄王) or King Zhuang (莊王)
- House: Mi
- Dynasty: Chu
- Father: King Huai
- Mother: Zheng Xiu (鄭袖)

King Qingxiang of Chu (Chinese: 楚頃襄王; pinyin: Chǔ Qǐngxiāng Wáng), personal name Xiong Heng, was from 298 BC to 263 BC the king of the Chu state.

King Qingxiang's father, King Huai, was held hostage in 299 BC by King Zhao of Qin when he went to the Qin state for negotiation. King Qingxiang then ascended the Chu throne. King Huai managed to escape but was recaptured by Qin. Three years later he died in captivity.

King Qingxiang died in 263 BC and was succeeded by his son, King Kaolie.

== In fiction and popular culture ==
- Portrayed by Su Hang in The Legend of Mi Yue (2015)

King Qingxiang of Chu House of Mi Died: 263 BC
Regnal titles
Preceded by King Huai of Chu	King of Chu; 298–263 BC	Succeeded by King Kaolie of Chu
