= King Ai of Chu =

King of Chinese state of Chu during 228 BC

King Ai of Chu 楚哀王

King of Chu
- Reign: 228 BC
- Predecessor: King You
- Successor: Xiong Fuchu
- Died: 228 BC
Names
- Ancestral name: Mǐ (羋); Lineage name: Xióng (熊); Given name: Yóu (猶)
Posthumous name
- King Ai (哀王)
- House: Mi
- Dynasty: Chu
- Father: King Kaolie
- Mother: Queen Li (李后)

King Ai of Chu (Chinese: 楚哀王; pinyin: Chǔ Āi Wáng), personal name Xiong You (Chinese: 熊猶), was a king of Chu state, reigning briefly in 228 BC. He was a son of King Kaolie and full younger brother of King You, whom he succeeded to the throne.

King Ai was murdered only two months after becoming the ruler by the supporters of his elder half-brother, Xiong Fuchu, who then took over the throne.

King Ai of Chu House of Mi Died: 228 BC
Regnal titles
Preceded by King You of Chu	King of Chu; 228 BC	Succeeded by Fuchu
