= Wei (state) =

Ancient Chinese state during the Warring States period

Wei 魏 *N-qʰuj-s
- 403–225 BC
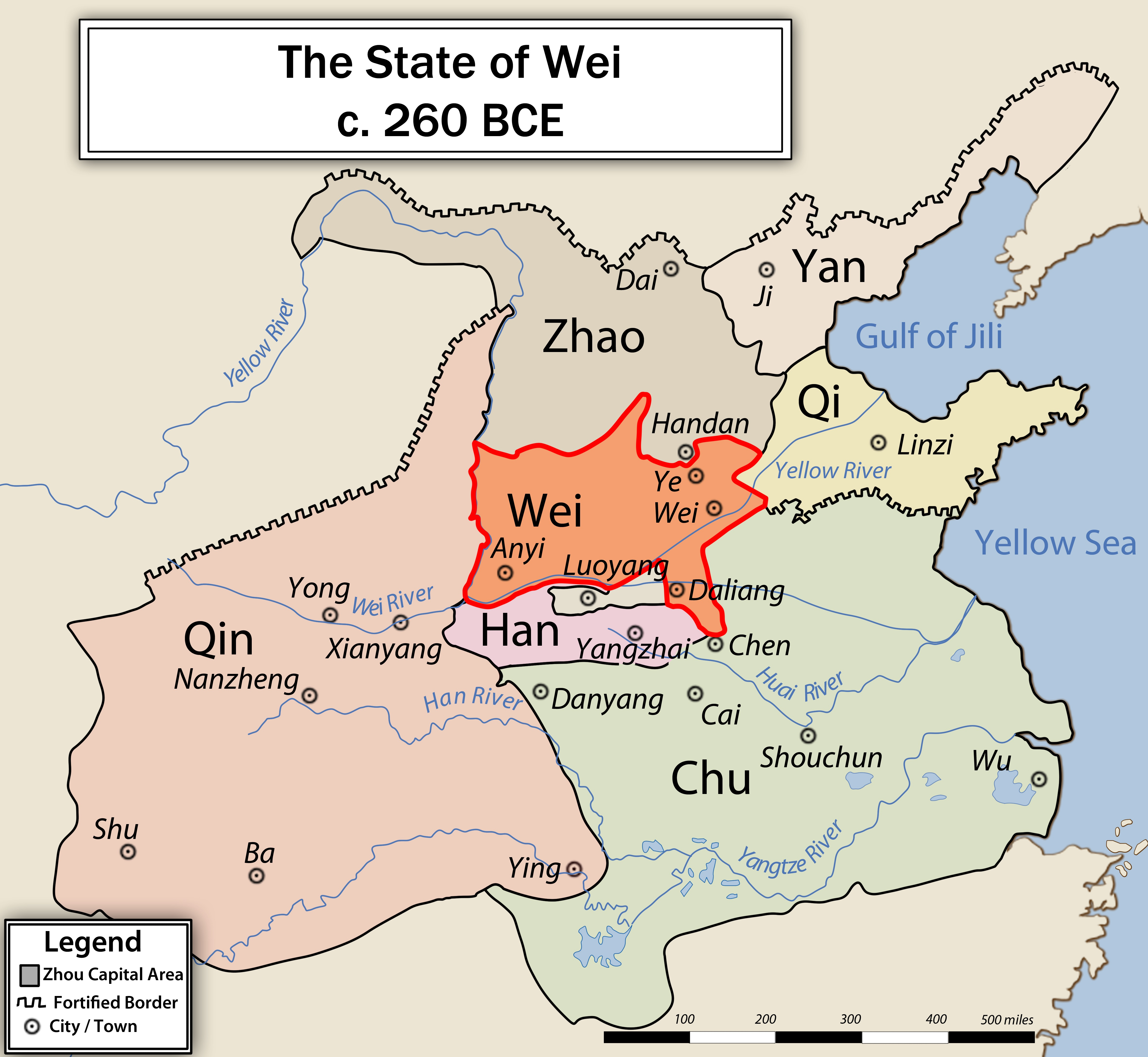
- Status: Marquessate; Kingdom (after 344 BC)
- Capital: Anyi (安邑); Daliang (大梁; from 361 BC)
- Common languages: Old Chinese
- Historical era: Warring States period
  - Partition of Jin: 403
  - Conquered by Qin: 225 BC
- Currency: Spade money; Other ancient Chinese coinage
Preceded by	Succeeded by
Jin (Chinese state)	Qin (state)
- Today part of: People's Republic of China

Wei
- "Wei" in seal script (top) and regular Chinese (bottom) characters
- Chinese: 魏
Transcriptions
Standard Mandarin
- Hanyu Pinyin: Wèi
- Gwoyeu Romatzyh: Wey
- Wade–Giles: Wei^{4}
- IPA: [wêɪ]
Yue: Cantonese
- Yale Romanization: Ngaih
- Jyutping: Ngai^{6}
- IPA: [ŋɐj˨]
Southern Min
- Hokkien POJ: Guī
Old Chinese
- Baxter–Sagart (2014): *N-qʰuj-s

Wei (/weɪ/; Chinese: 魏; pinyin: Wèi) was one of the seven major states during the Warring States period of ancient China. It was created from the three-way Partition of Jin, together with Han and Zhao. Its territory lay between the states of Qin and Qi and included parts of modern-day Henan, Hebei, Shanxi, and Shandong. After its capital was moved from Anyi to Daliang (present-day Kaifeng) during the reign of King Hui, Wei was also called Liang (Chinese: 梁; pinyin: Liáng).

It should not to be confused with the smaller central Wey state 衞, which is still sometimes only differentiated by its Chinese character.

== History ==
=== Foundation ===
Surviving sources trace the ruling house of Wei to the Zhou royalty: Gao, Duke of Bi (畢公高), was a son of King Wen of Zhou. His descendants took their surname, Bi, from his fief. Bi Wan (畢萬), a descendant of the duke, served the Jin, where he became a courtier of Duke Xian's. After a successful military expedition, Bi Wan was granted the fief of Wei (in present-day Ruicheng County, Shanxi), from which his own descendants then founded the house of Wei.

=== Spring and Autumn period ===
Jin's political structure was drastically changed after the slaughter of its ruling dynasty during and after the Li Ji Unrest. Afterwards, "Jin ha[d] no princely house" (晉無公卿) and its political power diffused into extended relations of the ruling family, including the Wei. They became largely independent by the middle of the fifth century.

In the last years of the Spring and Autumn period, the founders of Wei, Zhao, and Han joined to attack and kill the dominant house of Zhi (知) in 453 BCE, resulting in the partition of Jin. Following the partition, the three positioned themselves as heirs to Jin's grandeur, acting as hegemonic powers. King Weilie of Zhou finally legitimized the situation in 403 BCE, when he elevated the three houses' heads to the rank of marquess (Chinese: 侯; pinyin: hóu).

=== Warring States Period ===
The state of Wei approached its apogee in the 360's BCE, following the reigns of its first two rulers, Marquess Wen of Wei and Marquess Wu of Wei. The third ruler, King Hui of Wei (reign 369–319 BC), declared himself an independent sovereign and concentrated on economic developments, including irrigation projects at the Yellow River and adoption of Legalist reforms proposed by Li Kui (Chinese: 李悝, c. 459 – c. 395 BCE).

Hui felt that Qin in the west was weak and their land a barren waste. He focused on conquering the well-settled eastern lands which were richer in known resources, but a series of battles including the battle of Maling in 341 BCE checked Wei's ambitions while Qin's expansion went largely unimpeded, boosting its economy and military strength.

=== Defeat ===
Wei eventually lost the western Hexi (河西) region, a strategic area of pastoral land on the west bank of the Yellow River in now Shaanxi, to Qin. Thereafter, it remained continuously at war with Qin, requiring the capital to be moved from Anyi to Daliang. Wei surrendered to Qin in 225 BCE, after the Qin general Wang Ben diverted the Yellow River into Daliang, destroying the capital in a flood.

== Rulers ==
1. Marquess Wen of Wei, personal name Si (斯) or Du (都) (445–396 BCE)
2. Marquess Wu of Wei, personal name Ji (擊), son of Marquess Wen (396–370 BCE)
3. King Hui of Wei, personal name Ying (罃), son of Marquess Wu (370–319 BCE)
4. King Xiang of Wei (魏襄王), personal name Si (嗣) or He (赫), son of King Hui (319–296 BCE)
5. King Zhao of Wei (魏昭王), personal name Chi (遫), son of King Xiang (296–277 BCE)
6. King Anxi of Wei (魏安釐王), personal name Yu (圉), son of King Zhao (277–243 BCE)
7. King Jingmin of Wei (魏景湣王), personal name Zeng (增) or Wu (午), son of King Anxi (243–228 BCE)
8. King Jia (魏王假), personal name Jia (假), son of King Jingmin (228–225 BCE)

According to Sima Qian's Records of the Grand Historian written in the first century BCE, the list of rulers is slightly different: King Hui died in 335 BCE and was succeeded by his son King Xiang in 334 BCE. King Xiang died in 319 BCE and was succeeded by his son King Ai (哀王), who died in 296 BCE and was succeeded by his son King Zhao. However, the majority of scholars and commentators believe that King Ai, whose personal name is not recorded, never existed. It seems that Sima Qian assigned the second part of the reign of King Hui (starting in 334 BCE, on which date Marquess Hui probably proclaimed himself King) to his son King Xiang and added King Ai to fill in the gap between 319 and 296 BCE. On the other hand, a minority of scholars believe King Ai did indeed exist.

== Family tree of Wei rulers ==
Wei state family tree

Bi Wan 畢萬
Mang Ji 芒季
Wei Chou 魏犨; Viscount Wu of Wei 魏武子
Wei Ke 魏顆 令狐氏	Wèi Qí 魏錡 呂氏 ?–575	Viscount Dao of Wei 魏悼子
Wèi Jié 魏頡 令狐文子 ?–570	Wei Xiang 魏相 呂宣子 ?–622	Wei Jiang 魏絳; Viscount Zhao of Wei 魏昭子
Wei Shu 魏舒; Viscount Xian of Wei 魏獻子; 565–509 BC
Wei Qu 魏取; Viscount Jian of Wei 魏簡子	Wèi Wù 魏戊
Wei Chi 魏侈; Viscount Xiang of Wei 魏襄子
Wei Ju 魏駒; Viscount Huan of Wei 魏桓子 ?–446 BC
^{(1)}Wei Si 魏斯; Wen of Wei 魏文侯; Marquess of Wei ?–424–396 BC	Wei Cheng 魏成
^{(2)}Wei Ji 魏擊; Wu of Wei 魏武侯; Marquess of Wei ?–396–370 BC	少子摯
^{(3)}Wei Ying 魏罃; Hui of Wei 魏惠王; King of Wei; 400–370–319 BC	魏緩
Crown Prince Shen 太子申	^{(4)}Wei He 魏赫; Xiang of Wei 魏襄王; King of Wei ?–319–296 BC	Prince Gao 公子高
Crown Prince Zheng 太子政	^{(5)}Wei Chi 魏遫; Zhao of Wei 魏昭王; King of Wei ?–296–277 BC
^{(6)}Wei Yu 魏於; Anxi of Wei 魏安釐王; King of Wei ?–277–243 BC	Wei Wuji 魏無忌; Lord Xinling 信陵君 ?–243 BC
^{(7)}Wei Zeng 魏增; Jingmin of Wei 魏景湣王; King of Wei ?–243–228 BC
^{(8)}Wei Jia 魏假; Jia of Wei 魏王假; King of Wei ?–228–225 BC

=== Notable people ===
- Li Kui, a Legalist philosopher and chancellor
- Yue Yang, ancestor of Yue Yi and prime minister of Zhongshan
- Pang Juan, a successful general who was defeated by Lord Mengchang of Qi and Sun Bin at the battle of Maling
- Hui Shi, a prime minister and also correspondent with Zhuang Zhou

== Legacy ==
=== Chinese legend ===
According to the Records of the Warring States, a king of Wei had a lover named Lord Longyang, with whom he enjoyed fishing. One day, Longyang began to weep. When questioned, Longyang said he saw his own future in how he had treated a fish. Happy to have the catch at first, Longyang had wanted to throw it back when he caught a better fish. He wept, "I am also a previously-caught fish! I will also be thrown back!" To show his fidelity to Longyang, the king declared that, "Anyone who dares to speak of other beauties will be executed along with his entire family".

=== Chinese astronomy ===
In traditional Chinese astronomy, Wei is represented by one star in the "Twelve States" asterism of the "Girl" lunar mansion of the "Black Turtle" symbol and other star in the "Left Wall" of the "Heavenly Market" enclosure. Sources differ, however, in whether those two stars are (respectively) 33 Capricorni and Delta Herculis or whether they are Chi Capricorni and Phi Capricorni.

== See also ==
- Liang (state), the earlier state of that name
- Liang (realm), the continuation of the title in later dynasties
  - Liang (Han dynasty kingdom), the Han dynasty kingdom established on the territories of Wei
