= Duke Mu of Chen =

Duke Mu of Chen 陳穆公

17th ruler of Chen
- Reign: 647–632 BC
- Predecessor: Duke Xuan of Chen
- Successor: Duke Gong of Chen
- Born: 672 BC
- Died: 632 BC
- Issue: Duke Gong of Chen
Names
- Gui Kuan (媯款)
Posthumous name
- Duke Mu (穆公)
- House: Gui
- Dynasty: Chen
- Father: Duke Xuan of Chen

Duke Mu of Chen (Chinese: 陳穆公; pinyin: Chén Mù Gōng; born 672 BC, reigned 647 BC – died 632 BC), personal name Gui Kuan, was a duke of the Chen state.

Duke Mu was born in 672 BC to the favourite concubine of Duke Xuan. Duke Xuan's original heir apparent was Crown Prince Yukou, but after Duke Mu was born, he killed Yukou and made Kuan his new heir apparent. Yukou was close to Chen Wan (陳完), the son of Duke Li. Afraid that his life was also in danger, Chen Wan fled to the Qi state where he established the Chen (later known as Tian) clan. The Chen clan of Qi would grow increasingly powerful over the centuries, and eventually usurped the Qi throne.

In 653 BC, Prince Kuan represented Chen at a conference at Ningmu in the State of Lu, and made an alliance with Duke Huan of Qi, Duke Xi of Lu, Duke Huan of Song, and Crown Prince Hua of Zheng. After the death of King Hui of Zhou, Prince Kuan attended another conference in early 652 BC to discuss the succession of the Zhou court.

Duke Xuan reigned for 45 years and died in 648 BC. Kuan succeeded his father as ruler of Chen, to be known as Duke Mu. Duke Mu reigned for 16 years and died in 632 BC. He was succeeded by his son Shuo, to be known as Duke Gong of Chen.

== Bibliography ==
- Han, Zhaoqi, ed. (2010). "Houses of Chen and Qi". Shiji 史记 (in Chinese). Beijing: Zhonghua Book Company. ISBN 978-7-101-07272-3.
- Yang, Bojun, ed. (2009). 春秋左传注 [Annotated Chunqiu Zuozhuan] (in Chinese) (3rd revised ed.). Beijing: Zhonghua Book Company. ISBN 978-7-101-07074-3.
