= Duke Wen of Chen =

Ruler of Chen from 754 to 745 BC

Duke Wen of Chen 陳文公

11th ruler of Chen
- Reign: 754–745 BC
- Predecessor: Duke Ping of Chen
- Successor: Duke Huan of Chen
- Died: 745 BC
- Issue: Duke Huan of Chen; Chen Tuo
Names
- Gui Yu (媯圉)
Posthumous name
- Duke Wen (文公)
- House: Gui
- Dynasty: Chen
- Father: Duke Ping of Chen

Duke Wen of Chen (Chinese: 陳文公; pinyin: Chén Wén Gōng; reigned 754 BC – died 745 BC), personal name Gui Yu, was a monarch of the Chen state.

Duke Wen succeeded his father Duke Ping, who died in 755 BC. He reigned for 10 years and died in 745 BC. He was succeeded by his son, Bao (Duke Huan). When Duke Huan died in 707 BC, his younger brother Chen Tuo murdered Crown Prince Mian and usurped the throne of Chen. Chen Tuo was then killed by the army of the neighbouring Cai state, which restored the throne to Duke Huan's younger son, Yue (Duke Li).

Duke Zhuang I of Wey (衛前莊公) married two princesses of Chen, Li Gui (厲媯) and her younger sister Dai Gui (戴媯), who were likely daughters of Duke Wen of Chen. Dai Gui was the mother of Duke Huan of Wey (衛桓公).

== Bibliography ==
- Han, Zhaoqi, ed. (2010). "Houses of Chen and Qi". Shiji 史记 (in Chinese). Beijing: Zhonghua Book Company. ISBN 978-7-101-07272-3.
- Yang, Bojun, ed. (2009). "Duke Yin". 春秋左传注 [Annotated Chunqiu Zuozhuan] (in Chinese) (3rd revised ed.). Beijing: Zhonghua Book Company. ISBN 978-7-101-07074-3.
