= Heir apparent =

Person who is first in line of succession

An heir apparent is the first person in the order of succession and who cannot be displaced from inheriting by the birth of another person, assuming no change in the laws governing succession. A person who is currently first in the order of succession but could be displaced by the birth of a more eligible heir is an heir presumptive.

Today these terms most commonly describe heirs to hereditary titles (e.g. titles of nobility) or offices, especially when only inheritable by a single person.

Most monarchies designate the heir apparent as crown prince or crown princess, though many also grant them a specific substantive title: (Note: The substantive titles do not usually correspond exactly with the status of heir apparent. See crown prince for examples and information.) Prince of Orange in the Netherlands, Duke of Brabant in Belgium, Prince of Asturias in Spain (or Princess of Asturias, granted to female heirs presumptive), Prince of Wales in England and Wales; formerly Dauphin in the Kingdom of France, and Tsesarevich in Imperial Russia.

Metaphorically, an heir apparent may also be an expected successor to some position of power, such as a political or corporate leader.

This article primarily describes heirs apparent in a hereditary system regulated by laws of primogeniture—it may be less applicable to cases where a monarch has a say in naming the heir (performed either while alive, e.g. crowning the heir as a rex iunior, or through the monarch's will).

== Heir apparent versus heir presumptive ==
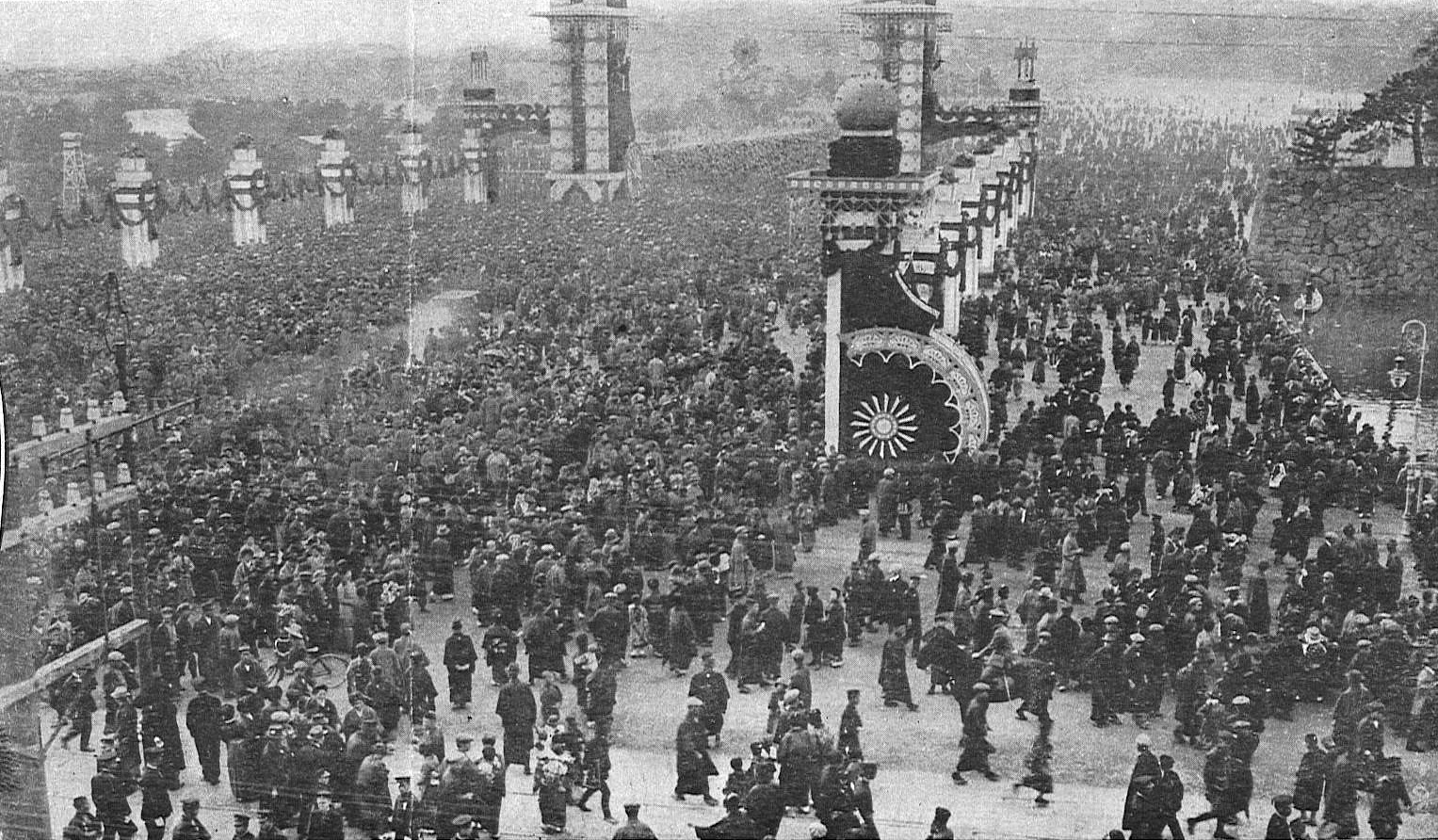
Throngs before the Imperial Palace in Japan awaiting the appearance of the Crown Prince Hirohito for the recent proclamation of his official recognition as the heir apparent to the Japanese Imperial Throne—New York Times, 1916

In a hereditary system governed by some form of primogeniture, an heir apparent is first in the line of succession to a title or office regardless of future births. An heir presumptive, by contrast, can move down in the line of succession by the birth of somebody more closely related in a legal sense (according to that form of primogeniture) to the current title-holder.

The clearest example occurs in the case of a childless bearer of a hereditary title that can only be inherited by one person. If at any time the title bearer were to produce a legitimate child, that child would rank ahead of any former heir presumptive.

Many legal systems assume childbirth is always possible regardless of age or health. A person may be, in a practical sense, the heir apparent but still, legally, only heir presumptive. Indeed, when Queen Victoria succeeded her uncle King William IV, the wording of the proclamation even gave as a caveat:

...saving the rights of any issue of his late Majesty King William IV, which may be born of his late Majesty's consort.

This provided for the possibility that William's widow, Adelaide of Saxe-Meiningen, was pregnant at the moment of his death, since such a posthumous child, regardless of its sex, would have displaced Victoria from the throne. Adelaide was 44 at the time, so pregnancy was possible even if unlikely.

=== Daughters in male-preference primogeniture ===
Daughters (and their lines) may inherit titles that descend according to male-preference primogeniture, but only in default of sons (and their heirs). That is, both female and male offspring have the right to a place somewhere in the order of succession, but when it comes to what that place is, a female will rank behind her brothers regardless of their ages and her age.

Thus, normally, even an only daughter will not be an heir apparent, since at any time a brother might be born who, though younger, would assume that position. Hence, she is an heir presumptive. For example, Queen Elizabeth II was the heir presumptive during the reign of her father, King George VI; had George fathered a legitimate son, then that child would have displaced Elizabeth in the line of succession and become heir apparent.

However, a granddaughter could for example be an heir apparent if she were the only daughter of the deceased eldest son of the sovereign (e.g. Queen Elizabeth II would have been the heir apparent to George V if her oldest uncle and father both had died before their father).

=== Women as heirs apparent ===
In a system of absolute primogeniture that disregards gender, female heirs apparent occur. As succession to titles, positions, or offices in the past most often favoured males, females considered to be an heir apparent were rare. Absolute primogeniture was not practised by any modern monarchy for succession to their thrones until the late twentieth century, with Sweden being the first to adopt absolute primogeniture in 1980 and other Western European monarchies following suit.

Since the adoption of absolute primogeniture by most of the Western European monarchies, examples of female heirs apparent include Crown Princess Victoria of Sweden, Princess Catharina-Amalia of the Netherlands, Princess Elisabeth of Belgium and Crown Princess Ingrid Alexandra of Norway; they are, respectively, the oldest children of Kings Carl XVI Gustaf, Willem-Alexander, Philippe and Haakon VIII. Victoria herself has a female heir apparent in her elder child, Princess Estelle. Victoria was not heir apparent from birth (in 1977), but gained the status in 1980 following a change in the Swedish Act of Succession. Her younger brother Carl Philip (born 1979) was thus heir apparent for a few months (and is a rare example of an heir apparent losing this status without a death occurring).

In 2015, pursuant to the 2011 Perth Agreement, the Commonwealth realms changed the rules of succession to the 16 thrones of Elizabeth II to absolute primogeniture, except for male heirs born before the Perth Agreement. The effects are not likely to be felt for many years; the first two heirs at the time of the agreement (Charles, Prince of Wales, later Charles III, and his son William, Prince of Wales) were already eldest born children, and in 2013 William's first-born son Prince George of Wales became the next apparent successor.

But even in legal systems that apply male-preference primogeniture, female heirs apparent are by no means impossible: if a male heir apparent dies leaving no sons but at least one daughter, then the eldest daughter would replace her father as heir apparent to whatever throne or title is concerned, but only when it has become clear that the widow of the deceased is not pregnant. Then, as the representative of her father's line she would assume a place ahead of any more distant relatives. For example, if George, Prince of Wales (the future George IV) were to have died between 1796 and 1817, his daughter, Princess Charlotte, would have become heir apparent to the British throne, as with her father dead, there would be no possibility she could be displaced by the birth of a younger brother. Such a situation has not to date occurred with the English or British throne; several times an heir apparent has died, but each example has either been childless or left a son or sons. However, there have been several female heirs apparent to British peerages (e.g. Frances Ward, 6th Baroness Dudley, and Henrietta Wentworth, 6th Baroness Wentworth).

In one special case, however, England and Scotland had a female heir apparent. The Revolution settlement that established William and Mary as joint monarchs in 1689 only gave the power to continue the succession through issue to Mary II, elder daughter of the previous king, James II. William, by contrast, was to reign for life only, and his (hypothetical) children by a wife other than Mary would be placed after Mary's younger sister Anne and her descendants in the line of succession. Thus, after Mary's death William continued to reign, but he had no power to beget direct heirs, and Anne became the heir apparent for the remainder of William's reign. She eventually succeeded him as Queen of England, Scotland, and Ireland.

== Displacement of heirs apparent ==
The position of an heir apparent is normally unshakable: it can be assumed they will inherit. Sometimes, however, extraordinary events—such as the death or the deposition of the parent—intervene.

=== People who lost heir apparent status ===
- On 30 April 892, Al-Mufawwid was removed from the succession to the Abbasid Caliphate. When al-Mu'tamid died in October 892, he was succeeded by Al-Mu'tadid.
- Parliament deposed James Francis Edward Stuart, the infant son of King James VII & II (of Scotland and of England and Ireland respectively) whom James II was rearing as a Catholic, as the King's legal heir apparent—declaring that James had, de facto, abdicated—and offered the throne to James II's elder daughter, the young prince's much older Protestant half-sister, Mary (along with her husband, Prince William of Orange). When the exiled King James died in 1701, his Jacobite supporters proclaimed the exiled Prince James Francis Edward as King James VIII of Scotland and James III of England and Ireland; but neither he nor his descendants (the last of whom died in 1807) were ever successful in their bids for the throne.
- Crown Prince Gustav (later known as Gustav, Prince of Vasa), son of Gustav IV Adolf of Sweden, lost his place when his father was deposed and replaced by Gustav IV Adolf's aged uncle, the Duke Carl, who became Charles XIII in 1809. The aged King Charles XIII did not have surviving sons, and Prince Gustav was the only living male of the whole dynasty (besides his deposed father), but the prince was never regarded as heir of Charles XIII, although there were factions in the Riksdag and elsewhere in Sweden who desired to preserve him, and, in the subsequent constitutional elections, supported his election as his grand-uncle's successor. Instead, the government proceeded to have a new crown prince elected (which was the proper constitutional action, if no male heir was left in the dynasty), and the Riksdag elected first August, Prince of Augustenborg, and then, after August's death, the Prince of Ponte Corvo (Marshal Jean-Baptiste Bernadotte, who acceded as Charles XIV John in 1818). The two lines united later, when Charles XIV John's great-grandson Crown Prince Gustaf (who acceded as Gustaf V in 1907) married Gustav IV Adolf's great-granddaughter Victoria of Baden, who became Crown Princess of Sweden. Thus, from Gustav VI Adolf onward, the kings of Sweden are direct descendants of both Gustav IV Adolf and his son's replacement as crown prince, Charles XIV John.
- Prince Carl Philip of Sweden, at his birth in 1979, was heir apparent to the throne of Sweden. Less than eight months later, a change in that country's succession laws instituted absolute primogeniture, and Carl Philip was supplanted as heir apparent by his elder sister Victoria.
- Muqrin bin Abdulaziz became Crown Prince of Saudi Arabia in January 2015 upon the death of his half-brother King Abdullah bin Abdulaziz Al Saud and the accession of another half-brother, Salman bin Abdulaziz Al Saud, to the Saudi throne. In April of that year, Salman removed Muqrin as Crown Prince, replacing him with their nephew Muhammad bin Nayef. Muhammad bin Nayef himself was later replaced as Crown Prince by the king's son Mohammad bin Salman.

=== Breaching legal qualification of heirs apparent ===
In some jurisdictions, an heir apparent can automatically lose that status by breaching certain constitutional rules. Today, for example:

- A British heir apparent would lose this status if he or she became a Catholic. This is the only religion-based restriction on the heir apparent. Previously, marrying a Catholic also equated to losing this status. However, in October 2011 the governments of the then-16 Commonwealth realms (now 15), of which King Charles III is monarch, agreed to remove the restriction on marriage to a Catholic. All of the Commonwealth realms subsequently passed legislation to implement the change, which fully took effect in March 2015.
- Swedish Crown Princes and Crown Princesses would lose heir apparent status, according to the Act of Succession, if they married without approval of the monarch and the Government, abandoned the "pure Evangelical faith", or accepted another throne without the approval of the Riksdag.
- Dutch Princes and Princesses of Orange would lose status as heir to the throne if they married without the approval of the States-General, or simply renounced the right.
- Spanish Princes and Princesses of Asturias would lose status if they married against the express prohibition of the monarch and the Cortes.
- Belgian Dukes and Duchesses of Brabant would lose heir apparent status if they married without the consent of the monarch, or became monarch of another country.
- Danish Crown Princes and Princesses would lose status if they married without the permission of the monarch. When the monarch grants permission for a dynast to enter marriage, he may set conditions that must be met for the dynasts and/or their children to gain or maintain a place in the line of succession; this also applies for Crown Princes and Princesses.

== Current heirs apparent ==
| Country | Picture | Name of heir apparent | Title | Date of birth (age) | Relation to monarch |
|---|---|---|---|---|---|
| Bahrain | | Salman bin Hamad Al Khalifa | Crown Prince of Bahrain | October 21, 1969 (age 56) | eldest son |
| Belgium | | Elisabeth | Princess, Duchess of Brabant | October 25, 2001 (age 24) | eldest child |
| Bhutan | | Jigme Namgyel Wangchuck | Dragon Prince of Bhutan, Druk Gyalsey of Bhutan | February 5, 2016 (age 10) | eldest child |
| Brunei | | Al-Muhtadee Billah | Crown Prince of Brunei Darussalam | February 17, 1974 (age 52) | eldest son |
| Denmark | | Christian | Crown Prince of Denmark, Count of Monpezat | October 15, 2005 (age 20) | eldest child |
| Jordan | | Hussein bin Abdullah | Crown Prince of Jordan | June 28, 1994 (age 32) | elder son |
| Kuwait | | Sabah Al-Khalid Al-Sabah | Crown Prince of Kuwait | March 3, 1953 (age 73) | maternal half-nephew and paternal second cousin |
| Lesotho | | Lerotholi Seeiso | Crown Prince of Lesotho | April 18, 2007 (age 19) | only son |
| Liechtenstein | | Alois | Hereditary Prince of Liechtenstein, Count of Rietberg | June 11, 1968 (age 58) | eldest son |
| Luxembourg | | Charles | Hereditary Grand Duke of Luxembourg (from 18) | May 10, 2020 (age 6) | elder son |
| Monaco | | Jacques | Hereditary Prince of Monaco, Marquis of Baux | December 10, 2014 (age 11) | only legitimate son |
| Morocco | | Moulay Hassan | Crown Prince of Morocco | May 8, 2003 (age 23) | only son |
| Netherlands | | Catharina-Amalia | Princess of Orange | December 7, 2003 (age 22) | eldest child |
| Norway | | Ingrid Alexandra | Crown Princess of Norway | January 21, 2004 (age 22) | eldest child |
| Oman | | Theyazin bin Haitham | Sayyid, Crown Prince of Oman | August 21, 1990 (age 36) | eldest son |
| Saudi Arabia | | Mohammad bin Salman bin Abdulaziz Al Saud | Crown Prince of Saudi Arabia | August 31, 1985 (age 41) | child |
| Sweden | | Victoria | Crown Princess of Sweden, Duchess of Västergötland | July 14, 1977 (age 49) | eldest child |
| Tonga | | Tupoutoʻa ʻUlukalala | Crown Prince of Tonga | September 17, 1985 (age 41) | elder son |
| United Kingdom and 14 other Commonwealth realms | | William | Prince of Wales, Earl of Chester, Duke of Cornwall, Duke of Rothesay, Earl of Carrick, Baron of Renfrew, Lord of the Isles, Prince and Great Steward of Scotland | June 21, 1982 (age 44) | elder son |

== Heirs apparent who never inherited the throne ==
=== Heirs apparent who predeceased the monarch ===
| Heir apparent | Lived | Heir of | Cause of death |
|---|---|---|---|
| Kawab | Died before 2566 BC | Khufu | Unknown causes |
| Setka | Died before 2558 BC | Djedefre | Unknown causes |
| Yanassi | Died before 1580 BC | Khyan | Unknown causes |
| Ahmose-ankh | Died before 1525 BC | Ahmose I | Unknown causes |
| Amenemhat | Died c. 1455 BC | Thutmose III | Plague |
| Amenmose | Died before 1493 BC | Thutmose I | Unknown causes |
| Amenhotep | Died before 1401 BC | Amenhotep II | Unknown causes |
| Thutmose | Died before 1353 BC | Amenhotep III | Unknown causes |
| Nakhtmin | Died before 1323 BC | Ay | Either died of unknown causes or was killed by Horemheb |
| Amun-her-khepeshef | Died c. 1254 BC | Ramesses II | Unknown causes |
| Ramesses | Died c. 1229 BC | Ramesses II | Unknown causes |
| Khaemweset | Died c. 1224 BC | Ramesses II | Unknown causes |
| Amun-her-khepeshef | Died before 1155 BC | Ramesses III | Unknown causes |
| Crown Prince Mian | Died 707 BC | Duke Huan of Chen | Killed by uncle Chen Tuo |
| Yukou | BC 672 | Duke Xuan of Chen | Killed |
| Fusu | Died 210 BC | Qin Shi Huang | Forced to commit suicide |
| Liu Ju | BC 128–BC 91 | Emperor Wu of Han | Killed |
| Pacorus I | Died BC 38 | Orodes II of Parthia | Killed in battle |
| Gaius Caesar | BC 20–4 AD | Augustus | Wounds |
| Lucius Caesar | BC 17–2 AD | Augustus | Sudden illness |
| Germanicus | BC 15–19 AD | Tiberius | Mysterious illness |
| Drusus Julius Caesar | BC 13–23 AD | Tiberius | Suspected poisoning |
| Nero Julius Caesar | 6–31 | Tiberius | Starvation |
| Drusus Caesar | 7–33 | Tiberius | Starvation |
| Tiberius Gemellus | 19–37 | Caligula | Killed |
| Flavius Caesar | 73–82 | Domitian | Illness |
| Lucius Aelius Caesar | 101–138 | Hadrian | Hemorrhage |
| Marcus Annius Verus Caesar | 162–169 | Marcus Aurelius | Natural causes |
| Cao Ang | Died in 197 | Cao Cao | Killed in battle |
| Sun Deng | 209–241 | Emperor Da of Wu | Illness |
| Valerian II | Died 258 | Gallienus | Died under mysterious circumstances |
| Liu Xuan | 224–264 | Liu Shan | Killed in Disaster of Yongjia |
| Sima Yu | 278–300 | Emperor Hui of Jin | Killed by Empress Jia Nanfeng |
| Nigrinian | Died 284/285 | Carinus | Unknown causes |
| Tuoba Huang | 428–451 | Emperor Taiwu of Northern Wei | Unknown causes |
| Xiao Zhangmao | 458–493 | Emperor Wu of Southern Qi | Illness |
| Xiao Tong | 501–531 | Emperor Wu of Liang | Illness |
| Yang Zhao | 584–606 | Emperor Yang of Sui | Illness |
| Li Jiancheng | 589–626 | Emperor Gaozu of Tang | Killed during the Xuanwu Gate Incident |
| Mardanshah | Died 628 | Khosrow II | Killed |
| Li Hong | 652–675 | Emperor Gaozong of Tang | Illness |
| Prince Kusakabe | 662–689 | Empress Jitō | Illness |
| Li Chongrun | 682–701 | Emperor Zhongzong of Tang | Executed by Empress Wu Zetian |
| Li Chongjun | 683–707 | Emperor Zhongzong of Tang | Killed after coup |
| Li Ying | Died in 737 | Emperor Xuanzong of Tang | Killed |
| Li Ning | 793–812 | Emperor Xianzong of Tang | Illness |
| Li Yong | Died in 838 | Emperor Wenzong of Tang | Unknown cause |
| Liudolf, Duke of Swabia | 930–957 | Otto the Great | Fever |
| Saint Emeric of Hungary | 1007–1031 | Stephen I of Hungary | Hunting accident |
| Edward the Exile | 1016–1057 | Edward the Confessor | Unknown cause |
| Henry of Burgundy | 1035–1070 | Robert I, Duke of Burgundy | Unknown cause |
| Sancho Alfónsez | 1093–1108 | Alfonso VI of León and Castile | Killed at the Battle of Uclés |
| William Adelin | 1103–1120 | Henry I of England | Drowned in the White Ship disaster |
| Zhao Fu | 1127–1129 | Emperor Gaozong of Song | Illness |
| Henry of Scotland | 1114–1152 | David I of Scotland | Illness |
| Roger III, Duke of Apulia | 1118–1148 | Roger II of Sicily | Unknown causes |
| Count Eustace IV of Boulogne | 1127–1153 | Stephen, King of England | Sudden death |
| Henry Berengar | 1136–1150 | Conrad III of Germany | Illness |
| Peter of Barcelona | 1152–1157 | Petronilla of Aragon and Ramon Berenguer IV, Count of Barcelona | Unknown cause |
| Roger IV, Duke of Apulia | 1152–1161 | William I of Sicily | Arrow to the eye |
| William IX, Count of Poitiers | 1153–1156 | Henry II of England | Seizure |
| Henry the Young King | 1155–1183 | Henry II of England | Dysentery |
| Ferdinand of Castile | 1189–1211 | Alfonso VIII of Castile | Fever |
| Ferdinand of León | 1192–1214 | Alfonso IX of León | Unknown cause |
| Naratheinga Uzana | 1197–1235 | Htilominlo | Unknown cause |
| Sigurd Lavard | Died 1200 | Sverre of Norway | Unknown cause |
| Alexios Palaiologos | Died 1203 | Alexios III Angelos | Natural causes |
| Valdemar the Young | 1209–1231 | Valdemar II of Denmark | Hunting accident |
| Andronikos Palaiologos | Died 1216 | Theodore I Laskaris | Disease |
| Vladislaus III of Moravia | 1228–1247 | Wenceslaus I of Bohemia | Illness |
| Thihathu of Pagan | 1230s–1256 | Uzana of Pagan | Assassinated |
| Odo, Count of Nevers | 1230–1266 | Hugh IV, Duke of Burgundy | Died during Crusades |
| John, Count of Charolais | 1231–1268 | Hugh IV, Duke of Burgundy | Illness |
| Haakon the Young | 1232–1257 | Haakon IV of Norway | Illness |
| Zhenjin | 1243–1286 | Kublai Khan | Illness |
| Louis of France | 1244–1260 | Louis IX of France | Illness |
| George | 1250–1268 | David VII of Georgia | Bowel disease |
| Fernando de la Cerda | 1255–1275 | Alfonso X of Castile | Unexpected causes |
| Louis of France | 1264–1276 | Philip III of France | Illness |
| Alexander, Prince of Scotland | 1264–1284 | Alexander III of Scotland | Illness |
| Henry, son of Edward I | 1268–1274 | Edward I of England | Illness |
| Theingapati | 1270s–1299 | Kyawswa of Pagan | Assassinated |
| Charles Martel of Anjou | 1271–1295 | Charles II of Naples | Plague |
| Louis I, Count of Nevers | 1272–1322 | Robert III, Count of Flanders | Illness |
| Alphonso, Earl of Chester | 1273–1284 | Edward I of England | Illness |
| Charles, Duke of Calabria | 1298–1328 | Robert, King of Naples | Illness |
| Eric Christoffersen | 1307–1332 | Christopher II of Denmark | Died in battle |
| Otto the Younger | 1322–1366 | Henry II, Landgrave of Hesse | Illness |
| Philip I, Count of Auvergne | 1323–1346 | Odo IV, Duke of Burgundy and Joan III, Countess of Burgundy | Fell from horse during siege |
| Edward the Black Prince | 1330–1376 | Edward III of England | A long lasting illness |
| Christopher, Duke of Lolland | 1341–1363 | Valdemar IV of Denmark | Illness |
| Charles Martel, Duke of Calabria | 1345–1348 | Joanna I of Naples | Illness |
| Zhu Biao | 1355–1392 | Hongwu Emperor | Illness |
| Martin I of Sicily | 1374–1409 | Martin of Aragon | Malaria |
| David Stewart, Duke of Rothesay | 1378–1402 | Robert III of Scotland | Starvation |
| Henry V of England | 1387–1422 | Charles VI of France (by the Treaty of Troyes) | Dysentery |
| Minye Kyawswa | 1391–1415 | Minkhaung I | Killed in battle |
| Peter of Aragon | 1394–1400 | Martin I of Sicily and Maria, Queen of Sicily | Wound from spear |
| Louis, Duke of Guyenne | 1397–1415 | Charles VI of France | Dysentery |
| John, Duke of Touraine | 1398–1417 | Charles VI of France | Abscess to the head |
| Martin of Aragon | 1406–1407 | Martin I of Sicily | Illness |
| Richard of York, 3rd Duke of York | 1411–1460 | Henry VI of England (by Act of Accord) | Killed in battle |
| Charles, Prince of Viana | 1421–1461 | John II of Aragon and Navarre | Unknown causes |
| Alexander Stewart, Duke of Rothesay | 1430 | James I of Scotland | Illness |
| Crown Prince Uigyeong | 1438–1457 | Sejo of Joseon | Illness |
| Gaston, Prince of Viana | 1444–1470 | Gaston IV, Count of Foix | Wounds in jousting tournament |
| Zhu Jianji | 1448–1453 | Jingtai Emperor | Illness |
| John, Prince of Portugal | 1451 | Afonso V of Portugal | Sudden death |
| Edward of Westminster, Prince of Wales | 1453–1471 | Henry VI of England | Killed at the Battle of Tewkesbury |
| Ivan the Young | 1458–1490 | Ivan III of Russia | Gout |
| Zhu Youji | 1469–1472 | Chenghua Emperor | Illness |
| Edward of Middleham, Prince of Wales | 1473–1484 | Richard III of England | Unknown |
| Afonso, Prince of Portugal | 1475–1491 | John II of Portugal | Horse riding accident |
| John, Prince of Asturias | 1478–1497 | Isabella I of Castile and Ferdinand II of Aragon | Tuberculosis |
| Philip I of Castile | 1478–1506 | Maximilian I, Holy Roman Emperor | Typhoid fever |
| Arthur, Prince of Wales | 1486–1502 | Henry VII of England | Unknown illness |
| Charles Orlando, Dauphin of France | 1492–1495 | Charles VIII of France | Measles |
| Miguel da Paz, Prince of Portugal | 1498–1500 | Manuel I of Portugal | Illness |
| John, Hereditary Prince of Saxony | 1498–1537 | George, Duke of Saxony | Illness |
| Frederick, Hereditary Prince of Saxony | 1504–1539 | George, Duke of Saxony | Illness |
| James, Duke of Rothesay | 1507–1508 | James IV of Scotland | Illness |
| Arthur Stewart, Duke of Rothesay | 1509–1510 | James IV of Scotland | Illness |
| Magnus III of Mecklenburg-Schwerin | 1509–1550 | Henry V, Duke of Mecklenburg | Illness |
| Henry, Duke of Cornwall | 1511 | Henry VIII of England | Sudden death |
| Şehzade Mustafa | 1515–1553 | Suleiman the Magnificent | Executed |
| Francis III of Brittany | 1518–1536 | Francis I of France | Tuberculosis |
| Bhoj Raj | Died 1526 | Rana Sanga | Died in battle |
| Afonso, Prince of Portugal | 1526 | John III of Portugal | Illness |
| Prince George of Kakheti | 1529–1561 | Levan of Kakheti | Died in battle |
| Manuel, Prince of Portugal | 1531–1537 | John III of Portugal | Illness |
| Philip, Hereditary Prince of Portugal | 1533–1539 | John III of Portugal | Illness |
| João Manuel, Hereditary Prince of Portugal | 1537–1554 | John III of Portugal | Tuberculosis or diabetes |
| Crown Prince Sunhoe | 1551–1563 | Myeongjong of Joseon | Illness |
| Tsarevich Dmitry Ivanovich of Russia | 1552–1553 | Ivan IV of Russia | Drowned |
| Tsarevich Ivan Ivanovich of Russia | 1554–1581 | Ivan IV of Russia | Wounds to the head inflicted by his father during a dispute |
| Karl Friedrich of Jülich-Cleves-Berg | 1555–1575 | William, Duke of Jülich-Cleves-Berg | Smallpox |
| Mingyi Swa | 1558–1593 | Nanda Bayin | Killed in battle |
| Prince George of Kakheti | 1570–1605 | Alexander II of Kakheti | Killed alongside his father |
| Ferdinand, Prince of Asturias | 1571–1578 | Philip II of Spain | Dysentery |
| Diego, Prince of Asturias | 1575–1582 | Philip II of Spain | Smallpox |
| Philip de' Medici | 1577–1582 | Francesco I de' Medici, Grand Duke of Tuscany | Hydrocephalus |
| John Ernest, Hereditary Count of Nassau-Siegen | 1582–1617 | John VII, Count of Nassau-Siegen | Dysentery |
| Philip Emmanuel, Prince of Piedmont | 1586–1605 | Charles Emmanuel I, Duke of Savoy | Smallpox |
| Khusrau Mirza | 1587–1622 | Jahangir | Killed by his brother Shah Jahan |
| Henry Frederick, Prince of Wales | 1594–1612 | James VI and I of Scotland and England | Typhoid fever |
| Otto, Landgrave of Hesse-Kassel | 1594–1617 | Maurice, Landgrave of Hesse-Kassel | Accidentally shot himself |
| Christian, Prince-Elect of Denmark | 1603–1647 | Christian IV of Denmark | Illness |
| Louis of Anhalt-Köthen (the Younger) | 1607–1624 | Louis I, Prince of Anhalt-Köthen | Illness |
| Charles II Gonzaga, Duke of Nevers | 1609–1631 | Charles I Gonzaga, Duke of Mantua and Montferrat | Illness |
| Crown Prince Sohyeon | 1612–1645 | Injo of Joseon | Bleeding from the head |
| Henry Frederick, Hereditary Prince of the Palatinate | 1614–1629 | Frederick V of the Palatinate | Drowned |
| Erdmann August, Hereditary Prince of Brandenburg-Bayreuth | 1615–1651 | Christian, Margrave of Brandenburg-Bayreuth | Illness |
| Dara Shikoh | 1615–1659 | Shah Jahan | Killed by his brother Aurangzeb |
| George Louis, Prince of Nassau-Dillenburg | 1618–1656 | Louis Henry, Prince of Nassau-Dillenburg | Illness |
| Maurice Frederick of Nassau-Siegen | 1621–1638 | William, Count of Nassau-Siegen | Died in the Battle of Kallo |
| Ercole, Marquis of Baux | 1623–1651 | Honoré II, Prince of Monaco | Gunshot wound |
| Ferdinand Maximilian, Hereditary Prince of Baden-Baden | 1625–1669 | William, Margrave of Baden-Baden | Hunting accident |
| Balthasar Charles, Prince of Asturias | 1626–1646 | Philip IV of Spain | Smallpox |
| Ferdinand IV, King of the Romans | 1633–1654 | Ferdinand III, Holy Roman Emperor | Smallpox |
| Theodosius III, Duke of Braganza and Prince of Brazil | 1634–1653 | John IV of Portugal | Tuberculosis |
| Sigismund Casimir | 1640–1647 | Władysław IV Vasa | Dysentery |
| Tsarevich Dmitry Alexeyevich of Russia | 1648–1649 | Alexis of Russia | Illness |
| Prince Luarsab of Kartli | Died 1652 | Rostom of Kartli | Gunshot wound |
| Tsarevich Alexei Alexeyevich of Russia | 1654–1670 | Alexis of Russia | Illness |
| Leopold George, Hereditary Landgrave of Hesse-Homburg | 1654–1675 | William Christoph, Landgrave of Hesse-Homburg | Illness |
| Prince Mamuka of Imereti | Died 1654 | Rostom of Kartli | Died in captivity |
| Charles, Electoral Prince of Brandenburg | 1655–1674 | Frederick William, Elector of Brandenburg | Dysentery |
| Philip Prospero, Prince of Asturias | 1657–1661 | Philip IV of Spain | Epileptic attack |
| Louis, le grand Dauphin | 1661–1711 | Louis XIV of France | Smallpox |
| Ferdinando de' Medici, Grand Prince of Tuscany | 1663–1713 | Cosimo III de' Medici, Grand Duke of Tuscany | Illness |
| Charles of Mecklenburg-Güstrow | 1664–1688 | Gustav Adolph, Duke of Mecklenburg-Güstrow | Smallpox |
| Odoardo Farnese, Hereditary Prince of Parma | 1666–1693 | Ranuccio II Farnese, Duke of Parma | Illness |
| Archduke Leopold Joseph of Austria | 1682–1684 | Leopold I, Holy Roman Emperor | Illness |
| Louis, Dauphin and Duke of Burgundy | 1682–1712 | Louis XIV of France | Measles |
| João, Prince of Brazil | 1688 | Peter II of Portugal | Illness |
| Birbhadra Shah | Died c.1697 | Prithvipati Shah | Illness |
| Joseph Ferdinand, Electoral Prince of Bavaria | 1692–1699 | Maximilian II Emanuel, Elector of Bavaria | Sudden illness |
| Count Palatine Joseph Charles of Sulzbach | 1694–1729 | Theodore Eustace, Count Palatine of Sulzbach | Illness |
| Friedrich Ludwig, Hereditary Prince of Württemberg | 1698–1731 | Eberhard Louis, Duke of Württemberg | Illness |
| Victor Amadeus, Prince of Piedmont | 1699–1715 | Victor Amadeus II of Sardinia | Smallpox |
| Archduke Leopold Joseph of Austria | 1700–1701 | Joseph I, Holy Roman Emperor | Hydrocephalus |
| Frédéric Maurice Casimir de La Tour d'Auvergne | 1702–1723 | Emmanuel Théodose de La Tour d'Auvergne | Illness |
| Frederick, Hereditary Prince of Baden-Durlach | 1703–1732 | Charles III William, Margrave of Baden-Durlach | Illness |
| Louis, Hereditary Prince of Lorraine | 1704–1711 | Leopold, Duke of Lorraine | Smallpox |
| Joseph, Hereditary Prince of Hesse-Rotenburg | 1705–1744 | Ernest Leopold, Landgrave of Hesse-Rotenburg | Illness |
| Ludwig Gruno of Hesse-Homburg | 1705–1745 | Frederick III, Landgrave of Hesse-Homburg | Illness |
| Louis, Dauphin and Duke of Brittany | 1707–1712 | Louis XIV of France | Measles |
| Léopold Clément, Hereditary Prince of Lorraine | 1707–1723 | Leopold, Duke of Lorraine | Smallpox |
| Frederick, Prince of Wales | 1707–1751 | George II of Great Britain | A burst abscess in the lung |
| Pedro, Prince of Brazil | 1712–1714 | John V of Portugal | Unknown disease |
| Peter Petrovich | 1715–1719 | Peter the Great | Unknown causes |
| Crown Prince Hyojang | 1719–1728 | Yeongjo of Joseon | Illness |
| Louis, Dauphin of France | 1729–1765 | Louis XV of France | Tuberculosis |
| Yonglian | 1730–1738 | Qianlong Emperor | Smallpox |
| Crown Prince Sado of Joseon (Korea) | 1735–1762 | Yeongjo of Joseon (Korea) | His father killed him by locking him in a rice chest |
| Lê Duy Vĩ | 1745–1772 | Lê Hiển Tông | Executed |
| Charles Louis, Hereditary Prince of Baden | 1755–1801 | Charles Frederick, Margrave of Baden | Illness |
| Shō Tetsu | 1759–1788 | Shō Boku | Unknown cause |
| José, Prince of Brazil | 1761–1788 | Maria I of Portugal | Smallpox |
| Thado Minsaw | 1762–1808 | Bodawpaya | Illness |
| Karl Georg August, Hereditary Prince of Brunswick-Wolfenbüttel | 1766–1806 | Charles William Ferdinand, Duke of Brunswick | Illness |
| Charles August, Crown Prince of Sweden | 1768–1810 | Charles XIII of Sweden | Stroke |
| Frederick, Hereditary Prince of Anhalt-Dessau | 1769–1814 | Leopold III, Duke of Anhalt-Dessau | Illness |
| Carlo, Duke of Calabria | 1775–1778 | Ferdinand IV of Naples | Smallpox |
| Frederick Louis, Hereditary Grand Duke of Mecklenburg-Schwerin | 1778–1819 | Frederick Francis I, Grand Duke of Mecklenburg-Schwerin | Illness |
| Nguyễn Phúc Cảnh | 1780–1801 | Gia Long Emperor | Smallpox |
| Louis Joseph, Dauphin of France | 1781–1789 | Louis XVI of France | Tuberculosis |
| Crown Prince Munhyo | 1782–1788 | Jeongjo of Joseon | Illness |
| Abbas Mirza | 1789–1833 | Fath-Ali Shah Qajar | Illness |
| Mirza Dara Bakht | 1790–1841 | Bahadur Shah Zafar | Illness |
| Crown Prince Hyomyeong | 1809–1830 | Sunjo of Joseon | Illness |
| Prince Ferdinand Philippe, Duke of Orléans | 1810–1842 | Louis Philippe I of France | Carriage accident |
| Mirza Fath-ul-Mulk Bahadur | 1816–1856 | Bahadur Shah Zafar | Cholera |
| Kanaung Mintha | 1820–1866 | Mindon Min | Assassinated |
| Tēvita ʻUnga | 1824–1879 | George Tupou I | Liver ailment |
| Louis Philippe, Crown Prince of Belgium | 1833–1834 | Leopold I of Belgium | Inflammation of mucous membrane |
| Victoria Kamāmalu | 1838–1866 | Kamehameha V | Illness |
| Keaweaweulaokalani I | 1839 | Kamehameha III | Illness |
| William, Prince of Orange | 1840–1879 | William III of the Netherlands | Debauchery |
| Keaweaweulaokalani II | 1842 | Kamehameha III | Illness |
| Nicholas Alexandrovich, Tsarevich of Russia | 1843–1865 | Alexander II of Russia | Meningitis |
| Vuna Takitakimālohi | 1844–1862 | George Tupou I | Illness |
| Raja Musa ibni Sultan Abdul Samad | 1844–1884 | Abdul Samad of Selangor | Unknown causes |
| Charles Augustus, Hereditary Grand Duke of Saxe-Weimar-Eisenach | 1844–1894 | Charles Alexander, Grand Duke of Saxe-Weimar-Eisenach | Illness |
| Afonso, Prince Imperial of Brazil | 1845–1847 | Pedro II of Brazil | Epilepsy |
| Trailokya, Crown Prince of Nepal | 1847–1878 | Surendra of Nepal | Unknown causes |
| Pedro Afonso, Prince Imperial of Brazil | 1848–1850 | Pedro II of Brazil | Fever |
| ʻElisiva Fusipala Taukiʻonetuku | 1850–1889 | George Tupou I | Illness |
| Alexander, Prince of Orange | 1851–1884 | William III of the Netherlands | Typhus |
| Leleiohoku II | 1854–1877 | Kalākaua | Rheumatic fever |
| ʻUelingatoni Ngū | 1854–1885 | George Tupou I | Illness |
| Ludvonga | 1855–1872 | Mswati II | Poisoned |
| Leopold, Hereditary Prince of Anhalt | 1855–1886 | Frederick I, Duke of Anhalt | Illness |
| Şehzade Yusuf Izzeddin | 1857–1916 | Mehmed V | Suicide (disputed) |
| Albert Kamehameha | 1858–1862 | Kamehameha IV | Meningitis |
| Rudolf, Crown Prince of Austria | 1858–1889 | Franz Joseph I of Austria | Suicide (disputed) |
| Prince Leopold, Duke of Brabant | 1859–1869 | Leopold II of Belgium | Pneumonia, after falling into a pond |
| Nalesoni Laifone | 1859–1889 | George Tupou I | Illness |
| Araya Selassie Yohannes | 1869/1870–1888 | Yohannes IV | Smallpox |
| Alfred, Hereditary Prince of Saxe-Coburg and Gotha | 1874–1899 | Alfred, Duke of Saxe-Coburg and Gotha | Unclear circumstances |
| Maha Vajirunhis, Crown Prince of Siam | 1878–1895 | Rama V | Typhoid |
| Luís Filipe, Prince Royal of Portugal | 1887–1908 | Carlos I of Portugal and the Algarves | Jointly assassinated with his father (Note: Some historians suggest he did become king as Luís II for a few minutes between his father’s death and his own, though few if any official lists of Portuguese monarchs include him. Portuguese law only acknowledged the reigns of kings who were acclaimed by the parliament.) |
| Hamad bin Abdullah Al Thani | 1896–1948 | Abdullah bin Jassim Al Thani | Illness |
| Turki I bin Abdulaziz Al Saud | 1900–1919 | Abdulaziz of Saudi Arabia | Flu |
| Sultan, Crown Prince of Saudi Arabia | 1925–2011 | Abdullah of Saudi Arabia | Illness |
| Muhammed Akbar Khan, Crown Prince of Afghanistan | 1933–1941 | Mohammed Zahir Shah | Illness |
| Nayef, Crown Prince of Saudi Arabia | 1934–2012 | Abdullah of Saudi Arabia | Illness |
| Muhammad bin Sultan Al Qasimi | 1974–1999 | Sultan bin Muhammad Al-Qasimi | Heroin overdose |
| Khalid bin Sultan Al Qasimi | 1980–2019 | Sultan bin Muhammad Al-Qasimi | Drug overdose |

=== Heirs apparent who abandoned or were forced to abandon their claims ===
| Heir apparent | Birth/death | Heir to | Reason for abandoning claim |
|---|---|---|---|
| Darius | Died 465 BC | Xerxes I | Upon the murder of Xerxes I, Darius was framed for the murder by Artabanus and subsequently executed |
| Liu Rong | Died 148 BC | Emperor Jing of Han | Disinherited after his mother angered the emperor by requesting the position of empress and refusing to allow the marriage of Liu Rong to Chen Jiao |
| Kunala | Born 263 BC | Ashoka | Blinded |
| Antipater | 46–4 BC | Herod the Great | Disinherited after being charged with intended murder. Subsequently executed. |
| Alexander | 35–7 BC | Herod the Great | Disinherited and executed |
| Aristobulus IV | 31–7 BC | Herod the Great | Disinherited and executed |
| Herod II | 27 BC–AD 33 | Herod the Great | Disinherited |
| Agrippa Postumus | 12 BC–AD 14 | Augustus | Banished. Later executed by his own guards after the accession of Tiberius |
| Liu Jiang | 25–58 | Emperor Guangwu of Han | Disinherited after his mother lost the position of empress |
| Sun He | 224–253 | Sun Quan | Replaced with his brother Sun Liang |
| Sima Ying | 279–306 | Emperor Hui of Jin | Replaced as heir by Emperor Huai of Jin |
| Crispus | 295–326 | Constantine the Great | Executed by his father |
| Dalmatius | Died 337 | Constantine the Great | Appointed Caesar alongside Constantine's sons Constantine II, Constans I, and Constantius II. Was killed in the massacre of the Constantinian family following the Emperor's death and his territory was split between Constantius II and Constans I. |
| Constantius Gallus | 326–354 | Constantius II | Executed after falling out of favor with the emperor |
| Prince Kinashi no Karu | Died 453 | Emperor Ingyō | His brother Emperor Ankō took the throne instead |
| Yuan Xun | 483–497 | Emperor Xiaowen of Northern Wei | Disagreement of his father's policy |
| Hermenegild | Died 585 | Liuvigild | Disinherited for rebellion |
| Yang Yong | Died 604 | Emperor Wen of Sui | Forced to abdicate and killed by younger brother Yang Guang |
| Li Chengqian | 619–645 | Emperor Taizong of Tang | Attempted to overthrow his father and kill his brother by coup. Exiled for immorality and treason |
| Li Zhong | 642–665 | Emperor Gaozong of Tang | Empress Wu Zetian got the favor from Gaozong and his position was taken by his half brother Li Hong |
| Li Xian | 655–684 | Emperor Gaozong of Tang | Exiled by Empress Wu Zetian from rumors. Was later forced to commit suicide after Gaozong's death |
| Prince Kusakabe | 662–689 | Emperor Tenmu | Did not assume throne |
| Abd al-Aziz ibn Marwan | Died 705 | Marwan I | Removed from line of succession |
| Li Chengqi | 679–742 | Emperor Ruizong of Tang | Gave up the claim because he thought that he did not have the strength to be a wise emperor and his position was taken by his half brother Li Longji |
| Alexios Mosele | 9th century | Theophilos | Disinherited for rebellion |
| Al-Mufawwid | Died 890s | Al-Mu'tamid (Abbasid caliph) | On 30 April 892, Al-Mufawwid was removed from the succession by his cousin, al-Mu'tadid and when al-Mu'tamid died in October 892, he was succeeded by al-Mu'tadid. |
| Al-Abbas ibn Ahmad ibn Tulun | Died 884 | Ahmad ibn Tulun | Disinherited for attempting to overthrow his father |
| Li Yu | Died in 904 | Emperor Zhaozong of Tang | Actually inherited the throne in fact, but not recognized as an emperor. Became crown prince again after two months and killed by Zhu Wen |
| Prince Tsunesada | 825–884 | Emperor Ninmyō | Disinherited in the Jōwa Incident |
| Yelü Bei | 899–937 | Emperor Taizu of Liao | Kept the favor away from her mother Empress Shulü Ping, because he thought their political view were totally opposite and his position was taken by his brother Yelü Deguang. |
| Fujiwara no Korechika | 974–1010 | Fujiwara no Michitaka | Lost in Chōtoku Incident to his uncle Fujiwara no Michinaga who seize the power and lost the position to inherent Kampaku. |
| Prince Atsuyasu | 999–1019 | Emperor Ichijō | Kugyō Fujiwara no Yukinari and Fujiwara no Michinaga forced him to give up the status and his half brother Prince Atsuhira took his position. |
| Abd al-Rahim ibn Ilyas | Died 1020s | Al-Hakim bi-Amr Allah | Sidelined upon Al-Hakim's death in favor of Al-Zahir li-i'zaz Din Allah, who had him arrested and imprisoned. |
| Al-Malik al-Aziz | Died 1049 | Jalal al-Dawla | Late ruler's nephew Abu Kalijar took the throne instead |
| Peter Raymundi | Born 1050 | Ramon Berenguer I, Count of Barcelona | Disinherited and exiled for killing his stepmother Almodis of La Marche |
| Conrad II of Italy | 1074–1101 | Henry IV, Holy Roman Emperor | Disinherited for rebellion |
| Min Shin Saw | 1117–1167 | Alaungsithu | Exiled |
| William I, Count of Boulogne | 1137–1159 | Stephen, King of England | Treaty of Wallingford dictated the succession of Henry II of England, who was the nephew of Stephen |
| Demna of Georgia | 1155–1178 | David V of Georgia | Imprisoned, blinded and castrated by his uncle, King George III of Georgia. Died in prison. |
| Zhao Hong | Died 1225 | Emperor Ningzong | Shi Miyuan and Empress Yang faked the edict of emperor. |
| Henry (VII) of Germany | 1211–1242 | Frederick II, Holy Roman Emperor | Disinherited for rebellion |
| Louis of Toulouse | 1274–1297 | Charles II of Naples | Renounced rights to become a clergyman. His position of crown prince was taken by his brother Robert. |
| James of Majorca | 1275–1330 | James II of Majorca | Renounced rights to become a monk. His position of crown prince was taken by his brother Sancho. |
| Charles Robert of Anjou | 1288–1342 | Charles II of Naples | His uncle Robert was made heir instead on 13 February 1296. Charles was later compensated by being made King of Hungary and Croatia. |
| James of Aragon | 1296–1334 | James II of Aragon | Renounced rights to become a monk. His position of crown prince was taken by his brother Alfonso. |
| Otto, Duke of Lolland and Estonia | 1310–1346 | Christopher II of Denmark | Forced to surrender claim to the throne in favor of his brother Valdemar IV of Denmark |
| Prince Narinaga | 1326–c. 1337–44 | Emperor Kōmyō | Killed or deposed by Ashikaga Takauji |
| Erik Magnusson | 1339–1359 | Magnus Eriksson of Norway | Renounced rights to become King of Sweden, with his brother Haakon VI taking the throne of Norway |
| Baw Ngan-Mohn | 1370–1390 | Binnya U | Imprisoned |
| Grand Prince Yangnyeong | 1394–1462 | Taejong of Joseon | Removed due to an affair |
| Vladislaus Jagiellon | 1456–1516 | Casimir IV Jagiellon of Poland-Lithuania | Renounced rights after being elected King of Bohemia, with his brother Alexander Jagiellon taking the throne of Poland-Lithuania |
| Dmitry Ivanovich | 1483–1509 | Ivan III of Russia | Disinherited in favor of uncle Vasili III of Russia |
| Carlos, Prince of Asturias | 1545–1568 | Philip II of Spain | Arrested and imprisoned by his father; died in prison six months later |
| Minye Kyawswa II of Ava | 1567–1599 | Nanda Bayin | Defected |
| Cuyen | 1580–1615 | Nurhaci | Political conflict with his father; replaced by his brother Hong Taiji |
| Yinreng | 1674–1725 | The Kangxi Emperor | Demoted and Imprisoned for life by Kangxi for immorality and treason; replaced by his brother Yinzhen |
| Alexei Petrovich, Tsarevich of Russia | 1690–1718 | Peter the Great of Russia | Imprisoned by his father and forced to relinquish his claim in favor of his half-brother Peter Petrovich. Died in prison. |
| Philip, Duke of Calabria | 1747–1777 | Charles III of Spain | Intellectually disabled; removed from the line of succession in favor of his brothers Charles and Ferdinand, who took the thrones of Spain and Naples and Sicily, respectively |
| Louis, Prince of Piacenza | 1773–1803 | Ferdinand I, Duke of Parma | The Treaty of Aranjuez forced Ferdinand to relinquish the Duchy of Parma to France upon his death. Louis was compensated by being made King of Etruria. |
| Pedro, Prince Imperial of Brazil | 1825–1891 | Pedro IV of Portugal | Became heir solely to Brazil, with his sister Maria becoming heir presumptive to Portugal |
| Mustafa Fazıl Pasha | 1830–1875 | Isma'il Pasha | Succession law changed to pass from father to son instead of brother to brother; replaced by Tewfik Pasha |
| Tengku Alam Shah | 1846–1891 | Sultan Ali of Johor | Throne given instead to kinsman Abu Bakar of Johor, who was aided by the British |
| Khalifa bin Zayed bin Khalifa Al Nahyan | c.1856–? | Zayed bin Khalifa Al Nahyan | Refused throne, with his brother Tahnoun bin Zayed bin Khalifa Al Nahyan becoming ruler instead |
| George, Crown Prince of Serbia | 1887–1972 | Peter I of Serbia | Abdicated his succession rights in 1909; replaced by his brother Alexander |
| Muhammad of Saudi Arabia | 1910–1988 | King Faisal ibn Abdul-Aziz | Forced to abdicate in 1965; replaced by his brother Khalid |
| Abdullah Mubarak Al-Sabah | 1914–1991 | Abdullah Al-Salim Al-Sabah | Resigned as Vice Ruler in 1961 |
| Tunku Abdul Rahman of Johor | 1933–1989 | Ismail of Johor | His elder brother Iskandar of Johor was reinstated after previously being forced to renounce his rights |
| Khalid bin Saqr Al Qasimi | Born 1940 | Saqr bin Mohammed Al Qasimi | Disinherited in favor of his half-brother Saud bin Saqr Al Qasimi |
| Muqrin of Saudi Arabia | Born 1945 | King Salman bin Abdulaziz Al Saud | Removed as Crown Prince in April 2015; replaced by his nephew Muhammad bin Nayef |
| Hassan of Jordan | Born 1947 | King Hussein of Jordan | He was replaced by his nephew Abdullah only days before the king died in 1999 |
| Muhammad bin Nayef of Saudi Arabia | Born 1959 | King Salman bin Abdulaziz Al Saud | Removed as Crown Prince in June 2017; replaced by his cousin Mohammad bin Salman |
| Mishaal bin Hamad bin Khalifa Al Thani | Born 1972 | Hamad bin Khalifa Al Thani | Renounced his claim in 1996 in favor of his younger half-brother, Sheikh Jasim |
| Jassim bin Hamad bin Khalifa Al Thani | Born 1978 | Hamad bin Khalifa Al Thani | Renounced his claim in 2003 in favor of his younger brother, Sheikh Tamim |
| Prince Carl Philip of Sweden | Born 1979 | Carl XVI Gustaf of Sweden | Swedish succession laws were changed in 1980. Carl Philip was supplanted by his elder sister Victoria, who had previously been heir presumptive before Carl Philip's birth |
| Prince Hamzah of Jordan | Born 1980 | Abdullah II of Jordan | Title of Crown Prince removed in 2004. Hamzah was supplanted by his half-nephew Hussein |

=== Heirs apparent of monarchs who themselves abdicated or were deposed ===
| Heir apparent | Lived | Heir to | End of line/monarchy |
|---|---|---|---|
| Lucius Calpurnius Piso Licinianus | 38–69 | Galba, Roman emperor | Assassinated in 69 under orders of Otho |
| Pertinax the Younger | 180–212 | Pertinax, Roman Emperor | Pertinax killed by Praetorian Guard in 193, but son was spared |
| Gaius Julius Verus Maximus | 217–238 | Maximinus Thrax, Roman emperor | Assassinated in 238 |
| Publius Licinius Egnatius Marinianus | 249–268 | Gallienus, Roman emperor | Killed in 268 |
| Licinius II | 315–326 | Licinius, Roman emperor | Both father and son were executed by Licinius' co-emperor Constantine the Great |
| Victor | Died 388 | Magnus Maximus, Western Roman emperor | Both executed |
| Constans II | Died 411 | Constantine III (Western Roman emperor) | Both killed in revolts |
| Palladius | 415/425–455 | Petronius Maximus | Both killed by an angry mob |
| Chen Yin | 573–618 | Chen Shubao | Chen dynasty fell |
| Theodosius | 583/585–602 | Maurice (Eastern Roman emperor) | Both father and son executed by supporters of Phocas |
| Niketas the Persian | Died 636 | Shahrbaraz (Sassanian Empire) | Shahrbaraz was killed after 40 days of rule |
| Tiberius IV | 705–711 | Justinian II | Both father and son overthrown and executed |
| Theophylact | 793–849 | Michael I Rangabe | Michael I abdicated in the face of a military revolt |
| Constantine | 800 and 810–? | Leo V the Armenian | Leo V was assassinated and his heirs banished |
| Crown Prince Maui | 912–? | Gyeongsun of Silla | Gyeongsun surrendered his throne to Taejo of Goryeo |
| Meng Xuanzhe | 937–991 | Meng Chang | Later Shu was defeated by the Song dynasty |
| William fitz Duncan | 1090–1147 | Duncan II of Scotland | Duncan II was killed in battle in 1094 and his uncle Donald III retook the throne |
| Daoud ibn al-Adid | Died 1207 | Al-Adid | The Ayyubid dynasty took power |
| Edward Balliol | 1283–1367 | John Balliol (king of Scotland) | Abdicated following defeat in First War of Scottish Independence |
| Crown Prince Jeongseong | Died 1394 | Gongyang of Goryeo | Father and son were exiled and assassinated |
| Zhu Wenkui | Disappeared in 1402 | Jianwen Emperor | Prince Yan sacked Nanjing. Disappeared with his father Jianwen Emperor. |
| Ferdinand, Duke of Calabria | 1488–1550 | Frederick of Naples | Frederick was deposed in 1501 by Louis XII and Ferdinand II of Aragon |
| Deposed Crown Prince Yi Hwang | 1498–1506 | Yeonsangun of Joseon | Yeonsangun was deposed in 1506 in favor of his half-brother Jungjong of Joseon |
| John of Denmark | 1518–1532 | Christian II of Denmark | Christian II was deposed in 1523 in favor of his uncle Frederick I |
| Gustav of Sweden | 1568–1607 | Erik XIV of Sweden | Erik XIV was deposed in 1568 in favor of his half-brother John III |
| Gustav of Saxe-Lauenburg | 1570–1597 | Magnus II, Duke of Saxe-Lauenburg | Magnus' father Francis I, Duke of Saxe-Lauenburg reascended |
| Władysław Vasa | 1595–1648 | Sigismund of Sweden | Sigismund was deposed in 1599 in favor of his uncle Charles IX |
| Deposed Crown Prince Yi Ji | 1598–1623 | Gwanghaegun of Joseon | Gwanghaegun was deposed in 1623 in favor of his nephew Injo of Joseon |
| Zhu Cilang | 1629–1644 | Chongzhen Emperor | Ming conquered by Manchu and founded the Qing dynasty |
| James Francis Edward Stuart | 1688–1766 | James II of England | James II was deposed in favor of his daughter and son-in-law Mary II and William III and II on 11 April 1689 for being Catholic |
| Emich Karl, Hereditary Prince of Leiningen | 1763–1814 | Karl Friedrich Wilhelm, Prince of Leiningen | German mediatisation |
| Prince David of Georgia | 1767–1819 | George XII of Georgia | Annexation by Russia |
| Franz Joseph, Hereditary Prince of Dietrichstein | 1767–1854 | Karl Johann Baptist, Prince of Dietrichstein | German mediatisation |
| Henry, Hereditary Count of Stolberg-Wernigerode | 1772–1854 | Christian Frederick, Count of Stolberg-Wernigerode | German mediatisation |
| Louis-Antoine, Dauphin and Duke of Angoulême | 1775–1844 | Charles X of France | Abdicated jointly with his father on 2 August 1830 |
| Alexius, Hereditary Count of Bentheim and Steinfurt | 1781–1866 | Louis William Geldricus Ernest, Prince of Bentheim and Steinfurt | German mediatisation |
| Charles Thomas, Hereditary Prince of Löwenstein-Wertheim-Rochefort | 1783–1849 | Dominic Constantine, Prince of Löwenstein-Wertheim-Rochefort | German mediatisation |
| Louis-Charles, Dauphin of France | 1785–1795 | Louis XVI | French Revolution |
| Duke Pius August in Bavaria | 1786–1837 | Wilhelm, Count Palatine of Birkenfeld-Gelnhausen | Annexation by Bavaria |
| Prince Constantine of Imereti | 1789–1844 | Solomon II of Imereti | Annexation by Russia |
| Ernst, Hereditary Prince of Hohenlohe-Langenburg | 1794–1860 | Karl Ludwig, Prince of Hohenlohe-Langenburg | German mediatisation |
| Gustav, Prince of Vasa | 1799–1877 | Gustav IV Adolf of Sweden | Gustav's whole family was excluded from the line of royal succession on 10 May 1809 by the Riksdag of the Estates, after the deposition of Gustav IV Adolf in favor of his uncle Charles XIII |
| Maximilian Karl, Hereditary Prince of Thurn and Taxis | 1802–1871 | Karl Alexander, 5th Prince of Thurn and Taxis | German mediatisation |
| Jacques-Victor Henry | 1804–1820 | Henri Christophe (Haiti) | Fearing a coup, Henri Christophe committed suicide and Jacques-Victor Henry was assassinated |
| Agustín Jerónimo, Prince Imperial of Mexico | 1807–1866 | Agustín I of Mexico | Deposed in 1823 |
| Auguste de Beauharnais | 1810–1835 | Eugène de Beauharnais, Grand Duke of Frankfurt | Frankfurt again became a free city |
| Charles, Hereditary Prince of Lucca | 1823–1854 | Charles I, Duke of Lucca | Charles I renounced the Duchy to the Grand Duchy of Tuscany, shortly before he acceded to the throne of his ancestral land of Parma, per the stipulations of the Congress of Vienna, upon the death of Marie Louise, Duchess of Parma |
| Leopold, Prince of Hohenzollern | 1835–1905 | Karl Anton, Prince of Hohenzollern | Annexed by Prussia on 7 December 1849 |
| Prince Philippe, Count of Paris | 1838–1894 | Louis Philippe I of France | Declaration of the Second Republic on 24 February 1848 |
| Ernest Augustus, Crown Prince of Hanover | 1845–1923 | George V of Hanover | Annexation by Prussia in 1866 |
| Ernest, Landgrave of Hesse-Philippsthal | 1846–1925 | Charles II, Landgrave of Hesse-Philippsthal | Annexation by Prussia in 1866 |
| Isabel, Princess Imperial of Brazil | 1846-1921 | Pedro II of Brazil | Pedro II was deposed in 1889 by Coup of the Republic |
| Marama Teururai | 1851–1909 | Ari'imate | Ari'imate was deposed in 1868 in favor of his wife Tehaapapa II |
| William, Hereditary Prince of Nassau | 1852–1912 | Adolphe, Duke of Nassau | Annexation by Prussia in 1866 |
| Louis Napoléon, Prince Imperial | 1856–1879 | Napoleon III of France | Napoleon III was deposed 4 September 1870 by the forces of the Third Republic |
| Crown Prince Gustaf of Norway | 1858–1950 | Oscar II of Norway | Dissolution of the union between Norway and Sweden in 1905 |
| Agustín, Prince of Iturbide | 1863–1925 | Maximilian I of Mexico | Monarchy abolished in 1867 |
| Shō Ten | 1864–1920 | Shō Tai | Ryukyu Kingdom was annexed by Japan in 1872 |
| Abdulmejid II | 1868–1944 | Mehmed VI | Ottoman Empire dissolved in 1922. |
| Teriivaetua | 1869–1918 | Pōmare V | Tahiti was annexed by France in 1880 |
| Prince Emanuele Filiberto, Duke of Aosta | 1869–1931 | Amadeo I of Spain | Abdicated in 1873 |
| Rupprecht, Crown Prince of Bavaria | 1869–1955 | Ludwig III of Bavaria | German monarchies abolished in November 1918 |
| Danilo, Crown Prince of Montenegro | 1871–1939 | Nicholas I of Montenegro | Annexed by Serbia |
| Kaʻiulani | 1875–1899 | Liliʻuokalani | Annexation by the United States |
| Yuan Keding | 1878–1958 | Yuan Shikai | Short lived Empire abolished in March 1916 |
| Wilhelm, German Crown Prince | 1882–1951 | Wilhelm II, German Emperor | Wilhelm was deposed by the German government on 9 November 1918 |
| Georg, Crown Prince of Saxony | 1893–1943 | Frederick Augustus III of Saxony | German monarchies abolished in November 1918 |
| Husain Bey, Crown Prince of Tunisia | 1893–1969 | Muhammad VIII al-Amin | Deposed in 1957 |
| Heinrich XLV, Hereditary Prince Reuss Younger Line | 1895–1945 | Heinrich XXVII, Prince Reuss Younger Line | German monarchies abolished in November 1918 |
| Josias, Hereditary Prince of Waldeck and Pyrmont | 1896–1967 | Friedrich, Prince of Waldeck and Pyrmont | German monarchies abolished in November 1918 |
| Wolfgang, Crown Prince of Finland | 1896–1989 | Fredrik Kaarle, King-elect of Finland | Monarchy abolished in 1918 |
| Prince Wilhelm of Urach | 1897–1957 | Mindaugas II of Lithuania | Monarchy abolished in 1918 |
| Yi Un | 1897–1970 | Sunjong of Korea | Annexation by Korea in 1910 |
| Nikolaus, Hereditary Grand Duke of Oldenburg | 1897–1970 | Frederick Augustus II, Grand Duke of Oldenburg | German monarchies abolished in November 1918 |
| Crown Prince Friðrik of Iceland | 1899–1972 | Kristján X of Iceland | Monarchy abolished on 17 June 1944 |
| Muhammad Abdel Moneim | 1899–1979 | Abbas II of Egypt | Abbas II was deposed by the British for supporting the Ottomans in World War I |
| Georg Moritz, Hereditary Prince of Saxe-Altenburg | 1900–1991 | Ernst II, Duke of Saxe-Altenburg | German monarchies abolished in November 1918 |
| Ernst, Hereditary Prince of Lippe | 1902–1987 | Leopold IV, Prince of Lippe | German monarchies abolished in November 1918 |
| Alexei Nikolaevich, Tsarevich of Russia | 1904–1918 | Nicholas II | Nicholas abdicated on 2/15 March 1917 on behalf of both himself and his son. The monarchy was abolished 1 September 1917 |
| Umberto, Prince of Piedmont | 1904–1983 | Victor Emmanuel III of Ethiopia and Albania | Victor Emmanuel was only partially recognised in those countries, renounced claims in 1943 in favor of previous holders |
| Georg Donatus, Hereditary Grand Duke of Hesse | 1906–1937 | Ernest Louis, Grand Duke of Hesse | German monarchies abolished in November 1918 |
| Johann Leopold, Hereditary Prince of Saxe-Coburg and Gotha | 1906–1972 | Charles Edward, Duke of Saxe-Coburg and Gotha | German monarchies abolished in November 1918 |
| Alfonso, Prince of Asturias | 1907–1938 | Alfonso XIII of Spain | Alfonso XIII was deposed by the formation of the Second Spanish Republic on April 14, 1931. Prince Alfonso renounced his claim on 21 June 1933 so he could marry a commoner |
| Friedrich Franz, Hereditary Grand Duke of Mecklenburg-Schwerin | 1910–2001 | Frederick Francis IV, Grand Duke of Mecklenburg-Schwerin | German monarchies abolished in November 1918 |
| Ghazi bin Faisal | 1912–1939 | Faisal I of Syria | Deposed in 1920 |
| Charles Augustus, Hereditary Grand Duke of Saxe-Weimar-Eisenach | 1912–1988 | William Ernest, Grand Duke of Saxe-Weimar-Eisenach | German monarchies abolished in November 1918 |
| Archduke Otto, Crown Prince of Austria, Hungary, Croatia and Bohemia | 1912–2011 | Charles I of Austria | Austria and Hungary abolished the monarchy in 1918. |
| Abd al-Ilah | 1913–1958 | Ali of Hejaz | Deposed in 1925 |
| Carol Victor, Hereditary Prince of Albania | 1913–1973 | Wilhelm, Prince of Albania | Fled into exile in 1914 |
| Prince Ernest Augustus of Hanover | 1914–1987 | Ernest Augustus, Duke of Brunswick | German monarchies abolished in November 1918 |
| Amha Selassie | 1916–1997 | Haile Selassie of Ethiopia | Haile Selassie was overthrown in 1974 after being taken by communist Derg power |
| Hasan as-Senussi | 1928–1992 | Idris of Libya | Deposed in 1969 |
| Vong Savang | 1931–1978 | Sisavang Vatthana | Monarchy abolished after Laotian Civil War |
| Ahmad Shah Khan, Crown Prince of Afghanistan | 1934–2024 | Mohammed Zahir Shah | Deposed in 1973 |
| Bảo Long | 1936–2007 | Bảo Đại | 1955 State of Vietnam referendum |
| Vittorio Emanuele, Prince of Naples | 1937–2024 | Umberto II of Italy | Italy abolished the monarchy on 12 June 1946, after Umberto II had reigned 33 days |
| Leka, Crown Prince of Albania | 1939–2011 | Zog of Albania | Two days after Leka's birth, Mussolini's Italy invaded Albania on 7 April 1939 and sent the royal family into exile |
| Crown Prince Amedeo of Savoy, Duke of Apulia | 1943–2021 | Tomislav II of Croatia | Tomislav II abdicated October 12, 1943 due to the Armistice between Italy and Allied armed forces, when Amedeo was only two weeks old |
| Alexander, Crown Prince of Yugoslavia | Born 1945 | Peter II of Yugoslavia | Peter II was deposed by Yugoslavia's Constituent Assembly on 29 November 1945 |
| Abdelaziz bin Ahmed Al Thani | 1946–2008 | Ahmad bin Ali Al Thani | Deposed in 1972; Khalifa bin Hamad Al Thani took the throne |
| Charles, Prince of Wales | Born 1948 | Elizabeth II of Pakistan, Ghana, South Africa, Tanganyika, Nigeria, Uganda, Kenya, Malawi, Guyana, The Gambia, Sierra Leone, Ceylon, Malta, Trinidad and Tobago, Fiji, Mauritius, and Barbados | Countries became republics (in order mentioned) |
| Reza Pahlavi, Crown Prince of Iran | Born 1960 | Mohammad Reza Pahlavi | The Shah was overthrown by the Iranian Revolution on 11 February 1979 |
| Pavlos, Crown Prince of Greece | Born 1967 | Constantine II of Greece | Constantine II fled into exile shortly after Pavlos's birth, and the monarchy was abolished 1 June 1973 |
| Paras, Crown Prince of Nepal | Born 1971 | Gyanendra of Nepal | Gyanendra was deposed 28 May 2008 in favour of a republican government |
| Jean-Bédel Bokassa, Crown Prince of the Central African Empire | Born 1973 | Jean-Bédel Bokassa | Deposed in 1979 |

== See also ==
- List of heirs apparent
- President-elect
- Prime minister-designate
- Heads of former ruling families

== Notes and references ==
=== Sources ===
- Fields, Philip M., ed. (1987). The History of al-Ṭabarī, Volume XXXVII: The ʿAbbāsid Recovery: The War Against the Zanj Ends, A.D. 879–893/A.H. 266–279. SUNY Series in Near Eastern Studies. Albany, New York: State University of New York Press. ISBN 978-0-88706-054-0.
- Kennedy, Hugh N. (1993). "al-Muʿtamid ʿAlā 'llāh". In Bosworth, C. E.; van Donzel, E.; Heinrichs, W. P. & Pellat, Ch. (eds.). The Encyclopaedia of Islam, Second Edition. Volume VII: Mif–Naz. Leiden: E. J. Brill. pp. 765–766. ISBN 978-90-04-09419-2.
