= Duke Shen of Chen =

Duke Shen of Chen or Chen Shen Gong may refer to:

- Duke Shēn of Chen (陳申公), the second ruler of Chen
- Duke Shèn of Chen (陳慎公), the fifth ruler of Chen
