= Duke Zhuang of Chen =

Ruler of Chen from 699 to 693 BC

Duke Zhuang of Chen 陳莊公

15th ruler of Chen
- Reign: 699–693 BC
- Predecessor: Duke Li of Chen
- Successor: Duke Xuan of Chen
- Died: 693 BC
Names
- Gui Lin (媯林)
Posthumous name
- Duke Zhuang (莊公)
- House: Gui
- Dynasty: Chen
- Father: Duke Huan of Chen

Duke Zhuang of Chen (Chinese: 陳莊公; pinyin: Chén Zhuāng Gōng; reigned 699 BC – died 693 BC), personal name Gui Lin, was a duke of the Chen state.

Duke Zhuang was a middle son of Duke Huan, whose brother Chen Tuo murdered Lin's eldest brother Crown Prince Mian and usurped the throne in 707 BC. The army of the neighbouring Cai state killed Chen Tuo in 706 BC and installed Duke Li, another brother of Duke Zhuang, on the throne.

Duke Li reigned for seven years and died in 700 BC and was succeeded by his brother Duke Zhuang instead of his son Chen Wan (陳完).

In 698 BC, the Chen state joined the armies of Song, Qi, Cai, and Wey to attack the Zheng state. The Song state led the attack, to avenge an earlier attack on Song by Zheng. The allied forces burned the Qu gate of the Zheng capital and entered the city. In 697 and 696 BC, Chen and other states attacked Zheng two more times.

Duke Zhuang died in 693 BC, after a reign of seven years. He was also succeeded by his younger brother, Chujiu (Duke Xuan).

== Bibliography ==
- Han, Zhaoqi, ed. (2010). "Houses of Chen and Qi". Shiji 史记 (in Chinese). Beijing: Zhonghua Book Company. ISBN 978-7-101-07272-3.
- Yang, Bojun, ed. (2009). 春秋左传注 [Annotated Chunqiu Zuozhuan] (in Chinese) (3rd revised ed.). Beijing: Zhonghua Book Company. ISBN 978-7-101-07074-3.
