= Duke Xuan of Chen =

Ruler of Chen from 692 to 648 BC

Duke Xuan of Chen 陳宣公

16th ruler of Chen
- Reign: 692–648 BC
- Predecessor: Duke Zhuang of Chen
- Successor: Duke Mu of Chen
- Died: 648 BC
- Issue: Yukou; Duke Mu of Chen
Names
- Gui Chujiu (媯杵臼)
Posthumous name
- Duke Xuan (宣公)
- House: Gui
- Dynasty: Chen
- Father: Duke Huan of Chen

Duke Xuan of Chen (Chinese: 陳宣公; pinyin: Chén Xuān Gōng; reigned 692 BC – died 648 BC), personal name Gui Chujiu, was a ruler of the Chen state.

== Accession to the throne ==
Duke Xuan was a younger son of Duke Huan, whose brother Chen Tuo murdered Duke Xuan's eldest brother Crown Prince Mian and usurped the throne in 707 BC. The army of the neighbouring Cai state killed Chen Tuo in 706 BC and installed Duke Li, another brother of Duke Xuan, on the Chen throne.

Duke Li reigned for seven years and died in 700 BC. However, it was his younger brother Lin (Duke Zhuang) who succeeded him, instead of his son Chen Wan (陳完). After Duke Zhuang's death in 693 BC, Duke Xuan succeeded his brother as ruler of Chen.

== Reign ==
In 689 BC, Chen, together with the states of Lu, Song, and Cai, joined the major state of Qi to attack the state of Wey, in order to restore Duke Hui of Wey to the throne.

In 676 BC, King Hui of Zhou married a princess of Chen, who became known as Queen Hui of Zhou.

Duke Xuan's original heir apparent was Crown Prince Yukou. However, in 672 BC, the 21st year of his reign, Duke Xuan's favourite concubine gave birth to a son named Kuan. Duke Xuan killed Yukou and made Kuan his new heir apparent. Yukou was close to Duke Li's son Chen Wan. Afraid that his life was also in danger, Chen Wan fled to the State of Qi in the northeast. Duke Huan of Qi made Chen Wan an official in charge of manufacturing, and Chen Wan established the Chen (later known as Tian) clan in Qi. The Chen clan of Qi would grow increasingly powerful over the centuries, and eventually usurped the Qi throne.

In 656 BC, the hegemon Duke Huan of Qi led an alliance of eight states to attack the states of Cai and Chu in the south. Chen was part of the alliance. The allied forces routed Cai, but returned without fighting the Chu. The Qi army needed to cross Chen territory on its way home. Yuan Taotu, a minister of Chen, was worried that the Qi army would demand resources from Chen and suggested to Duke Huan that the army take an eastern route through the Dongyi territory. Duke Huan agreed, but later discovered his intent and arrested him. Qi then proceeded to attack Chen as punishment.

Duke Xuan reigned for 45 years and died in 648 BC. He was succeeded by his son Kuan, posthumously known as Duke Mu of Chen.

== Bibliography ==
- Han, Zhaoqi, ed. (2010). "Houses of Chen and Qi". Shiji 史记 (in Chinese). Beijing: Zhonghua Book Company. ISBN 978-7-101-07272-3.
- Yang, Bojun, ed. (2009). 春秋左传注 [Annotated Chunqiu Zuozhuan] (in Chinese) (3rd revised ed.). Beijing: Zhonghua Book Company. ISBN 978-7-101-07074-3.
