= Yukou =

Heir to Duke Xuan of Chen

Crown Prince Yukou (Chinese: 禦寇; pinyin: Yùkòu; died 672 BC) was the original heir apparent of Duke Xuan of Chen, the sixteenth ruler of the ancient Chinese state of Chen during the Spring and Autumn period. In 672 BC, the 21st year of his reign, Duke Xuan's favourite concubine gave birth to a son named Kuan. Duke Xuan killed Yukou and made Kuan his new heir apparent.

Prince Yukou was close to his cousin Chen Wan, son of Duke Li of Chen, the fifteenth ruler of Chen and Yukou's uncle. Afraid that his life was also in danger, Chen Wan fled to the State of Qi in the northeast. Duke Huan of Qi made Chen Wan an official in charge of manufacturing, and Chen Wan established the Chen (later known as Tian) clan in Qi. The Chen clan of Qi would grow increasingly powerful over the centuries and eventually usurped the Qi throne.

== See also ==
- Crown Prince Mian

== Bibliography ==
- Han, Zhaoqi, ed. (2010). "Houses of Chen and Qi". Shiji 史记 (in Chinese). Beijing: Zhonghua Book Company. ISBN 978-7-101-07272-3.
- Yang, Bojun, ed. (2009). 春秋左传注 [Annotated Chunqiu Zuozhuan] (in Chinese) (3rd revised ed.). Beijing: Zhonghua Book Company. ISBN 978-7-101-07074-3.
