= Duke Xiao of Chen =

Duke Xiao of Chen 陳孝公

4th ruler of Chen
- Reign: 10th century BC
- Predecessor: Duke Xiang of Chen (uncle)
- Successor: Duke Shèn of Chen (son)
- Issue: Duke Shèn of Chen (陳慎公)
Names
- Gui Tu (媯突)
Posthumous name
- Duke Xiao (孝公)
- House: Gui
- Dynasty: Chen
- Father: Duke Shēn of Chen (陳申公)

Duke Xiao of Chen (Chinese: 陳孝公; pinyin: Chén Xiào Gōng; reigned 10th century BC), personal name Gui Tu, was the fourth ruler of the Chen state. He was the grandson of the state's founder Duke Hu of Chen, who married the eldest daughter of King Wu of Zhou.

Duke Xiao was the son of Duke Shēn of Chen (陳申公), the second ruler of Chen. When Duke Shēn died, the throne passed to his younger brother Gaoyang, Duke Xiang of Chen, instead of his son Tu. However, Duke Xiao ascended the throne after the death of his uncle Duke Xiang. Duke Xiao was succeeded by his son Yurong, known as Duke Shèn of Chen (陳慎公).

== Bibliography ==
- Han, Zhaoqi, ed. (2010). "Houses of Chen and Qi". Shiji 史记 (in Chinese). Zhonghua Book Company. ISBN 978-7-101-07272-3.
- Yang, Kuan (2003). Xi Zhou Shi 西周史 [History of the Western Zhou] (in Chinese). Shanghai People's Publishing House. ISBN 978-7-208-04538-5.
