= Chen Guo =

Chen Guo may refer to:

- Chen (state) (Chinese: 陳國; pinyin: Chén Guó), a vassal state of ancient China's Zhou dynasty
- Fruit Chan (Chinese: 陳果; pinyin: Chén Guǒ; born 1959), Hong Kong film director
