= Duke Gong of Chen =

Duke Gong of Chen 陳共公

18th ruler of Chen
- Reign: 631–614 BC
- Predecessor: Duke Mu of Chen
- Successor: Duke Ling of Chen (陳靈公）
- Died: 614 BC
- Issue: Duke Ling of Chen
Names
- Gui Shuo (媯朔)
Posthumous name
- Duke Gong (共公)
- House: Gui
- Dynasty: Chen
- Father: Duke Mu of Chen

Duke Gong of Chen (Chinese: 陳共公; pinyin: Chén Gòng Gōng; reigned 631 BC – died 614 BC), personal name Gui Shuo, was a duke of the Chen state.

Duke Gong succeeded his father Duke Mu, who died in 632 BC after 16 years of reign. He reigned for 18 years and died in 614 BC. He was succeeded by his son Pingguo, known posthumously as Duke Ling of Chen (陳靈公).

== Bibliography ==
- Han, Zhaoqi, ed. (2010). "Houses of Chen and Qi". Shiji 史记 (in Chinese). Beijing: Zhonghua Book Company. ISBN 978-7-101-07272-3.
- Yang, Bojun, ed. (2009). 春秋左传注 [Annotated Chunqiu Zuozhuan] (in Chinese) (3rd revised ed.). Beijing: Zhonghua Book Company. ISBN 978-7-101-07074-3.
