= Xiang Gong =

Xiang Gong may refer to:

- Xiang Gong or Aromatic Qigong
- Duke Xiang (disambiguation)
- Xiang Gong, a history area in Bangkok's Chinatown
