= Crown Prince Mian =

Eldest son of 8th-century BC Duke Huan of Chen

Crown Prince Mian (Chinese: 太子免; pinyin: Tàizǐ Miǎn; died 707 BC) was the eldest son and designated successor of Duke Huan of Chen, the twelfth ruler of the ancient Chinese state of Chen during the early Spring and Autumn period. His given name was Mian (免).

In the first month of 707 BC, Prince Mian's father Duke Huan died under strange circumstances. He was believed to have become demented, and went missing for sixteen days before his body was found. In the chaos that ensued, Prince Mian was murdered by his uncle Chen Tuo, the younger brother of Duke Huan. Chen Tuo usurped the throne to become the thirteenth ruler of Chen.

Prince Mian had a younger brother named Yue, whose mother was a princess of the neighbouring State of Cai. After Chen Tuo's usurpation, the Cai army attacked and killed Chen Tuo in the eighth month of 706 BC. The marquis of Cai then installed Yue on the Chen throne, to be known as Duke Li of Chen. After Duke Li died, he was succeeded by two younger brothers: Lin, Duke Zhuang of Chen, and Chujiu, Duke Xuan of Chen.

== See also ==
- Crown Prince Yukou

== Bibliography ==
- Han, Zhaoqi, ed. (2010). "Houses of Chen and Qi". Shiji 史记 (in Chinese). Beijing: Zhonghua Book Company. ISBN 978-7-101-07272-3.
- Yang, Bojun, ed. (2009). 春秋左传注 [Annotated Chunqiu Zuozhuan] (in Chinese) (3rd revised ed.). Beijing: Zhonghua Book Company. ISBN 978-7-101-07074-3.
