= Duke You of Chen =

Duke You of Chen 陳幽公

6th ruler of Chen
- Reign: 854–832 BC
- Predecessor: Duke Shèn of Chen
- Successor: Duke Xi of Chen
- Died: 832 BC
- Issue: Duke Xi of Chen
Names
- Gui Ning (媯寧)
Posthumous name
- Duke You (幽公)
- House: Gui
- Dynasty: Chen
- Father: Duke Shèn of Chen

Duke You of Chen (Chinese: 陳幽公; pinyin: Chén Yōu Gōng; reigned 854 BC – died 832 BC), personal name Gui Ning, was a duke of the Chen state.

Duke You succeeded his father Duke Shèn, who died in 855 BC. He died in 832 BC, the tenth year of the Gonghe Regency, after a reign of 23 years. He was succeeded by his son, Xiao (Duke Xi).

== Bibliography ==
- Han, Zhaoqi, ed. (2010). "Houses of Chen and Qi". Shiji 史记 (in Chinese). Zhonghua Book Company. ISBN 978-7-101-07272-3.
