= King Xiang =

King Xiang may refer to these rulers of ancient China:

- Xiang of Xia (3rd millennium BC), possibly a ruler of the Xia dynasty
- King Xiang of Zhou (died 619 BC)
- King Xiang of Han (died 296 BC)
- King Xiang of Wei (died 296 BC)
- King Xiang of Qi (died 265 BC)

== See also ==
- Duke Xiang (disambiguation)
