= Duke Ping of Chen =

Ruler of Chen from 777 to 755 BC

Duke Ping of Chen 陳平公

10th ruler of Chen
- Reign: 777–755 BC
- Predecessor: Duke Yi of Chen (brother)
- Successor: Duke Wen of Chen (son)
- Died: 755 BC
- Issue: Duke Wen of Chen
Names
- Gui Xie (媯燮)
Posthumous name
- Duke Ping (平公)
- House: Gui
- Dynasty: Chen
- Father: Duke Wu of Chen

Duke Ping of Chen (Chinese: 陳平公; pinyin: Chén Píng Gōng; reigned 777 BC – died 755 BC), personal name Gui Xie, was a duke of the Chen state.

Duke Ping was a younger son of Duke Wu, who died in 781 BC and was succeeded by his elder son Duke Yi. However, Duke Yi died in 778 BC after only three years of reign, and Duke Ping succeeded his elder brother as the ruler of Chen.

In 771 BC, the seventh year of Duke Ping's reign, the Western Zhou dynasty collapsed after the Quanrong nomads killed King You of Zhou and occupied the Zhou heartland, forcing the Zhou royal court to move east to Luoyang. Duke Ping reigned for 23 years and died in 755 BC. He was succeeded by his son, Yu (Duke Wen).

== Bibliography ==
- Han, Zhaoqi, ed. (2010). "Houses of Chen and Qi". Shiji 史记 (in Chinese). Zhonghua Book Company. ISBN 978-7-101-07272-3.
