= Duke Xiang =

Duke Xiang may refer to these rulers from ancient China:

- Duke Xiang of Chen (fl. 10th century BC)
- Duke Xiang of Qin (died 766 BC)
- Duke Xiang of Qi (died 686 BC)
- Duke Xiang of Song (died 637 BC)
- Duke Xiang of Jin (died 621 BC)

== See also ==
- King Xiang (disambiguation)
