= Duke Xi of Chen =

Duke Xi of Chen 陳僖公

7th ruler of Chen
- Reign: 831–796 BC
- Predecessor: Duke You of Chen
- Successor: Duke Wu of Chen
- Died: 796 BC
- Issue: Duke Wu of Chen
Names
- Gui Xiao (媯孝)
Posthumous name
- Duke Xi (僖公)
- House: Gui
- Dynasty: Chen
- Father: Duke You of Chen

Duke Xi of Chen (Chinese: 陳僖公; died 796 BC), personal name Gui Xiao, was a duke of the Chen state. He succeeded his father, Duke You, to the Chen throne.

== Life ==
Chen Xiao was the son of Ning, who was posthumously known as Duke You. Prince Xiao became duke of Chen upon his father's death in 832 BC.

He died in 796 BC and was posthumously honored under the name Chén Xīgōng. He was succeeded by his son Prince Ling, who was posthumously known as Duke Wu.
