= Duke Yi of Chen =

Duke Yi of Chen 陳夷公

9th ruler of Chen
- Reign: 780–778 BC
- Predecessor: Duke Wu of Chen (father)
- Successor: Duke Ping of Chen (brother)
- Died: 778 BC
Names
- Gui Yue (媯說)
Posthumous name
- Duke Yi (夷公)
- House: Gui
- Dynasty: Chen
- Father: Duke Wu of Chen

Duke Yi of Chen (Chinese: 陳夷公; pinyin: Chén Yí Gōng; reigned 780 BC – died 778 BC), personal name Gui Yue, was a duke of the Chen state.

Duke Yi succeeded his father Duke Wu of Chen, who died in 781 BC. Duke Yi's reign coincided with that of King You of Zhou, the last king of Western Zhou. Duke Yi died after only three years of reign, and was succeeded by his younger brother, Xie (Duke Ping of Chen).

== Bibliography ==
- Han, Zhaoqi, ed. (2010). "Houses of Chen and Qi". Shiji 史记 (in Chinese). Zhonghua Book Company. ISBN 978-7-101-07272-3.
