= Duke Wu of Chen =

Duke Wu of Chen 陳武公

8th ruler of Chen
- Reign: 795–781 BC
- Predecessor: Duke Xi of Chen
- Successor: Duke Yi of Chen
- Died: 781 BC
- Issue: Duke Yi of Chen; Duke Ping of Chen
Names
- Gui Ling (媯靈)
Posthumous name
- Duke Wu (武公)
- House: Gui
- Dynasty: Chen
- Father: Duke Xi of Chen

Duke Wu of Chen (Chinese: 陳武公; pinyin: Chén Wǔ Gōng; reigned 795 BC – died 781 BC), personal name Gui Ling, was a ruler of the Chen state.

Duke Wu succeeded his father Duke Xi of Chen, who died in 796 BC. He reigned for 15 years and died in 781 BC. Duke Wu was succeeded by his son, Yue (Duke Yi).

== Bibliography ==
- Han, Zhaoqi, ed. (2010). "Houses of Chen and Qi". Shiji 史记 (in Chinese). Zhonghua Book Company. ISBN 978-7-101-07272-3.
