= Duke Huan of Chen =

Ruler of Chen from 744 to 707 BC

Duke Huan of Chen 陳桓公

12th ruler of Chen
- Reign: 744–707 BC
- Predecessor: Duke Wen of Chen
- Successor: Chen Tuo
- Died: 707 BC
- Spouse: Princess of Cai
- Issue: Crown Prince Mian; Duke Li of Chen; Duke Zhuang of Chen; Duke Xuan of Chen
Names
- Gui Bao (媯鮑)
Posthumous name
- Duke Huan (桓公)
- House: Gui
- Dynasty: Chen
- Father: Duke Wen of Chen

Duke Huan of Chen (Chinese: 陳桓公; pinyin: Chén Huán Gōng; reigned 744 BC – died 707 BC), personal name Gui Bao, was a duke of the Chen state.

== Life and death ==
Duke Huan succeeded his father Duke Wen of Chen, who died in 745 BC. After a reign of 38 years, he died in 707 BC under strange circumstances. He was believed to have become demented and behaved erratically. He went missing on the jia-xu day in the first month of 707 BC. His body was found sixteen days later, on the ji-chou day. The exact date of his death was unknown.

== Chen Tuo's usurpation ==
The uncertainty of Duke Huan's death threw the state into turmoil. His younger brother Chen Tuo took the opportunity to murder Duke Huan's son Crown Prince Mian and usurp the throne.

Earlier in his life, Duke Huan had married a princess of the neighbouring state of Cai, who gave birth to a son named Yue. After Chen Tuo's usurpation, the Cai army attacked Chen and killed Chen Tuo in 706 BC. The marquis of Cai then installed Yue on the Chen throne, posthumously known as Duke Li of Chen. Duke Li died after a reign of seven years, and he was succeeded by two younger sons of Duke Huan: Lin, Duke Zhuang of Chen, and Chujiu, Duke Xuan of Chen.

== Family and legacy ==
Duke Zhuang of the state of Wey married two princesses of Chen, Li Gui and Dai Gui, who were probably sisters of Duke Huan. Dai Gui was the mother of Duke Huan of Wey.

Duke Huan was the grandfather of Chen Wan, who was the son of Duke Li. Chen Wan later fled to Qi, a major state to the northeast of Chen, and established the Chen (Tian) clan there. The Chen clan of Qi grew increasingly powerful over the centuries, and eventually usurped the Qi throne.

== Bibliography ==
- Han, Zhaoqi, ed. (2010). "Houses of Chen and Qi". Shiji 史记 (in Chinese). Beijing: Zhonghua Book Company. ISBN 978-7-101-07272-3.
- Yang, Bojun, ed. (2009). 春秋左传注 [Annotated Chunqiu Zuozhuan] (in Chinese) (3rd revised ed.). Beijing: Zhonghua Book Company. ISBN 978-7-101-07074-3.
