= Duke Shèn of Chen =

Duke Shen of Chen 陳慎公

5th ruler of Chen
- Reign: ? – 855 BC
- Predecessor: Duke Xiao of Chen
- Successor: Duke You of Chen
- Died: 855 BC
- Issue: Duke You of Chen
Names
- Gui Yurong (媯圉戎)
Posthumous name
- Duke Shen (慎公)
- House: Gui
- Dynasty: Chen
- Father: Duke Xiao of Chen

Duke Shen of Chen (Chinese: 陳慎公; pinyin: Chén Shèn Gōng; died 855 BC), personal name Gui Yurong, was a duke of the Chen state.

Duke Shèn succeeded his father Duke Xiao. He died in 855 BC and was succeeded by his son, Ning (Duke You).
