= Duke Xiang of Chen =

3rd ruler of Chen state

Duke Xiang of Chen 陳相公

3rd ruler of Chen
- Reign: 10th century BC
- Predecessor: Duke Shēn of Chen (brother)
- Successor: Duke Xiao of Chen (nephew)
Names
- Gui Gaoyang (媯皋羊)
Posthumous name
- Duke Xiang (相公)
- House: Gui
- Dynasty: Chen
- Father: Duke Hu of Chen

Duke Xiang of Chen (Chinese: 陳相公; pinyin: Chén Xiàng Gōng; reigned 10th century BC), personal name Gui Gaoyang, was the third duke of the Chen state. His father Duke Hu of Chen, who married the eldest daughter of King Wu of Zhou, was the founder of the Chen state.

Duke Xiang succeeded his elder brother, Duke Shēn of Chen, who was the second ruler of Chen. When Duke Xiang died, the throne returned to Duke Shēn's son Tu (Duke Xiao).

== Bibliography ==
- Han, Zhaoqi, ed. (2010). "Houses of Chen and Qi". Shiji 史记 (in Chinese). Zhonghua Book Company. ISBN 978-7-101-07272-3.
- Yang, Kuan (2003). Xi Zhou Shi 西周史 [History of the Western Zhou] (in Chinese). Shanghai People's Publishing House. ISBN 978-7-208-04538-5.
