= Duke Hu of Chen =

Founder of the Chen state

Duke Hu of Chen 陳胡公

1st ruler of Chen
- Reign: 1046/45 BC – ?
- Successor: Duke Shēn of Chen
- Spouse: Da Ji (大姬; daughter of King Wu of Zhou)
- Issue: Duke Shēn of Chen; Duke Xiang of Chen
Names
- Gui Man (媯滿)
Posthumous name
- Duke Hu (胡公) (by Chen state); King Hu (胡王) (by Xin dynasty)
Temple name
- Tongzu (統祖) (by Xin dynasty)
- House: Gui
- Dynasty: Chen
- Father: Efu (閼父)

Gui Man (Chinese: 媯滿, with "Man" being his given name and "Gui" being his ancestral temple surname; fl. 11th century BC), posthumous title Duke Hu of Chen (Chinese: 陈胡公 or 胡公满; Chinese: 陳胡公 or 胡公滿; pinyin: Chén Hú Gōng or Hu Gong Man), was the founder of the Chen state, a dynastic vassal state of the Zhou dynasty located in modern-day eastern Henan. His posthumous title was given by his father-in-law King Wu of Zhou.

During the Western Zhou, commoners began to be identified by their place of residence, which would go on to become their lineage surname. As the first ruler of Chen state, Duke Hu is therefore regarded as the originator of the surname Chen, one of the more prevalent family names in China, although he is not directly related as apical ancestor to many of the people who carry the name. After being granted the posthumous title of Duke Hu, his descendants began to use Hu as their surname. It was common during this time for descendants to take the posthumous title as their lineage surname, just as it was common, if not more so, to use a place name as a surname. Duke Hu of Chen is thus also considered a founding ancestor of those with the surname Hu. The rulers of the Hồ (Hu) dynasty of Vietnam claimed to be Duke Hu's descendants.

== Biography ==
Duke Hu was said to be a descendant of the legendary sage king Emperor Shun. His father Efu (閼父) served as taozheng (陶正), the official in charge of the manufacture of pottery, for the Zhou state. King Wu of Zhou thought highly of Efu, and gave his eldest daughter, Da Ji (大姬), to Efu's son Man in marriage.

After King Wu conquered the Shang dynasty to establish the Zhou dynasty in 1046/45 BC, he enfeoffed the descendants of three ancient sage kings in the newly conquered land, known as the San Ke (三恪, "Three Reverent States"), and Man was enfeoffed at the state of Chen, with its capital at Wanqiu, in modern Huaiyang County, Henan Province.

After Duke Hu died, he was succeeded by his son Xihou (犀侯), posthumously known as Duke Shēn of Chen. After the death of Duke Shēn, a younger son of Duke Hu, Gaoyang (皋羊), ascended the throne, to be known as Duke Xiang of Chen.

== Family ==
Wife: Daji (大姬), Zhou Wuwang's eldest daughter

Children

- Chen Shengong (陳申公), older son, 2nd ruler of Chen
- Chen Xianggong (陳相公), younger son, 3rd ruler of Chen

== Legacy ==
Duke Hu is honoured as the founding ancestor of the Chen surname, which originated in the state of Chen. As of 2020, Chen is the 5th most common surname in China and 4th most common in the world, shared by 70 million people within the country and over 100 million people worldwide (in 2014, there were 54 million in China and 80 million worldwide).

Duke Hu's descendants adopted his posthumous name Hu as their surname, and Duke Hu is considered the primogenitor of the Hu clan, the 15th most common surname in China. Dozens of other surnames, including Tian, Yuan, and Che, originated as branches of the Hu surname.

The Chen clan would later found the Chen dynasty of China and then the Trần dynasty (陈朝), a golden age of Vietnam. (Trần is the Vietnamese pronunciation of Chen).

In 1400 AD, Hồ Quý Ly overthrew the Trần dynasty and established the Hồ dynasty. Hồ is the Vietnamese pronunciation for Hú (胡). He claimed to be a descendant of Duke Hu and Emperor Shun, and changed the name of Vietnam from Đại Việt to Đại Ngu (大虞), or Great Ngu (Ngu is the Vietnamese pronunciation for Yú (虞), the legendary pre-enthronement fief of Emperor Shun).

== Tomb ==
Duke Hu's tomb was said to be made of iron and buried under water near the Dragon Lake in Huaiyang County. Archaeologists have found Western Zhou era pottery shards and Warring States-era roof tiles in the area. In 1995, Singaporean businessman Chen Yonghe (陳永和) donated funds to build a new mausoleum and temple complex for Hu/Chen in Huaiyang, and it has become a popular pilgrimage site for people of Chen, Hu, and other surnames that originated in the state of Chen.

== Memorial ==
A memorial of Chen Hu Gong (陈胡公纪念堂) has been built in Fuzhou, capital of Fujian.
