= Duke Shēn of Chen =

Duke Shen of Chen 陳申公

2nd ruler of Chen
- Reign: 10th century BC
- Predecessor: Duke Hu of Chen
- Successor: Duke Xiang of Chen (brother)
- Issue: Duke Xiao of Chen
Names
- Gui Xihou (媯犀侯)
Posthumous name
- Duke Shen (申公)
- House: Gui
- Dynasty: Chen
- Father: Duke Hu of Chen

Duke Shen of Chen (Chinese: 陳申公; pinyin: Chén Shēn Gōng; reigned 10th century BC), personal name Gui Xihou, was the second ruler of the Chen state.

He succeeded his father Duke Hu of Chen, who married the eldest daughter of King Wu of Zhou. After Duke Shēn's death, he was succeeded by his younger brother, Gaoyang (Duke Xiang). However, when Duke Xiang died, the throne returned to Duke Shēn's son, Tu (Duke Xiao).
