= Chen Tuo =

Ruler of Chen from 707 to 706 BC

Chen Tuo 陳佗

13th ruler of Chen
- Reign: 707–706 BC
- Predecessor: Duke Huan of Chen
- Successor: Duke Li of Chen
- Died: 706 BC
Names
- Chen Tuo (陳佗)
Posthumous name
- None
- House: Gui
- Dynasty: Chen
- Father: Duke Wen of Chen

Chen Tuo (Chinese: 陳佗; pinyin: Chén Tuó; reigned 707 BC – died 706 BC), also known as Chen Ta (陳他) and Wufu (五父), was a duke of the Chen state.

Chen Tuo was a son of Duke Wen and a younger brother of Duke Huan. In the first month of 707 BC, Duke Huan died under strange circumstances. He was believed to have become demented, and went missing for sixteen days before his body was found. The uncertainty threw the state into chaos, and Chen Tuo took the opportunity to murder his nephew, Duke Huan's son Crown Prince Mian, and usurp the throne.

Duke Huan had a younger son named Yue, who was born to a princess of the neighbouring Cai state. After Chen Tuo's usurpation, the Cai army attacked and killed Chen Tuo in the eighth month of 706 BC. The marquis of Cai then installed Yue (Duke Li) to the Chen throne.

== Bibliography ==
- Han, Zhaoqi, ed. (2010). "Houses of Chen and Qi". Shiji 史记 (in Chinese). Beijing: Zhonghua Book Company. ISBN 978-7-101-07272-3.
- Yang, Bojun, ed. (2009). 春秋左传注 [Annotated Chunqiu Zuozhuan] (in Chinese) (3rd revised ed.). Beijing: Zhonghua Book Company. ISBN 978-7-101-07074-3.
