= Chen (state) =

Zhou dynasty Chinese state (c. 1045–479 BC)

Chen 陳
- c. 1045 BC–479 BC
- Capital: Wanqiu (宛丘)
- Government: Monarchy
- History
  - Established: c. 1045 BC
  - Became capital of Chu: 479 BC
Succeeded by
Chu (state)

Chen
- "Chen" in seal script (top), Traditional (middle), and Simplified (bottom) Chinese characters
- Traditional Chinese: 陳
- Simplified Chinese: 陈
Transcriptions
Standard Mandarin
- Hanyu Pinyin: Chén
- Gwoyeu Romatzyh: Chern
- Wade–Giles: Ch'en^{2}
- IPA: [ʈʂʰə̌n]
Yue: Cantonese
- Yale Romanization: Chàhn
- Jyutping: Can^{4}
Southern Min
- Tâi-lô: Tân
Middle Chinese
- Middle Chinese: ɖin
Old Chinese
- Baxter–Sagart (2014): *lri[n]

Chen (simplified Chinese: 陈; traditional Chinese: 陳; pinyin: Chén) was a state founded by Duke Hu of Chen during the Zhou dynasty of ancient China. It existed from c. 1045 BC–479 BC. Its capital was Wanqiu, in present-day Huaiyang County in the plains of eastern Henan province. Chen, the 4th most popular Chinese surname in the world, and members of the Hu clan, the 13th most popular Chinese surname in the world, would claim descent from the Duke Hu of Chen who was in turn descended from the legendary Emperor Shun. At its peak, Chen encompassed fourteen cities in modern-day Henan and Anhui.

== Name ==
It is written 陳 the same as the Chen surname. In ancient texts, it is sometimes misspelled as 敶, also pronounced Chen.

== Territory ==
Chen was originally from Taihao (太昊、太皞), the capital of Fuxi's clan. It was south of the Yellow River.

=== Capital ===
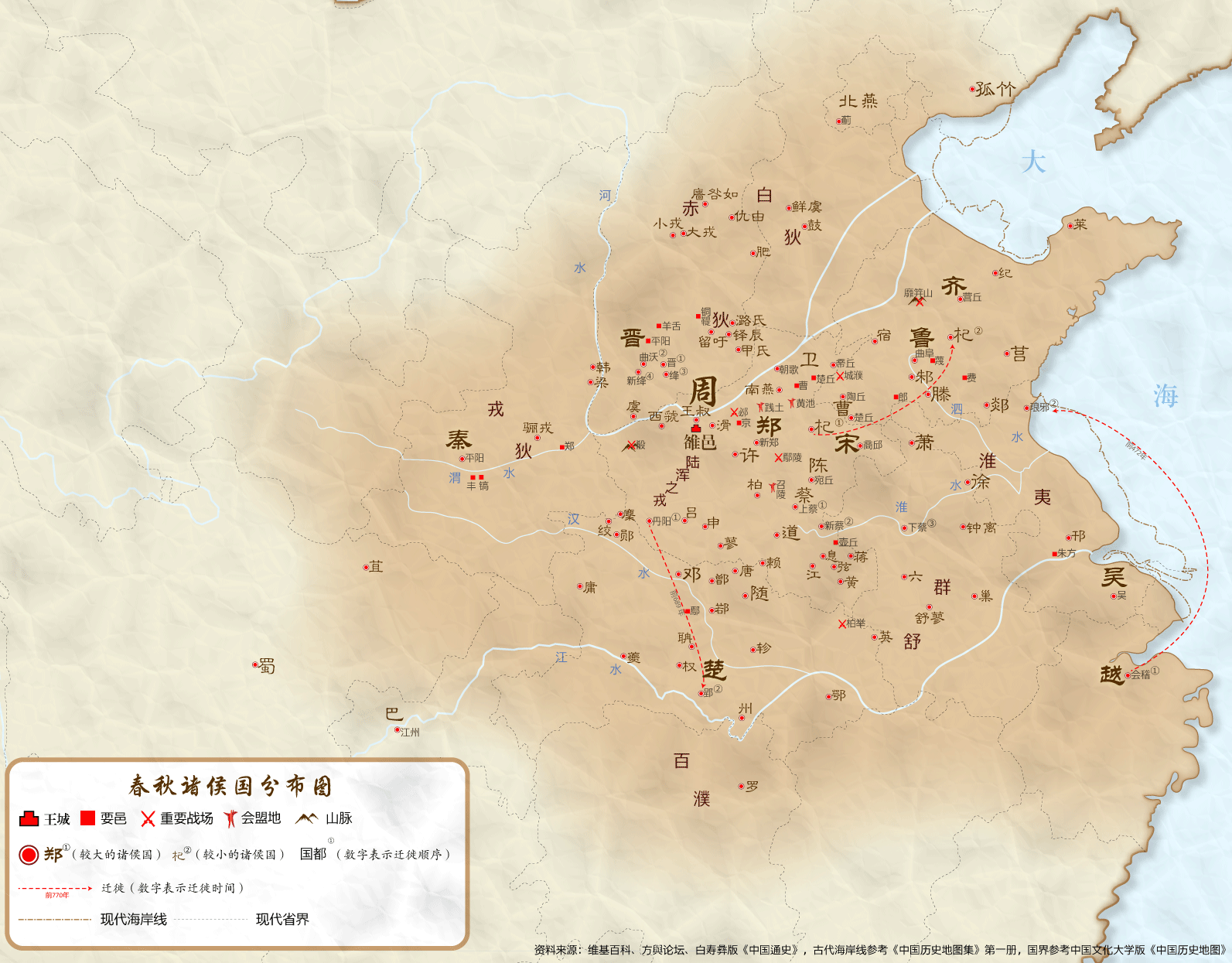
Chen territory (east China)

Its capital was Wanqiu, in present-day Huaiyang County in the plains of eastern Henan province. Zhu Xi explains that Wanqiu means "[a hill] with a crater on top surrounded by high walls on all four sides".

== History ==
According to tradition, the royal family of Chen were descendants of the legendary sage king Emperor Shun. After the conquest of the Shang dynasty in 1046/45 BC, King Wu of Zhou enfeoffed his son-in-law Gui Man, a descendant of Shun, at Chen, and Man became known as Duke Hu of Chen (Chen Hugong).

Duke Shēn of Chen, son of Hugong, then became second duke of Chen.

Chen later became an ally state of Chu, fighting as an ally of Chu at the Battle of Chengpu. It was finally unified with the Chu in 479 BC. Many people of Chen then took the name of their former country as their family name, and account for the many of Chinese people with the family name Chen today. After the destruction of the old Chu capital at Ying, Chen became the Chu capital.

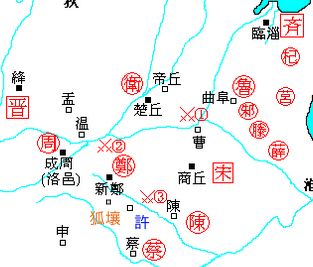
Location of Chen state

== Achievements and descendants ==
- The founding duke, formally known as Duke Hu of Chen, is credited with being the originator of the Hu (surname) and the Chen (surname).
- The Chen clan would later found the Chen dynasty of China and then the Trần dynasty, a golden age of Vietnam (陳朝 Tran is the Vietnamese pronunciation of Chen).
- In 1400 AD, Hồ Quý Ly overthrew the Trần dynasty and established the Hồ dynasty (Hồ is the Vietnamese pronunciation for "Hu"). He claimed to be a descendant of Chen Hugong and Emperor Shun, and changed the name of Vietnam from Đại Việt to Đại Ngu (大虞), or Great Ngu (Ngu is the Vietnamese pronunciation for Yu 虞 the legendary state of Emperor Shun).
- In ancient times 陳 sounded similar to 東 dong, meaning 'East'. It also sounded similar to 田 tian. After the warring states period, some members of the Chen clan in Qi (state) adopted the surname 田 Tian, which later became popular in Chinese and Japanese surnames.

In summary, surnames with descent from Chen include:

- Chen surname 陳姓
- Gui surname 妫姓
- Hu surname 胡姓
- Tian surname 田姓
- Yu surname 虞姓
- Yao surname 姚姓
- Yuan surname 袁姓

== Culture ==
The Shijing has at least 10 songs dedicated to Chen:《宛丘》、《東門之枌》、《衛門》、《東門之池》、《東門之楊》、《墓門》、《防有鵲巢》、《月出》、《株林》、《澤陂》。

== Rulers ==
The state of Chen lasted nearly 600 years and produced over 25 rulers. In chronological order from first to last (note Hu Gong means Duke of Hu and vice versa):

1. Duke Hu of Chen
2. Duke Shēn of Chen
3. Duke Xiang of Chen
4. Duke Xiao of Chen
5. Duke Shèn of Chen
6. Duke You of Chen
7. Duke Xi of Chen
8. Duke Wu of Chen
9. Duke Yi of Chen
10. Duke Ping of Chen
11. Duke Wen of Chen
12. Duke Huan of Chen
13. Chen Tuo
14. Duke Li of Chen
15. Duke Zhuang of Chen
16. Duke Xuan of Chen
17. Duke Mu of Chen
18. Duke Gong of Chen
19. Duke Ling of Chen
20. Xia Zhengshu
21. Duke Cheng of Chen
22. Duke Ai of Chen
23. Prince Liu
24. Chuan Fengxu
25. Duke Hui of Chen
26. Duke Huai of Chen
27. Duke Min of Chen

== Table ==
	Ruler	Title (Chinese)	Other Name (Chinese)	Reign (BC)	Number of years ruling	Identity
1	Chen Hugong	胡公	滿	1045—986	Ruled for 60 years	The founder of Chen
2	Duke Shēn of Chen	申公	犀侯	985—961	Ruled for 25 years	-
3	Duke Xiang of Chen	相公	皋羊	960—939	Ruled for 22 years	The younger brother of Duke Shēn
4	Duke Xiao of Chen	孝公	突	938—905	Ruled for 34 years	The son of Duke Shēn
5	Duke Shèn of Chen	慎公	圉戎	904—855	Ruled for 50 years	The son of Duke Xiao
6	Duke You of Chen	幽公	寧	854—832	Ruled for 23 years	The son of Duke Shen
7	Duke Xi of Chen	僖公	孝	831—796	Ruled for 36 years	The son of Duke You
8	Duke Wu of Chen	武公	靈	795—781	Ruled for 15 years	The son of Duke Xi
9	Duke Yi of Chen	夷公	說	780—778	Ruled for 3 years	The son of Duke Wu
10	Duke Ping of Chen	平公	燮	777—755	Ruled for 23 years	The younger brother of Duke Yi
11	Duke Wen of Chen	文公	圉	754—745	Ruled for 10 years	The son of Duke Ping
12	Duke Huan of Chen	桓公	鮑	744—707	Ruled for 38 years	The son of Duke Wen
13	Chen Tuo	-	佗	707─706	Ruled for 8 months	The younger brother of Duke Huan
14	Duke Li of Chen	厲公	躍	706─700	Ruled for 7 years	The son of Duke Huan
15	Duke Zhuang of Chen	莊公	林	699—693	Ruled for 7 years	The son of Duke Li
16	Duke Xuan of Chen	宣公	杵臼	692—648	Ruled for 45 years	The younger brother of Duke Zhuang
17	Duke Mu of Chen	穆公	款	647—632	Ruled for 16 years	The son of Duke Xuan
18	Duke Gong of Chen	共公	朔	631—614	Ruled for 18 years	The son of Duke Mu
19	Duke Ling of Chen	靈公	平國	613—599	Ruled for 15 years	The son of Duke Gong
20	Xia Zhengshu	-	徵舒	599	Ruled for multiple months	The great-grandson of Duke Xuan
21	Duke Cheng of Chen	成公	午	598—569	Ruled for 30 years	The son of Duke Ling
22	Duke Ai of Chen	哀公	弱	568—534	Ruled for 35 years	The son of Duke Cheng
23	Gongzi Liu	-	留	534, from March to November	Ruled for 9 months	The son of Duke Ai
24	Chuan Fengxu	-	穿封戌	533—529	Ruled for 5 years	Advisor of Chu
25	Duke Hui of Chen	惠公	吳	529—506	Ruled for 28 years	Grandson of Duke Ai
26	Duke Huai of Chen	懷公	柳	505—502	Ruled for 4 years	Son of Duke Hui
27	Duke Min of Chen	湣公	越	501—478	Ruled for 24 years	Son of Duke Huai

Note: the reign lengths of the dukes before Duke You of Chen are derived from conjecture, and are only for reference.

== Family tree ==
Chen state

^{(1)}Duke Hu 胡公滿; 1071-1045-986
^{(2)}Duke Shēn 陳申公 犀侯 ?-985-961BC	^{(3)}Duke Xiang 陳相公 皋羊 ?-960-939
^{(4)}Duke Xiao 陳孝公 突 ?-938-905BC
^{(5)}Duke Shèn 陳慎公 圉戎 ?-904-855BC
^{(6)}Duke You 陳幽公 寧 ?-854-832BC
^{(7)}Duke Xi 陳僖公 孝 ?-832-796BC
^{(8)}Duke Wu 陳武公 靈 ?-796-781BC	□
^{(9)}Duke Yi 陳夷公 說 ?-781-778BC	^{(10)}Duke Ping 陳平公 燮 ?-778-755BC	鍼子
^{(11)}Duke Wen 陳文公 圉 ?-755-745BC
^{(12)}Duke Huan 陳桓公 鮑 754-745-707BC	^{(13)}Chen Tuo 陳佗; 754-707BC
免 ?-707BC	^{(14)}Duke Li 陳厲公 躍 ?-707-700BC	□ 慶氏
^{(15)}Duke Zhuang 陳莊公 林 ?-700-693BC	Chen Wan 完 706BC-? Tian Qi	^{(16)}Duke Xuan 陳宣公 杵臼 ?-693-648BC
御寇 ?-672BC	^{(17)}Duke Mu 陳穆公 款 ?-648-632BC	少西 夏氏	□ 宗氏
^{(18)}Duke Gong 陳共公 朔 ?-632-614BC	御叔
^{(19)}Duke Ling 陳靈公 平國 ?-614-599BC	^{(20)}Xia Zhengshu 夏徵舒 ?-599BC
^{(21)}Duke Cheng 陳成公 午 ?-599-569BC
^{(22)}Duke Ai 陳哀公 弱 ?-569-534BC	黃	招	過 ?-534BC
偃師 ?-534BC	^{(23)}Prince Liu 留 ?-534BC-?	勝	□
^{(24)}Duke Hui 陳惠公 吳 ?-529-506BC	貞子
^{(25)}Duke Huai 陳懷公 柳 ?-506-502BC-?
^{(26)}Duke Min 陳閔公 越 ?-502-478BC

See zh:陈国君主世系图

Rulers of Chen, Hugong to Yougong

6. Duke You of Chen (陳幽公)
5. Duke Shèn of Chen (陳慎公)
4. Duke Xiao of Chen (陈孝公)
2. Duke Shēn of Chen (陈申公)
1. Chen Hugong (陈胡公)
3. Chen Xianggong (陈相公)

Rulers of Chen, Yougong to Wengong

9. Duke Yi of Chen (陳夷公)
8. Duke Wu of Chen (陳武公)
11. Duke Wen of Chen (陳文公)
10. Duke Ping of Chen (陳平公)
7. Duke Xi of Chen (陳僖公)
6. Duke You of Chen (陳幽公)

Rulers of Chen, Wengong to Gonggong

18. Duke Gong of Chen (陳共公)
17. Duke Mu of Chen (陳穆公)
15. Duke Zhuang of Chen (陳莊公)
12. Duke Huan of Chen (陳桓公)
16. Duke Xuan of Chen (陳宣公)
11. Duke Wen of Chen (陳文公)
14. Duke Li of Chen (陳厲公)
13. Chen Tuo (陳佗)

== See also ==
- Chen (surname), 陳姓 adopted by people of Chen state
- Chen Hugong, founding emperor
- Emperor Shun (舜帝), forefather of Chen
- Tian Qi 田齊
- Gui surname 妫姓
- Hu surname 胡姓
- Tian surname 田姓
- Yu surname 虞姓
- Yao surname 姚姓
- Yuan surname 袁姓
- Yuan Taotu, relative of Chen family

== Reading ==
- 《史記》卷36：陳杞世家 [Shiji]
- 《春秋左氏傳》(始見於隱公三年) [Spring and Autumn period]
