= Duke Li of Chen =

Ruler of Chen from 706 BC to 700 BC

Duke Li of Chen 陳厲公

14th ruler of Chen
- Reign: 706–700 BC
- Predecessor: Chen Tuo
- Successor: Duke Zhuang of Chen
- Died: 700 BC
- Issue: Gui Wan (媯完)
Names
- Gui Yue (媯躍)
Posthumous name
- Duke Li (厲公)
- House: Gui
- Dynasty: Chen
- Father: Duke Huan of Chen
- Mother: Princess of Cai

Duke Li of Chen (Chinese: 陳厲公; pinyin: Chén Lì Gōng; reigned 706 BC – 700 BC), personal name Gui Yue, was a duke of the Chen state.

Duke Li was a son of Duke Huan, who died under strange circumstances. He was believed to have become demented and went missing in the first month of 707 BC, before his body was found sixteen days later. The uncertainty threw the state into turmoil, and Duke Huan's younger brother Chen Tuo took the opportunity to murder Duke Li's elder brother Crown Prince Mian and usurp the throne.

Duke Li's mother was a princess of the neighbouring Cai state. After Chen Tuo's usurpation, the Cai army attacked the Chen state and killed Chen Tuo in 706 BC. The marquis of Cai then installed Duke Li to the Chen throne.

Duke Li died in 700 BC, after a reign of seven years. He was succeeded by his younger brother, Lin (Duke Zhuang).

Duke Li was the father of Gui Wan (媯完), who later fled to the Jiang Qi state in 672 BC. The Tian (田) clan descended from Gui Wan grew increasingly powerful over the centuries and eventually usurped the Jiang Qi throne and founded the Tian Qi state.

== Bibliography ==
- Han, Zhaoqi, ed. (2010). "Houses of Chen and Qi". Shiji 史记 (in Chinese). Beijing: Zhonghua Book Company. ISBN 978-7-101-07272-3.
- Yang, Bojun, ed. (2009). 春秋左传注 [Annotated Chunqiu Zuozhuan] (in Chinese) (3rd revised ed.). Beijing: Zhonghua Book Company. ISBN 978-7-101-07074-3.
