= Yang Bojun =

Chinese philologist (1909–1992)

Yang Bojun 杨伯峻
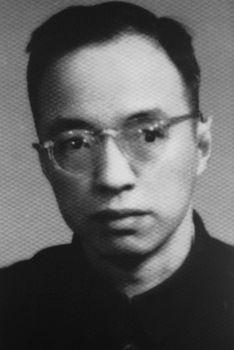
- Born: 1 September 1909; Changsha, Hunan, China
- Died: 1992 (aged 82–83); China
- Education: Peking University
- Known for: annotation of Confucian classics
- Spouse: Xu Ti
- Scientific career
- Fields: Chinese philology
- Workplaces: Peking University; Lanzhou University

Yang Bojun (Chinese: 杨伯峻; Wade–Giles: Yang Po-chün; 1 September 1909 − 1992) was a Chinese philologist best known for his Chunqiu Zuozhuan Zhu (春秋左传注), an annotated commentary of the ancient Chinese historical text and Confucian classic Zuo Zhuan. The work took him more than twenty years to finish. His commentaries of the Analects of Confucius and the Mencius are also highly influential.

== Early life and education ==
Yang Bojun was born in September 1909 in Changsha, Hunan province. He was the eldest son of Yang Shugu (杨树穀), and was also known as Yang Dechong (杨德崇). Starting in childhood, he was taught by his grandfather to read Confucian classics such as the Analects, the Book of Poetry, and the Zuo zhuan.

In 1926, he passed the examination to enter the Chinese department of Peking University, where he studied under prominent scholars such as Qian Xuantong, Chen Yuan, and the philologist Huang Kan. He graduated in 1932. However, the person who influenced him the most was his uncle Yang Shuda (杨树达), also a well-known philologist.

== Career ==
In 1953, Yang became an associate professor at the Chinese department of Peking University. He began writing Lunyu Yizhu (论语译注, "Translation and Annotation of the Analects"), which was published in 1958 by Zhonghua Book Company.

When the Anti-Rightist Movement began in 1957, Yang and three of his cousins (sons of Yang Shuda) were labelled "Rightists". Yang was transferred to Lanzhou University in remote Gansu province, where he continued to teach in the Chinese department. In Lanzhou he wrote Mengzi Yizhu (孟子译注, "Translation and Annotation of the Mencius"), which was published by Zhonghua Book Company in 1960.

In 1960 he moved back to Beijing to work for Zhonghua Book Company, where he edited the Book of Jin, and began working on Chunqiu Zuozhuan Zhu (Annotated Zuo Zhuan). Zuo Zhuan was the most monumental work of the Thirteen Classics, comprising almost 200,000 characters of Old Chinese. For the annotation Yang studied many related works including the Shiji, Gongyang Zhuan, and Guliang Zhuan. He also consulted older commentaries and notes on the Zuo Zhuan by scholars such as Hong Liangji, Liu Wenqi (劉文淇), Liu Shipei, and Zhang Binglin, as well as oracle bone records and bronze inscriptions.

Many of his notes were destroyed during the turmoil of the Cultural Revolution (1966–76), which he only partially recovered from memory. The book was finally published in 1981, more than 20 years after he started the work. A revised edition was published in 1990. In 1985, the Zuo Zhuan Dictionary, compiled by Yang and his wife Xu Ti (徐提), was published.
