= The Legend of Qin (film) =

2014 Chinese film by Robin Shen

- Chinese: 秦时明月3D电影龙腾万里
- Directed by: Robin Shen
- Release date: 8 August 2014
- Running time: 90 minutes
- Country: China
- Language: Mandarin
- Box office: US$9.75 million

The Legend of Qin 3D Ancient Dragon Spirit (Chinese: 秦时明月3D电影龙腾万里) is a 2014 Chinese animated fantasy adventure wuxia film written and directed by Robin Shen.

An unlikely quartet - a boy, a young rebel and descendant of a reviled war criminal, a mysterious girl and descendant of the Divine Dragon and the kingdom's greatest warrior - cross the desert to find the hidden kingdom of Loulan to prevent Emperor Qin from awakening an ancient weapon that will return China to war. The events in the film take place before the events in The Legend of Qin (TV series).

== Plot ==
=== Background ===
Thousands of years ago, the supreme Goddess forged a fallen meteor into a powerful sword, to be used by Chi You to bring peace. However he became corrupted by its power and a terrible war broke out. The land was devastated by the now fearless warlord Chi You. A young, wise and courageous man, Huang Di (Yellow Emperor) led his people against Chi You with the help of the Supreme Goddess. He wielded the power of the Dragon and eventually won the war. The Supreme Goddess sealed Huang Di's ultimate weapon, a gem called the Dragons Soul, in Loulan in far western China. Now the Qin Emperor seeks the Demon Robot which is the last of 81 bronze giants created by Chi You.

=== Story ===
In a remote border town, the rebel Shaoyu and his troops are observing the actions of the Qin army. A mischievous young boy, Tianming is entrusted with a metallic ball by his Uncle Lu, machinery expert. However, he is under observation by the Qin and is attacked by the Yin Yang Priestesses of Birth and Dearth, accompanied by Gongshu Chou and his miniature machinery lizards. Tianming escapes and is saved from the Qin soldiers by Ge Nie and his sword Rainbow Abyss. Wei Zhuang and his Quicksand Group arrive to seize the metallic ball, but Ne Gie enables Tianming to escape. Tianming then encounters Shaoyu and they fight over the metallic ball which transforms into the tiny metal-eating dragon Pi Xiu. While trying to catch Pi Xiu, its owner, the mysterious Xiao Li arrives. She wears a necklace containing a blue gem called the Tears of a Goddess. All three are captured by Qin troops although Pi Xiu escapes. Pi Xiu frees the boys, and Xiao Li rescues them on a flying machinery dragon, but it crashes in the desert. Pursued through the desert by a Qin General and the Quicksand Group, the three are saved by Ne Gie. They accidentally find the secret entrance to Loulan through underground rivers in the desert.

In Loulan, the High Priestess says Pi Xiu contains the gem called the Dragon's Soul. She denounces Xiao Li as a descendant of the treacherous Lord Chi and she is imprisoned with the boys and Ge Nie. The Quicksand Group arrive and seize the powerful Chi You sword while Gongshu Chou gets the Dragons Soul gem which gives him control over the Demon Robot. Meanwhile Tianming, Shaoyu and Xiao Li escape and climb inside the robot to stop it. Ne Gie manages to defeat Wei Zhuang and takes the sword. With the help of Pi Xiu, Xiao Li uses the sword to immobilize the robot and save Loulan. Finally, Ne Gie reveals to Tianming that the boy's father asked Ne Gie to protect him. As Xiao Li' body slowly fades away, the Priestess realizes that she was the physical embodiment of the Tears of the Goddess.

== Voice cast ==
For detailed descriptions of the characters, see the List of The Legend of Qin characters.

Voice Actor	Character
冯骏骅/Feng Junhua	荆天明/Jing Tianming
沈达威/Shen Dawei	项少羽(项羽)/Xiang Shaoyu(Xiang Yu)
季冠霖/Ji Guanlin	小黎/Xiao Li
周佶/Zhou Ji	貔貅/Pixiu
刘钦/Liu Qin	盖聂/Ge Nie
张嘉译/Zhang Jiayi	卫庄/Wei Zhuang
吴磊/Wu Lei	魔化卫庄/Possessed Wei Zhuang
/	白凤/White Phoenix
/	赤练/Crimson Lotus
黄莺Huang Ying	大司命/Priestess of Death
/	少司命/Priestess of Birth
王肖兵/Wang Xiaobing	公输仇/Gongshu Chou
程玉珠/Cheng Yuzhu	吕老伯/Uncle Lü
孟祥龙/Meng Xianglong	水果将军/General Fruit
游军/You Jun	秦国副将/Qin Vice General
狄菲菲/Di Feifei	大祭司/Loulan High Priestess
赵乾景/Zhao Qianjing	楼兰武士/Loulan soldier
钟有道/Zhong Youdao	旁白/Narrator

== Reception ==
The film earned CN¥59.984 million in China.
