= Nine Songs of the Moving Heavens =

Chinese animated CG TV series

- Poster for Nine Songs of the Moving Heavens showing the main Quicksand characters.
- Written by: Robin Shen
- Directed by: Robin Shen; Chen Qianyuan
- Voices of: Zhao Lu; Wu Lei; Huang Ying; Di Wei
- Opening theme: "Nine Songs of the Moving Heavens" by Henry Huo
- Ending theme: "Style of Painting" by Hou Xian
- Composers: The One Studio; Wei Xiaohan; Gouyin; Huang Shujun
- Country of origin: China Mainland
- Original language: Mandarin
- No. of seasons: 2
- No. of episodes: 90 {ongoing}

Production
- Executive producer: Robin Shen
- Producers: Shen Leping; Wenshi Yi; Yang Zhichao
- Production company: Sparkly Key

Original release
- Release: March 10, 2016 – present

Nine Songs of the Moving Heavens (Chinese: 天行九歌; pinyin: tiān xíng jiǔ gē) is a Chinese animated CG TV series that was released on March 10, 2016, and produced by Robin Shen and directed by Chen Qianyuan. It can also be translated as Nine Songs of the Sky. This series is the prequel to The Legend of Qin, which takes place before the time of the Qin dynasty. In an interview with Robin Shen, it was stated that although the two animated series have intersections of characters and timelines, Nine Songs of the Moving Heavens is an independent story with the focus on the creation of the Quicksand group by the Ninth Prince of Han, Han Fei.

== Story ==
During the Warring States period in China, danger seemed to lurk within the Han State which is seen to be the weakest of the Seven States. It is under threat from the more powerful Qin State while the ageing Han King is losing his grip on power due to internal power struggles. The greatest threat is the Great General of Han, Ji Wuye and the Four Fearful Warriors of Nightfall, (Note: Chinese: 夜幕四凶将; pinyin: yèmù sì xiōng jiāng) each specializing in military, finance, politics, and espionage.

The Ninth Prince of Han, Han Fei, hopes to create a new world with a stronger Han State that can overcome its internal problems and withstand the pressure from the Qin. He forms Quicksand (Note: Chinese: 流沙; pinyin: Liúshā) with Wei Zhuang, Zhang Liang, Zinü, and Nong Yu, who support the Prince in realizing his goal while helping to combat the forces against him.

== Characters ==
=== Main protagonists ===
The main Protagonists are a group associated with Han Fei and form the core of the Quicksand Group based in the Han State.

- Han Fei (Chinese: 韩非; pinyin: Hán Fēi)

Voiced by: Zhao Lu (Chinese: 赵路; pinyin: Zhào Lù)
Han Fei is the Ninth Prince of the Han State. He appears quite carefree and is often seen drinking wine in the company of female entertainers. He has no martial arts skills, however his intelligence is higher than most and he is a strategic thinker. As a young man he studied at the Junior Sage Village and was the best student under Xun Kuang. Over time, he became frustrated at the waste and corruption in Han State and formed the clandestine Quicksand group with Wei Zhuang and Zinü. First appearance: Episode 1.

- Wei Zhuang (Chinese: 卫庄; pinyin: Wèi Zhuāng)

Voiced by: Wu Lei (Chinese: 吴磊; pinyin: Wú Lěi)
Wei Zhuang is one of the only two students from the Ghost Valley and his Senior 'Brother' is Ge Nie, who is currently working for the Qin State protecting the young emperor, Ying Zheng. Wei Zhuang has kept a low profile for some time, but reappears and takes shelter in the Purple Orchid House and becomes a key player in Han Fei's Quicksand group. He maintains a detached appearance, appearing quite cold and unemotional. He is extremely skillful in martial arts and wields the sword Shachi (Shark Teeth). First appearance: Episode 4.

- Zinü (Chinese: 紫女; pinyin: Zǐ Nǚ)

Voiced by: Huang Ying (Chinese: 黄莺; pinyin: Huáng Yīng)
Zinü is the owner of the Purple Orchid House, a brothel, and is the wielder of the snake sword, Chilian. Along with Wei Zhuang, she is a founding member of in Han Fei's Quicksand group. She is intelligent, mature and charming, as well as being quite beautiful. She appears to have another identity and Zinü may not be her real name. First appearance: Episode 2 but officially appears in Episode 3.

- Zhang Liang (Zifang) (Chinese: 张良; pinyin: Zhāng Liáng)

Voiced by: Di Wei (Chinese: 翟巍; pinyin: Dí Wēi)
Zhang Liang is the grandson of the Prime Minister of the Han State, Zhang Kaidi, and his courtesy name Zifang. He has a good nature and is very intelligent, which Han Fei greatly appreciates. In return, he has great respect for Han Fei. He willingly joins Quicksand and becomes an important comrade to Han Fei, Wei Zhuang, and Zinü. First appearance: Episode 3.

- Honglian (Chinese: 红莲; pinyin: Hóng Lián)

Voiced by: Hong Haitian (Chinese: 洪海天; pinyin: Hóng Hǎi Tiān)
Honglian is the precocious daughter of the Han Emperor and is affectionately cared for by her older brother, Han Fei. She is keen to make a contribution to Han Fei's plans, and joins his Quicksand group. She has a bright and cheerful nature, but can be quite astute when necessary. She began martial arts training with Wei Zhuang while Han Fei was away, and appears to have a crush on the swordsman. First appearance: Episode 2.

- Nong Yu (Chinese: 弄玉; pinyin: Nòng Yù)

Voiced by: Hong Haitian (Chinese: 洪海天; pinyin: Hóng Hǎi Tiān)
Nong Yu plays the guqin in the Purple Orchid House and is highly valued by Zinü. Her music is favourably compared to the famous guqin composer from the Zhao State, Kuang Xiu. She learned to play music at a very young age and when she plays, sometimes it triggers memories of her former rough life. She is very calm, polite, and quiet although there may be a different side to her personality. First appearance: Episode 2, officially appears in Episode 9.

=== Han State ===
One of the Seven States, and is considered to be the weakest.

- Han Emperor, Han An

Voiced by: Gu Qiu (Chinese: 贾邱; pinyin: Gǔ Qiū)
The Han Emperor, Han An is ageing and has become distressed with the events within the imperial court and the state. His most trusted advisors are General Ji Wuye and Prime Minister Zhang Kaidi; however, they have very differing opinions and objectives. Yet, Han An keeps everyone under a certain control as he refuses to give up his authority so easily. First appearance: Episode 3.

- Ji Wuye (Chinese: 姬无夜; pinyin: Jī Wú Yè)

Voiced by: Meng Xianglong (Chinese: 孟祥龙; pinyin: Mèng Xiáng Lóng)
Ji Wuye is the Great General of Qin. He has a ruthless and overbearing personality and dominates the imperial court as well as the population. He is ambitious for power and seeks to undermine the authority of the king. He is one of the four leaders of the powerful shadowy force known as "Nightfall". He is very strong and none could ever beat him. First appearance: Episode 3.

- Zhang Kaidi (Chinese: 张开地; pinyin: Zhāng Kāi Dì)

Voiced by: Cheng Yuzhu (Chinese: 程玉珠; pinyin: Chéng Yù Zhū)
Zhang Kaidi is the Prime Minister of Han, grandfather of Zhang Liang (Zifang). For five generations, the Zhang family has served as pillars for the emperor. Zhang Kaidi mistrusts Han Fei and his methods, but has respect for Han Fei's intelligence and turned to him for help on a mystery case. First appearance: Episode 3.

- The Crown Prince of Han

Voiced by: Yu Xiaoxu (Chinese: 虞晓旭; pinyin: Yú Xiǎo Xù)
He is first in line for the succession and appears tough, however he has the reputation of being weak in the face of enemies and is considered a poor candidate for king. First appearance: Episode 28.

- Han Yu (Chinese: 韩宇; pinyin: Hán Yǔ)

Voiced by: Fan Junhang (Chinese: 樊俊航; pinyin: Fán Jùn Háng)
Han Yu is the Fourth Prince of Han. He is a traditionalist, is politically astute, and surrounds himself with powerful and talented people. He is generally on good terms with Han Fei, but they are rivals for the succession and Han Yu pursues his own agenda. First appearance: Episode 13.

- Han Qiancheng (Chinese: 千乘; pinyin: Qiān Chéng)

Voiced by: Dai Chaoxing (Chinese: 戴超行; pinyin: Dài Chāo Xíng)
Han Qiancheng is Han Yu's adopted son and is highly skilled in archery. First appearance: Episode 23.

- Lord Anping (Chinese: 安平君; pinyin: Ān Píng Jūn)

Lord Anping is one of the Han Emperor's brothers. First appearance: Episode 3.

- Lord Longquan (Chinese: 龙泉君; pinyin: Lóng Quán Jūn)

Lord Longquan is one of the Han Emperor's brothers. First appearance: Episode 3.

- Liu Yi (Chinese: 刘意; pinyin: Liú Yì)

Voiced by: Liu Yao (Chinese: 刘垚; pinyin: Liú Yáo)
Liu Yi is the Left Minister of War, serving the Han State. He is also one of Ji Wuye's men. Zinü described Liu Yi as lustful and cruel. First appearance: Episode 10.

- Lady Hu

Voiced by: Zhou Shuai (Chinese: 周帅; pinyin: Zhōu Shuài)
As the wife of the Left Minister of War, Liu Yi. She is well-educated and respectful, but mainly stays indoors and does not speak with women of high class. First appearance: Episode 11.

- Beauty Hu

Voiced by: Luo Yuting (Chinese: 罗玉婷; pinyin: Luō Yù Tíng)
She is the beautiful and favorite concubine of the Han Emperor and is seemingly keeping a good relationship with the Emperor's children. Her older sister is Lady Hu, wife of Liu Yi. However, Honglian calls her a vixen. First appearance: Episode 13.

- Li Kai (Chinese: 李开; pinyin: Lǐ Kāi)

Voiced by: Yinhai Fan (Chinese: 音海帆; pinyin: Yīn Hǎi Fān)
Li Kai is an aged man who was apparently dead, but has reappeared. It is later revealed that he was the Right Minister of War and was in love with Lady Hu. He is considered a traitor in the Han State. First appearance: Episode 10.

=== Nightfall ===
Nightfall is an organization under the Great General of Han, Ji Wuye, and consists of two groups. Firstly, the Four Fearful Warriors of Ji Wuye, Feicui Hu, Lady Mingzhu and Bai Yifei who work in the military, finance, politics, and espionage. Secondly, the Hundreds of Birds which is a group of trained assassins who are code-named after birds.

- Moya (Chinese: 墨鸦; pinyin: Mò Yā)

Voiced by: Xia Lei (Chinese: 夏磊; pinyin: Xià Lěi)
Moya is from Hundreds of Birds, Nightfall and wears black. He follows orders without question and is a most powerful fighter. He is quite ruthless, but can appear charming. He appears to be a mentor to Baifeng. First appearance: Episode 2.

- Baifeng (Chinese: 白凤; pinyin: Bái Fèng)

Voiced by: Xie tiantian (Chinese: 谢添天; pinyin: Xiè Tiān Tiān)
Baifeng is from Hundreds of Birds, Nightfall and wears white. He's Moya's subordinate, so they are often seen together. Baifeng seems more considered than Moya and tends to be quiet and serious, although he can joke with Moya. His lightness skill is so impressive that he almost appears weightless. First appearance: Episode 6, officially appears in Episode 8.

- Bai Yifei (Chinese: 白亦非; pinyin: Bái Yì Fēi)

Voiced by: Liu Beichen (Chinese: 刘北辰; pinyin: Liú Běi Chén)
Bai Yifei is one of the Four Fearful Warriors of Nightfall and is known as the Pure White, Blood Marquess. He is the master of Snow Fort outside the capital, with army of 100,000 soldiers. His family has contributed greatly to the Han State in the past. It is rumoured that he drains the blood of his victims as was said of his mother, the only female Marquess in the Han State and master of the Bloody Fortress. First appearance: Episode 16.

- Feicui Hu (Chinese: 翡翠虎; pinyin: Fěi Cuì Hǔ)

Voiced by: Peng Bo (Chinese: 苏鑫; pinyin: Sū Xīn)
Feicui Hu is one of the Four Fearful Warriors of Nightfall, who is in charge of finance and possesses unimaginable wealth. Ji Wuye refers to him as "Old Hu". Feicui Hu is obsessed with wealth, but will not hesitate to break his prized possessions instead of helping the poor. First appearance: Episode 17.

- Lady Mingzhu (Chinese: 明珠夫人; pinyin: Míngzhū Fūrén)

Voiced by: Zhou Shuai (Chinese: 周帅; pinyin: Zhōu Shuài)
Lady Mingzhu is the Tide Enchantress of the Four Fearful Warriors and is also known as a master of healing although she also utilizes poisons. She is currently the primary concubine of the Han Emperor and is older than Beauty Hu whom she calls "little sister". First appearance: Episode 38.

- Wujiu (Chinese: 兀鹫; pinyin: Wù Jiù)

Voiced by: Peng Bo (Chinese: 彭博; pinyin: Péng Bó)
He is one of the many assassins from Hundreds of Birds. He is an older man who is seemingly acting on his own accord. His motives are unclear. First appearance: Episode 10 (officially appears in Episode 15).

- The Cloaked Man (Chinese: 蓑衣客; pinyin: Suō Yī kè)

Voiced by: Yu Xiaoxu (Chinese: 虞晓旭; pinyin: Yú Xiǎo Xù)
The Cloaked Man is the leader of the intelligence network and is responsible for monitoring all levels of the court for Ji Wuye. His face is never shown and Ji Wuye often meets him while he is fishing on a small boat offshore. First appearance: Episode 38.

=== Qin State ===
The Qin State is one of the Seven States, and is considered the strongest one.

- Li Si (Chinese: 李斯; pinyin: Lǐ Sī)

Voiced by: Liu Yijia (Chinese: 刘以嘉; pinyin: Liú Yǐ Jiā)
Li Si is Han Fei's Junior Brother, who studied under the same teacher at the Confucian School. He considered himself inferior to Han Fei and set off to work for the more powerful Qin State. First appearance: Episode 1, reappears in episode 47.

- Lü Buwei (Chinese: 吕不韦; pinyin: Lǚ Bù Wéi)

Voiced by: Wang Xiaobing (Chinese: 王肖兵; pinyin: Wáng Xiào Bīng)
He is the Prime Minister of Qin, also titled as the Marquis Wenxin. The Emperor of Qin addresses Lü Buwei as his uncle. First appearance: Episode 2.

- Ge Nie (Chinese: 盖聂; pinyin: Gě Niè)

Voiced by: Liu Qin (Chinese: 刘钦; pinyin: Liú Qīn)
He the chief swordsman teacher of Qin after obtained the Qin Emperor's respect for both his sword skills and intelligence. He is very calm and observant and is Wei Zhuang's Senior Brother, whom he has not seen for a long time. First appearance: Episode 50.

- Ying Zheng (Chinese: 嬴政; pinyin: Yíng Zhèng)

The Emperor of Qin, later to be known as Qin Shi Huang. He fears death and searches for answers to whether the fate of mortals is controlled by some kind of greater power and travels under the pseudonym of Mister Shang. It is said that his rule over the state is weak because the Prime Minister wields more power. First appearance: Episode 51, but did appear briefly in episode 2.

- General Wang Yi (Chinese: 王齮; pinyin: Wáng Yǐ)

The Left Chief of the Multitude in the state of Qin. General Wang Yi trains his troops very rigorously and is truly at military strategy. He has served three kings of Qin in his lifetime. First appearance: Episode 87.

- The Chiliarch

A very conscientious and unnamed commander under General Wang Yi stationed in Wusui, on the border between Qin and Han. He is later revealed to be Meng Tian, an eighth-tier noble of Qin. First appearance: Episode 87.

=== Slick Octahedron ===
The Slick Octahedron is Qin's top assassin organization comprising eight assassins whose martial arts, appearances, and personalities are totally different.

- Li Wu (Chinese: 离舞; pinyin: Lí Wǔ)

She plays the flute and can dance. First appearance: Episode 52. But her shadow figure was actually seen in episode 50.

- Qian Sha (Chinese: 乾杀; pinyin: Qián Shā)

A silent man who wields a sword. First appearance: Episode 50.

- Zhen Hou (Chinese: 震侯; pinyin: Zhèn Hóu)

He seems to know Ying Zheng very well and is fond of drinking tea. First appearance: Episode 53.

- Xun Feng (Chinese: 巽蜂; pinyin: Xùn Fēng)

He can control bees. First appearance: Episode 53.

- Kan Shu (Chinese: 坎鼠; pinyin: Kǎn Shǔ)

The oldest man who loves real silver and gold. First appearance: Episode 55.

- Dui Li (Chinese: 兑鲤; pinyin: Duì Lǐ)

The youngest out of the eight. He is scared of blood and doesn't want to kill anyone. First appearance: Episode 55.

- Kun Po (Chinese: 坤婆; pinyin: Kūn Pó)

The oldest woman, who is always seen making medicine. First appearance: Episode 55.

- Gen Shi (Chinese: 艮师; pinyin: Gěn Shī)

A serious man with a heavily scarred face. Zhen Hou considers that his strength may rival that of the Ghost Valley disciples. First appearance: Episode 55.

=== Net Trap ===
Net Trap (Chinese: 罗网; pinyin: Luó Wǎng) is a mysterious assassination group which is based in the State of Qin, but is not part of Qin. It consists of some assassins at a high level, but includes hundreds of operatives at the lower skill levels. Its activities cover the Seven States like a giant web.

- Xuan Jian (Chinese: 玄翦; pinyin: Xuán Jiǎn)

Voiced by: Liang Dawei (Chinese: 梁达伟; pinyin: Liáng Dá Wěi)
The highest ranked "Heaven Level" assassin from Net Trap of the Qin State. "Xuan Jian" is the name of his black and white swords. He is used to be known by Goujian, King of Yue. A powerful swordsman who first gives Wei Zhuang serious wounds. First appearance: Episode 60.

- Wu Qingsi (Chinese: 无情丝; pinyin: Wú Qíng Sī)

Rumor has it that she was killed after a failed assassination, but she actually joined Net Trap because Xuan Jian saved her. She's an embroideress that has cut the threads of love and she claims she is merely a black widow who weaves hatred. First appearance: Episode 69.

- Yan Ri (Chinese: 掩日; pinyin: Yǎn Rì)

Another "Heaven Level" ranked assassin of Net Trap. His real face has never been revealed and he only wears the armor of a foot soldier from Qin. First appearance: Episode 69.

=== Remnants of Baiyue ===
It is said that 10 years earlier, the Baiyue rebelled against Han Emperor. He later sent in the armies of the Blood Marquess's army and the state of Chu in the name of peacemaking, but wiped them out leaving only a few survivors.

- Yanling Ji (Chinese: 焰灵姬; pinyin: Yàn Líng Jī)

Voiced by: Tao Dian (Chinese: 陶典; pinyin: Táo Diǎn)
She was imprisoned in a tank full of water and appeared to be able to breathe underwater. "Gentle like water and warm like fire" was how they described her. She uses fire to harm others and a hypnosis technique to search into her victims' minds. First appearance: Episode 20.

- Wushuang Gui (Chinese: 无双鬼; pinyin: Wú Shuāng Guǐ)

Voiced by: Liu Qin (Chinese: 刘钦; pinyin: Liú Qīn) in episode 21. Yu Xiaoxu (Chinese: 虞晓旭; pinyin: Yú Xiǎoxù) in episode 28 and after.
Wushuang Gui doesn't speak much. He has massive strength in attack and defense, making him very ruthless. His first appeared coming to save Yanling Ji who was imprisoned. First appearance: Episode 21.

- Qu Shimo (Chinese: 驱尸魔; pinyin: Qū Shī Mó)

Voiced by: Xu Xiang (Chinese: 徐翔; pinyin: Xú Xiáng)
He is a secret shaman chief, who can turn bodies and skeletons into zombies. He could herd all the corpses for a thousand miles. He is skilled in Baiyue's insanity arts. First appearance: Episode 25.

- Bai Duwang (Chinese: 百毒王; pinyin: Bǎi Dú Wáng)

Voiced by: Wang Xiaobing (Chinese: 王肖兵; pinyin: Wáng Xiào Bīng)
He is the most elderly out of the remnants of Baiyue. He is highly skilled in a type of Baiyue's poison arts, and can create illusions where people imaging snakes attacking them. First appearance: Episode 26.

- Tian Ze (Chinese: 天泽; pinyin: Tiān Zé)

Voiced by: Chen Yu (Chinese: 陈瑀; pinyin: Chén Yǔ)
Tian Ze is the Crown Prince of Baiyue and is specialized in sorcery. He is the Master of the Remnants of Baiyue. Due to his unusual looks, he is also known by Red Eyebrows Dragon Snake and Lord Red Eyebrows. He was imprisoned for 10 years and now plans to rebuild Baiyue. First appearance: Episode 26.

=== Wei State ===
The Wei State is one of the Seven States, bordering both Han and Qin States.

- Wei Yong (Chinese: 魏庸; pinyin: Wèi Yōng)

He is the Minister of Public Works of the Wei State. Only appears in flashbacks. First appearance: Episode 65.

- King of Wei

A King who relies on Wei Yong and the Great General of Wei as the Qin army attempts to invade their land. Only appears in flashbacks. First appearance: Episode 67.

- Dian Qing (Chinese: 典庆; pinyin: Diǎn Qìng)

A huge and muscular man known as the Chiliarch. He is the disciple of the Great General of Wei as well as the best warrior in the army. Only appears in flashbacks. First appearance: Episode 67.

- Xian Xian (Chinese: 纤纤; pinyin: Xiān Xiān)

She is the daughter of Wei Yong and is in love with Xuan Jian from Net Trap of the Qin state. Only appears in flashbacks. First appearance: Episode 67.

- Empress Dowager Leling (Chinese: 乐灵太后; pinyin: Lè Líng Tài Hòu)

The current Empress Dowager of Wei. She is Honglian's grandmother's sister and is very fond of Honglian. First appearance: Episode 79.

=== Other characters ===
- Xunzi (Chinese: 荀子; pinyin: Xúnzi)

He is Han Fei's teacher, living in Sanghai (Chinese: 桑海; pinyin: sānghǎi). His full name is Xun Kuang (Chinese: 荀况; pinyin: Xún Kuàng). First appearance: Episode 1.

- Hong Yu (Chinese: 红瑜; pinyin: Hóng Yú)

She works in the Purple Orchid House and stays in the same room as Nong Yu. She is shown cleaning Nong Yu's guqin. First appearance: Episode 9.

- Duxie Zi (Chinese: 毒蝎子; pinyin: Dú Xiē Zi)

Duxie Zi is a clan of assassins and also the name of the leader. Duxie means "Venomous Scorpion." It seems they hold people captive, ready to take them away. If someone wants one of them released, a price must be paid first. First appearance: Episode 14.

- Tang Qi (Chinese: 唐七; pinyin: Táng Qī)

He is the leader of the Qi Jue Clan. He acts as the informant to Wei Zhuang, and at the same time, Wei Zhuang helps him. Tang Qi refers him as his boss. First appearance: Episode 13.

- Nilin (Chinese: 逆鳞; pinyin: Nì Lín)

Nilin is the name of the sword, but the wielder's name is unknown. Or perhaps the wielder is the spirit of the sword itself. He only shows up to protect Han Fei when he's in danger. Officially appears in episode 17.

- Ghost Valley Master

His students are Ge Nie and Wei Zhuang. Every master of each generation in the Ghost Valley teaches only two students, who are destined to battle each other. First appearance: Episode 65.

== Episodes ==
| No. | Title |
|---|---|
| 1 | "Introduction (Part 1) - 序章(上)" |
Han Fei tells his teacher, Xun Kuang, about a recurring dream which he can't recall, but in which he always hears a song that lingered in his mind. He decides to return to his home, the Han State and bids his teacher farewell. Before leaving, he tells his Junior 'Brother' Li Si of his plans. The less gifted Li Si decides instead to go to the strongest of the Seven States, Qin. They acknowledge that when they next meet they will be rivals. Along the way, Han Fei manages to consume a fair quantity of alcohol.
| 2 | "Introduction (Part 2) - 序章(下)" |
An official of the Han State is assassinated by Moya, from Nightfall who then sets the place ablaze. Li Si arrives at the Qin State and immediately makes a bold offer to the Prime Minister to increase his wealth. Meanwhile Han Fei arrives at the Han State, not sure of the welcome he will receive. His younger sister Honglian is the first to welcome him, noting however that the necklace she gave him is missing but he quickly changes the topic. In a flashback Han Fei asks his teacher if there is a power beyond mortals which control fate - his teacher replied there is.
| 3 | "Brushing Against the Dragon's Scales (Part 1) - 心之逆鳞" |
On a rainy night on the outskirts of Xinzheng City, a convoy escorting provisions and gold for troops at the border encounter a ghost army who take the provisions and the gold dissolves in the rain. Within the Hidden Dragon Room in Xinzheng, wealthy guests meet and exchange gifts. Han Fei leaves with a mysterious box whose contents are unknown, however he manages to solve the puzzle of how to open it. At the Nangong Mansion, the owner is found hanged, with the word "payback" (Chinese: 還; pinyin: Huán) written on the wall. He is the fifth presiding officer to die. General Ji Wuye accuses Prime Minister Zhang Kaidi who is then given 10 days to reveal the culprit. The Prime Minister's grandson, Zhang Liang (Zifang), takes him to the Purple Orchid House run by Zinu, where he meets Han Fei. Although initially insulted by both the location and Han Fei, Zhang is impressed by Han Fei's powers of deduction.
| 4 | "Brushing Against the Dragon's Scales (Part 2) - 心之逆鳞" |
Han Fei agrees to solve the mystery if he is recommended for the position of Minister of Criminal Justice. Prime Minister Zhang Liang says that he believes Ji Wuye is trying to eliminate his enemies in court and that relatives of the Emperor, Lords An Ping and Long Quan are also suspects. Han Fei takes the case and visits Lords An Ping and Long Quan. He discusses their Dragon Bone with Eight-Treasure Soup which take 18 hours to prepare and then must be consumed while hot. He then questions them about the ghost army attack on the supply convoy in Duan Hun valley and their return that evening to eat the soup. They tell the story of 5,000 Zheng soldiers who were killed in the valley by the Han after surrendering and now want retribution. Han Fei then plays a trick based on the 5 elements theory using Water-Dissolving Gold, and suggests that they knew where and when the attack would happen and the gold carried by the convoy was not real. Back at the Purple Orchid, Han Fei seeks out Wei Zhuang and gives him a message via the puzzle box that had originally come from Wei Zhuang himself. That night, while walking home after drinking heavily, he sees the ghost riders.
| 5 | "Dilemma of the Prisoners - 囚徒困境" |
Han Fei is attacked by ghostly soldiers but is saved by Zinu with her snake sword Chilian and the ghosts turn into crows and depart. In an arrangement with the Royal Father, Lords An Ping and Long Quan are led to prison and held captive. They are each given a chance to confess and the first to do so would be pardoned. Both apparently suicide before Han Fei arrives, however he discovers evidence that they were in fact poisoned.
| 6 | "Stealing from the Tiger - 与虎谋皮" |
Before the Royal Father General Ji Wuye and Prime Minister Zhang debate the deaths of Lords An Ping and Long Quan, and decide not to make the events public. However, until the recovery of the gold, Han Fei will not be made Minister of Criminal Justice. Han Fei discusses the case with Wei Zhuang and states that he knows Zinu saw who poisoned the two lords and that it could only have been one of two people, Moya or Baifeng who both serve Ji Wuye. Han Fei then invites Wei Zhuang to visit Ji Wuye with him. When they arrive, they see three women fighting over gold coins, and he proposes a more interesting version of the game where the losers are put to death. Ji Wuye is amused and orders that they play the game.
| 7 | "Three Women and a Pile of Gold - 三姬分金" |
The three women reluctantly play the game, and all survive with hints from Han Fei, but Ji Wuye stops them from leaving with the gold, saying the strongest will always win. Han Fei says that he knows the lords were poisoned and the location of the gold. Angrily, Ji Wuye draws his sword on Han Fei but Wei Zhuang intercepts it and stops him. At that moment, messengers arrive to invite Han Fei to a feast with the Prime Minister, so Han Fei leaves with Wei Zhuang. Han Fei, Wei Zhuang, Zifang and Zinu spend the evening on a cliff overlooking the city, and later, observe Ji Wuye's heavily laden mounted soldiers leaving his headquarters.
| 8 | "Formless Quicksand - 流沙无形" |
A soldier reports to Ji Wuye that their troops were attacked by a man in black, and the 100,000 pieces of gold stolen, leaving only 1 coin. A messenger from the Han Emperor is announced, and Ji Wuye gives orders that he is to be killed on his signal. The messenger is Zifang and he brings tidings that General Ji Wuye is to be rewarded; for the capture of Lords An Ping and Long Quan, the memorial ceremony for the deceased of Zheng State and the return of the missing gold. Angrily he accepts the small reward of 1,000 gold coins, cursing Han Fei inwardly for spoiling his plans. Han Fei thanks Wei Zhuang for his help in recovering the gold, but Wei Zhuang wants no part what he sees as power plays in government. Han Fei then offers him Ji Wuye's position and asks Wei Zhuang to join him in the formation of a formless power to help the Han State rise to power within the world of the Seven States. Wei Zhuang is intrigued, and Han Fei names the group Quicksand. He then takes up the sword Nilin.
| 9 | "Gemstone of Raining Fire - 火雨玛瑙" |
Han Fei and Wei Zhuang plot to remove Ji Wuye who has the four powerful arms of Nightfall; military, finance, politics and espionage activities. Wei Zhuang suggests Han Fei may underestimate his opposition. The first task in Han Fei's plan is to gather intelligence, meanwhile Ji Wuye formulates his own plans for Han Fei's downfall. In the Purple Orchid, Han Fei, Zifang and Zinu enjoy a musical performance by Nong Yu who wears the fabulous Gemstone of Raining Fire. Their reverie is interrupted by the drunken Left Minister of War, Lord Liu Yi demanding that Nong Yu attend to him.
| 10 | "A Walk in the Dark - 暮色夜行" |
Zinu asks Wei Zhuang why he has decided to help Han Fei. He thinks back to an earlier conversation with Han Fei in which they discussed their relative positions, including Wei Zhuang's relationship with Ge Nie. Wei Zhuang replies that he's interested to see how Han Fei ends up. On his way home that night Han Fei is confronted by a group of assassins who kill his bodyguards. Suddenly, the assassins are all slain by a mysterious swordsman. When Wei Zhuang arrives on the scene and questions him about the incident, Han Fei says cannot identify their killer or the sword he used that left distinctive marks on their bodies. Back at the Purple Orchid, as a Hong Yu packs up Nong Yu's room she is slain by an unknown swordsman.
| 11 | "The Chest of Baiyue - 百越之箱" |
The next day, Han Fei inspects the murder scene and deduces that the murderer was not a professional assassin. While there, Zifang arrives with news that the Left Minister of War, Liu Yi, was killed in his own home. Curiously, Ji Wuye has asked that Han Fei, as Minister of Criminal Justice, carry out the investigation. Liu Yi successfully led an army during the Baiyue expedition and received a promotion whereas the Right Minister of War, Li Kai was the commanding general. At Liu Yi's home, Han Fei discovers a hidden chamber behind a bookcase where the actual murder took place containing a chest with Baiyue designs. Before leaving, Han Fei asks Liu Yi's beautiful young wife Lady Hu if she killed her husband.
| 12 | "Blood Oath of Death - 死之血誓" |
Lady Hu denies that she killed her husband. Han Fei notices her wearing a gemstone of Raining Fire which she says she acquired from an old friend some time ago. On further questioning, and with evidence found in the hidden chamber, Han Fei again asks if Lady Hu killed her husband, but she faints. Although her behavior is suspicious, Han Fei and Zifang do not believe that she is the killer. Wei Zhuang manages to open the Baiyue but it appears to be empty. They suspect that a symbol in the chest signifies a "life and death oath" which may have been broken. Wei Zhuang says he knows someone who may be able to provide clues to the significance of the chest.
| 13 | "The Other Side of Time - 彼岸彼时" |
Wei Zhuang meets the elderly white-haired Tang Qi on a bridge on the border Duxie Zi territory. He is leader of the Qi Jue Clan and rival to Duxie Zi and his clan who has found an ally in General Ji Wuye. Tang Qi tells Wei Zhuang that he heard that Duxie Zi recently caught someone from Baiyue. He recognizes the Baiyue symbol for the Blood Oath of Death. Meanwhile, Han Fei, Zifang and Honglian attend the Zhao State on Mount Wu and he presents her with the necklace he pawned earlier while travelling. They also encounter a radiant Beauty Hu, younger sister of Lady Hu, and a favourite of Han Fei's father. Wei Zhuang crosses the bridge into Duxie Zi territory alone and is surrounded by Duxie Zi's assassins.
| 14 | "Scorpion's Shadow Under the Moon - 月下蝎影" |
Wei Zhuang is challenged by a band of Duxie Zi's assassins on the rainy night, but he easily kills them all. At the show on Mount Wu, Han Fei and Honglian meet Fourth Brother Han Yu who was delegated to escort Beauty Hu. Han Fei questions Beauty Hu about her sister, and she says that her sister reacted badly after seeing a strange-looking servant a month ago. Although Fourth Brother investigated, nothing came of it. Wei Zhuang enters the Duxie Zi household and asks for the prisoners to be released to him. Duxie Zi finds Wei Zhuang's request unacceptable and orders him killed.
| 15 | "Fragrance of the Poisoned Sword - 剑毒衣香" |
Prime Minister Zhang Liang questions Han Fei about progress on the Liu Yi case, but their discussion centers on the power plays within the government. Han Fei is pressed to close the case quickly, but raises the issue of Hong Yu's death in Nong Yu's room at the Purple Orchid. Meanwhile a tattooed thief wearing a bird mask enters Zinu's room searching for something. In the streets, Fourth Brother Han Yu warns Zifang to be careful and they see the Snow Fort army of Bai Yifei the Blood Marquess, who have recently returned from an expedition. At the Duxie Zi household, Wei Zhuang slaughters Duxie Zi's men but is caught in a poisonous fog.
| 16 | "Pure White Blood Marquess - 皑皑血衣" |
Even though he is affected by the poisonous fog, Wei Zhuang manages to defeat Duxie Zi and questions him about the attack on Han Fei. Duxie Zi says it was done by outsiders and he only offered support under the orders of Wujiu of Nightfall. When Duxie Zi tries a surprise attack, Wei Zhuang kills him with his own weapon. In the dungeon, Wei Zhuang finds a man in chains that he remembers seeing earlier in the city. He recalls his conversation with Tang Qi about a rumored treasure from Raining Fire Manor in Baiyue, which contained a mine for Raining Fire gemstones. The lord was generous, but bandits called the Three Hairless Wolves robbed the manor, killing all the inhabitants. They divided the gold equally and swore a Blood Oath of Death, however they all died violently in the mountains. Later, Tang Qi was among the Han army led by Bai Yifei, the master of Snow Fort, who were dispatched to assist Baiyue to quell rebels. However the treasure was never found. Meanwhile Zinu severely wounds the intruder wearing a bird mask who entered her room.
| 17 | "Murderous Ink in the Dungeon - 烈狱墨杀" |
Zinu recognizes the intruder in her room as Wujiu, and as the assassin who killed Liu Yi and Hong Yu. She presumes that he is not acting on the orders of his master General Ji Wuye. Han Fei walks in and the room suddenly comes under fire from a volley of arrows. Zinu intercepts the arrows, saving Han Fei, but she is unable to stop them all until a mysterious man secretly saves them both. In Duxie Zi's dungeon, Wei Zhuang is attacked by Moya who sets the cell fire, but Wei Zhuang manages to escape. Meanwhile General Ji Wuye entertains Feicui Hu (Emerald Tiger) and they discuss the Tide Enchantress.
| 18 | "Endangered Capital - 危城凶局" |
Bai Yifei, the Blood Marquess, arrives unannounced at Ji Wuye's house, and joins the discussion about the influence of Han Yu, but Ji Wuye is more concerned about the appearance of Li Kai and his murder of Liu Yi. Wei Zhuang escapes from the fiery cell with the prisoner and advises Moya to warn his master, Ji Wuye. Moya attacks Wei Zhuang who is too strong and fast, and although wounded, Moya manages to escape as the house bursts into flames. The blazing house of Duxie Zi does not go unnoticed. Wei Zhuang arrives at the Purple Orchid to find that Zinu and Han Fei survived the volleys of arrows, although Han Fei took an arrow in the arm to save Zinu, and Wujiu escaped. Outside, Tang Qi tells Wei Zhuang his men found 8 unidentified archers dead, and that Feicui Hu is sending a gift to the capital by carriage. Wei Zhuang tells Tang Qi that it's now safe to cross the bridge.
| 19 | "Dying Ember in Fire - 余烬死火" |
Han Fei identifies the prisoner rescued from Duxie Zi as the Right Minister of War, Li Kai. He asks him about the daughters of the Master of Raining Fire in Baiyue; one became a concubine of the Emperor, the other, whom he loved and gave a Raining Fire gemstone, married Liu Yi. At Ji Wuye's house, Feicui Hu reveals that Liu Yi conspired with the Three Hairless Wolves to steal the Raining Fire treasure, then had them killed and took it himself. However one of the three survived. He is the intruder who is now searching for the treasure and who killed Liu Yi and Hong Yu. A flashback shows how Liu Yi betrayed Li Kai at the battle in Baiyue years ago and left him for dead.
| 20 | "Confined Behind Bars and Underwater - 池鱼笼鸟" |
Li Kai tells Han Fei and his friends of how he arrived at Liu Yi's house that night to find him dead. He could not catch the murderer that Liu Yi's wife saw him. Han Fei deduces that the killer must be Wujiu acting on his own behalf and not for his master Duxie Zi, but that he did not find the treasure. Zinu races to Liu Yi's house where she finds Wujiu threatening Lady Hu, demanding the treasure. Zinu confronts Wujiu who attacks her, but then takes Lady Hu hostage. Wei Zhuang arrives to break the deadlock, disabling Wujiu, but he fights on and Wei Zhuang kills him. Meanwhile in a deep dungeon a Lord is taken into a special chamber where he is shown a woman imprisoned underwater in a huge tank made from Millennium Crystal.
| 21 | "Burning Heart of Yanling - 焰灵焚心" |
Ji Wuye tells the Emperor that remnants of the Baiyue are rebelling and using witchcraft, setting a blaze of fire in the city against which, water was ineffective. He also says that Li Kai is involved in the insurrection, and that Han Fei has stirred up issues from the past. The Emperor orders him to resolve the chaos and use Bai Yifei to reinforce the defenses, leaving Ji Wuye very pleased. Han Fei takes Lady Hu to stay with her sister Beauty Hu in the palace for protection. Beauty Hu promises her support for him with the Emperor, however Han Fei is confined to his quarters on orders of the Emperor. Zifang delivers a gift from Han Fei to Fourth Son signifying his support for the prince. Fourth Son places the condition that Zifang also helps him with another matter. Meanwhile in the deep dungeon, Wushuang Gui, a huge warrior breaks in, killing all the guards and freeing Yanling Ji, the woman imprisoned in the tank. She kills the Lord with fire and as they leave, she sets the prison ablaze.
| 22 | "Bloody Forbidden Area - 血色禁区" |
When Zifang declares loyalty to Han Fei, Fourth Son initially declines to support his younger brother, but Zifang convinces him to agree. Meanwhile, Han Yu tries to moderate the Emperor's frustration with Ninth Son, Han Fei, who essentially has uncovered the Emperor's destruction of Baiyue in the past by using the Blood Marquess to further his own ambitions. Wei Zhuang muses on recent events with Han Fei, including the prison break and fire on the outskirts of the city and people and events that should be dead or forgotten. Suddenly, Honglian arrives with some wine for Han Fei confined to the Cold Palace, a place for discarded concubines. Her access is only achieved because Wei Zhuang took care of the guards, and she is intrigued about this mysterious strong friend of Han Fei.
| 23 | "Under a Collapsing Wall - 危墙之下" |
The Emperor is bewildered be a group of people gathered outside the palace. Fourth Brother explains that they are former Baiyue slaves, grateful for shelter from the Chu, but Ji Wuye says they are of no use to the Han. The prime Minister recommends that they stay, and the Emperor accedes, however he is still angry at Ninth Son for acting without his approval. In an audience with the Emperor, Han Fei is given some credit for his actions, but is told that he must deal with Li Kai. In a later discussion with Fourth Brother, Han Fei is reminded of the risky path he has chosen in pursuing the Liu Yi case. Then, Fourth Brother receives a message that Li Kai has been found and surrounded by his men. He asks Han Fei to kill him but he declines. However, as Minister of Criminal Justice Han Fei must enforce the law.
| 24 | "The Wind Leaves no Trace - 风过无痕" |
Li Kai is trapped high on a building and about to be executed by a volley of arrows, but he decides to fall to his death rather than the Han army have his blood on their arrows. Over the body, Fourth Brother happily declares the case closed. Meanwhile, Ji Wuye commands that the body be confirmed and Wujiu eliminated. Zinu tries to comfort Lady Wu and reveals that Nong Yu is her long-lost daughter, confirmed by her gemstone of Raining Fire and they are tearfully reunited. In the cemetery, Li Kai wakes up, surprised to be alive, his life saved by Zinu and Wei Zhuang who switched bodies as he fell from the rooftop. Li Kai kowtows three times to Han Fei in gratitude for saving his life and the subterfuge of his death as it insulates his former wife and daughter from the dangers of being associated with him. Han Fei presents Lady Wu and Nong Yu with Li Kai's sword vowing that he will not be forgotten, not revealing that he is still alive.
| 25 | "Hundreds of Ghosts in the Night - 百鬼夜行" |
Moya and Baifeng watch a ghostly procession in the night of figures carrying Qu Shimo, a demon-like figure on a palanquin. Ji Wuye's men dig up Li Kai's grave and realize that it is not his body, but that of Wujiu. As they turn to leave, a zombie-like Wujiu appears and kills them both. Qu Shimo alights from the palanquin, takes control of the Wujiu zombie. He then raises the dead from their graves within the cemetery and they advance on Moya and Baifeng. Rather than stay and fight, they report the sighting to General Ji Wuye and tell him the body in the grave was that of Wujiu who is now a zombie. The Blood Marquess says the word in Baiyeu and Chu is that someone can control corpses, Qu Shimo. In the Cold Palace, a female assassin enters Han Fei's quarters and attacks him, but she is intercepted by Wei Zhuang.
| 26 | "Sand Accumulates to Form a Tower - 聚沙成塔" |
The old Baiyue shaman, Bai Duwang approaches at the Baiyue refugee camp set up by the Han Emperor, and releases magic snakes. Then the Crown Prince of Baiyue, Tain Ze arrives saying they do not deserve to be part of the new Baiyue and mercilessly kills them all. Meanwhile Wei Zhuang disarms the sword-wielding assassin in Han Fei's quarters with only one hand. She is revealed to be Nong Yu who wants to join Quicksand and take revenge on Ji Wuye. Impressed by her conviction, Han Fei agrees to give here a trial. The next day, Han Fei and Zifang sadly inspect the dead Baiyue people at the decimated Baiyue refugee camp.
| 27 | "The Charm of Wildfire - 磷火之魅" |
When Han Fei and Zifang investigate the bodies at the Baiyue refugee camp, they deduce that they were killed with a violent poison, and most probably from the Baiyue themselves who have a reputation for skills with poison and mind control. In the palace, before the Emperor, Ji Wuye attributes the lapse in security to Han Fei. Suddenly Yanling Ji appears in the room and asks if the Emperor remembers Red Eyebrows Dragon Snake. With little effort, she takes care of the Imperial Guards who attack her and she leaves. At the same time, Wushuang Gui assaults the home of the Crown Prince who is now missing. Ji Wuye seeks to attribute the chaos to Han Fei, but the Prime Minister suggests that the General is also at fault. Fourth Brother suggests negotiating with the Baiyue until they can formulate a plan to defeat them, and that Ji Wuye and Han Fei must work together to achieve it. The Emperor agrees, and Han Fei is placed in charge, but he is also given the responsibility of safely retrieving the Crown Prince.
| 28 | "Red Eyebrows Dragon Snake - 赤眉龙蛇" |
Wushuang Gui is shown attacking the Crown Prince's Home wielding a stone column, against whom the Han troops are completely ineffective, leaving the Crown Prince alone. When reinforcements arrive Qu Shimo uses his mind control powers to destroy them and the fearful Crown Prince begs for his life. Fourth Son assigns Han Qiancheng to assist Han Fei retrieve the Crown Prince, thus removing himself from the action and heaping more responsibility for the outcome on Han Fei.
| 29 | "Pulling Chestnuts out of the Fire - 火中取栗" |
Zifang's research of records shows a blank period during the battle with the Baiyue suggesting a deliberate intention to conceal the events. He reports that the Crown Prince of Baiyue, Tian Ze, also named Red Eyebrows Dragon Snake, was a powerful sorcerer and attracted agents with exotic talents. He apparently disappeared when the Han and Chu subdued the Baiyue. Zinu surmises that he was held prisoner within the city raising the question of who was his captor, and also his liberator. A masked figure who can control cold and ice approaches the house of the Crown Prince and encounters Yanling Ji. As Tian Ze appears, he is told that his masters still control him, and that his revenge should be confined to their agreement. The masked figure leaves behind a small bottle as a sign of a shackle that cannot be broken between them. Later, General Ji Wuye's troops surround the home of the Crown Prince and he also sends Moya to help Han Fei with the rescue.
| 30 | "Luring the Enemy by Showing Weakness - 示弱引虚" |
Outside the home of the Crown Prince, there is an uneasy alliance between the Han forces. Moya comments to Wei Zhuang and that Tang Qi has expanded his power since the Qi Jue Clan took over the Duxie territory. Inside, the Crown Prince fearfully awaits his fate. Surveillance shows that the house is defended by three subordinates: Bai Duwang, Yanling Ji and Wushuang Gui. There is no sign of Tian Ze or Qu Shimo, but Wei Zhuang warns that they could be trying to lure the enemy by showing weakness and there could be hidden dangers as only three of the four gates appear to be defended. Moya and Wei Zhuang gain entry and meet Wushuang Gui. Wei Zhuang attacks and finds the huge Baiyue fighter a formidable foe, meanwhile outside, a suspicious group of troops join the defensive perimeter.
| 31 | "Driving Ghosts to Devour the Mind - 驱鬼噬心" |
Waiting outside the home of the Crown Prince, Han Fei apparently gets bored and heads off to get more wine, much to the concern of Han Qiancheng. Inside the walls, Wei Zhuang finds Wushuang Gui almost invulnerable, but by attacking the same point many times, he manages to cripple the huge Baiyue fighter. Also inside, Moya approaches the Crown Prince and is apparently attacked by snakes, however he realizes that he is being targeted by Bai Duwang's poison magic. Elsewhere, Tian Ze and Qu Shimo try to extract information from the zombie Wujiu who can only say the words "Liu Yi" and "Seven Mansions of the Azure Dragon". Tian Ze states that the blood debts of the Ghost Army of the Zheng State will soon be settled. Meanwhile in the palace, Honglian detects someone heading towards the Cold Palace and Han Fei secretly meets with Zinu.
| 32 | "Asking the Weight of the Tripods - 王权问鼎" |
Han Fei tells Zinu that the Cold Palace was the former imperial palace of Duke Zhuang in the prosperous Zheng State. His rise in power marked the beginning of a chaotic era, and challenging the old order by asking the weight of the legendary and symbolic Nine Tripod Cauldrons. Han Fei says this to Zinu by way of trying to understand Tian Ze's motives, that maybe his target is not really the Crown Prince, but the Emperor in the Imperial Palace, the Cold Palace lying between the two locations. Just as Zinu is becoming bored with the history lesson, Tian Ze appears, and Han Fei provocatively asks if he is after revenge or the treasure. Suddenly Qu Shimo attacks Han Fei from behind, but he is foiled by Zinu with her snake sword Chilian. Han troops then arrive, part of a contingency plan arranged earlier by Han Fei. However they are ineffective against Baiyue magic, presenting a dire situation for the Ninth Son, Han Fei and his ally, Zinu.
| 33 | "Sealed Nilin in the Cold Palace - 宫冷锁鳞" |
As Tian Ze and Qu Shimo use their sorcery to defeat the Han troops, a mysterious white-haired figure appears who is the embodiment of the broken sword Nilin. He neutralizes the efforts of the two Baiyue warriors and Tian Ze fights back. Tian Ze battles Nilin which has the ability to shatter and reform at will, but Tian Ze eventually gains the upper hand although his body suffers the effects of the attacks. Tian Ze re-animates the dead Han soldiers who again attack Han Fei and Zinu, but Wei Zhuang appears at the last moment and saves them. Wei Zhuang questions if Han Fei's battle plan is to rely on Wei Zhuang to repeatedly save him. At that moment Honglian appears and as she greets Han Fei, she is shrouded in green mist by Qu Shimo and captured by Tian Ze.
| 34 | "Honglian Burning in Fire - 业火红莲" |
Wei Zhuang tells Han Fei that Tian Ze used sorcery to interrogate the resurrected Wujiu during which he mentioned the astrological technique of the Yin-Yang School, "Seven Mansions of the Azure Dragon". Zinu says that Tian Ze is after the Raining Fire Gemstone treasure, and that Ji Wuye's Nightfall group is tracking it down. Wei Zhuang surmises that Tian Ze's motives may be different to those of Wujiu and Liu Yi. When Han Fei arrives at the palace, he is prevented from entering by Prime Minister Zhang Liang who says that the Han Empire is facing a storm of blood and terror and that Han Fei is at the centre. Meanwhile Feicui Hu and General Ji Wuye are gambling together in the palace, Wei Zhuang asks Tang Qi to trace the owner of a bracelet he found, Bai Yifei decides to go horse-riding, and Honglian awakes in a prison watched by Qu Shimo.
| 35 | "Trouble Brewing Within the Household - 萧墙云变" |
Han Fei's Quicksand debate the increasing power and influence of Ji Wuye and the Nightfall group and the possibility that the abduction of the Crown Prince may have just been part of a bigger plot to seize power by competing factions. Han Fei decides that since he has been cast in a pivotal role, he will try to determine the outcome. Zifang visits the Fourth Prince and shows him a broken halberd, signifying "winner take all", suggesting his position may be under threat. When the Fourth Prince rushes to the palace he finds Ji Wuye in charge. Continuing their speculation, Wei Zhuang and Zinu conclude that the Emperor and Crown Prince may be in danger. Meanwhile Bai Yifei goes to meet a mysterious stranger on the lake and Honglian is visited by Yanling Ji in her prison cell.
| 36 | "Stay Still if Startled - 止静若惊" |
The Fourth Prince and Ji Wuye discuss recent events and the risks to the Emperor. The Fourth Prince warns Ji Wuye of the risks of gambling for high stakes. Honglian attacks Yanling Ji in her cell, but is not strong enough. Tian Ze comes in to tell Yanling Ji to stop playing and he teaches Honglian the meaning of her name, that the red lotus is a flower of vengeance. Meanwhile Wei Zhuang frees Wushuang Gui from prison.
| 37 | "Phantom Murderer - 幻杀惑影" |
Still trying to rescue the Crown Prince, Moya endlessly battles imaginary wraiths created by Bai Duwang's poison. At the palace, the Fourth Prince and Prime Minister Zhang question Ji Wuye about how his troops arrived in force only after Tian Ze had left. Meanwhile at the home of the Crown Prince, Han Qiancheng kills the zombie guards and sends a signal for the Han troops to enter. Han Fei meets up with the Fourth Prince, Prime Minister Zhang and Ji Wuye to discuss the current situation. With the Emperor absent from imperial court and the Crown Prince captured, he proposes a temporary head of state be nominated. They agree, and appoint the Fourth Prince, much to Ji Wuye's displeasure. Moya eventually manages to resist Bai Duwang's poison and conquer his fears, striking back at Bai Duwang and wounding him. However Moya is still too weak to continue and sends Baifeng to stop Bai Duwang and rescue the Crown Prince.
| 38 | "The Pearl Hangs in the Dark - 明珠垂暗" |
Zinu sends Nong Yu to the palace to report on what is happening. Meanwhile Baifeng encounters the archer Han Qiancheng, trying to kill the Crown Prince whom Baifeng only just manages to save from a deadly volley of arrows, and then meets up with Moya. Zinu tells Zifang that Han Fei's plans have prevented both the Crown Prince and the Fourth Prince from ascending the throne. Also, that the Emperor may have withdrawn from state affairs because of the activities of Nightfall and the Four Fearful Warriors. Beauty Hu and Nong Yu try to enter the palace, but are turned back by Lady Mingzhu. Bai Yifei's informant tells him that in Xianyang, Li Si has met with Zheng Guo a friend of Han Fei. He does not know the whereabouts of Honglian, but says that Tian Ze may be plotting his own strategy, greater that just knowing the secret of the Raining Fire Manor. Meanwhile Han Fei, along with Zifang, examines the ruins of the Cold Palace and deduces that Tian Ze's purpose was to obtain information from the library about the Gemstone of Raining Fire, Ghost Army Blocking the Road and Seven Mansions of the Azure Dragon to further his desire for the restoration of his land.
| 39 | "Lotus in a Poisonous Pit - 万蠱池莲" |
Wei Zhuang confronts the Baiyue, Wushuang Gui, Qu Shimo, Bai Duwang and Yanling Ji who have Honglian as their hostage, then Tian Ze appears. After Wei Zhuang appears to insult Honglian, she no longer wants to be rescued, but Tian Ze gives him a small intricately carved medicine bottle as he turns to leave. Meanwhile Han Fei tells Zifang that he doesn't believe that Tian Ze found what he was looking for in the Cold Palace and decides to arrange a meeting with Tian Ze. meanwhile, the Fourth Prince becomes more suspicious of Ji Wuye's motives and loyalties. Han Fei's group examine the carved medicine bottle, and deduce it indicates a connection between the palace and the Baiyue. Zinu suggests that if the bottle came from the palace, they could ask Nong Yu to investigate. Honglian is returned to her prison which now is filled with deadly snakes.
| 40 | "A Gap Between the Teeth - 唇齿之隙" |
In her prison cell, Honglian is surrounded by snakes, but a hornless dragon snake appears to take control. At the palace, although the Emperor is reportedly not eating, the cooked fish prepared for him by Beauty Hu is returned with its eye missing, the part he likes. The Fourth Prince asks Qiancheng to work with Ji Wuye even though he does not trust the general, but hopes that it may protect the Royal Father from the Baiyue and Nightfall. Meanwhile Ji Wuye tells Feicui Hu that he's been offered Honglian by the Fourth Prince, however Feicui Hu counsels against it and suggests that he support the Crown Prince instead. Moya reports to Ji Wuye that Bai Duwang has transferred the Crown Prince and that there is a possibility that Han Qiancheng may assassinate him. Back in the prison cell, as Honglian is confronted by the hornless dragon snake, a crimson king snake appears to defend her.
| 41 | "A Lotus Born Unbreakable - 莲生无间" |
Using the pretext of delivering cakes, Zifang and Beauty Hu manage to pass the carved medicine bottle to Nong Yu under the watchful eyes of Lady Mingzhu. In Honglian's prison cell, the crimson king snake attacks the hornless dragon snake and after a vicious struggle, the crimson king snake emerges victorious. Meanwhile Nong Yu enters the Royal Incense Room searching for the familiar scent she detects in the carved medicine bottle and finds it, however while there, she witnesses a meeting between Lady Mingzhu and Bai Yifei whom she calls cousin.
| 42 | "Snow-White Clothes like Blood - 雪衣如血" |
Bai Duwang enters Honlian's cell, explaining that there are hundreds of poisonous snakes in the Poisonous Pit who feed on each other, absorbing each other's poison, becoming more toxic and leaving the venomous snakes victorious. Surprisingly as Honglian laments about her situation, the crimson king snake consoles her. She then climbs to a high window to help it escape, but the window is protected by a realgar. She wipes it away, and the snake escapes. As Tang Qi and Wei Zhuang watch Bai Yifei arrest some smiths, presumably for refining utensils for the legendary venomous insects, Tang Qi tells Wei Zhuang that although Bai Yifei made his name in the war with Baiyue, but there is a dark side to him. Meanwhile Bai Yifei and Lady Mingzhu exchange information and potions in the Royal Incense Room. He tells her that General Ji Wuye has been collaborating with the Fourth Prince more closely than before and both desire the throne. This is all overheard by Nong Yu, however as she leaves she suddenly realizes that she has been detected by Bai Yifei.
| 43 | "Cold Jade, Frozen Lotus - 玉冷莲霜" |
Han Fei tells the Fourth Prince and General Ji Wuye that he will support them should anything happen to the Crown Prince. Also that Tian Ze's actions are unpredictable, since being freed from the chains and the technique of the legendary venomous insects that restricted him for so long. Han Fei reveals that he learned this from the carved medicine bottle he obtained from Tian Ze, who will be seeking revenge. In the palace, Bai Yifei now has Nong Yu and the bottle, but Nong Yu manages to convince him that she is working for Tian Ze and that she knows that Bai Yifei was his captor. Meanwhile, Bai Duwang returns to Honglian's cell to kill the crimson king snake. He angrily attacks Honglian for releasing it, but the snake suddenly attacks him to defend her. When he tries to kill the snake Honglian stops him, but the dying snake gives her a small glowing crimson ball. Believing it to be poison, she takes it, but instead of dying she survives, and all the snakes become her servants.
| 44 | "Bloodsucking Spirit Butterflies - 饮血灵蝶" |
Nong Yu frees herself from her shackles and manages to exit Bai Yifei's chambers while Bai Yifei relays his concerns about Tian Ze to Ji Wuye. Nong Yu then finds herself in a tunnel where she finds a woman being slowly drained by red bloodsucking Spirit Butterflies, the fluid being used to produce the "fear" that the Blood Marquess prepared from Baiyue. She steals a chrysalis and the butterflies attack her, cutting her with their razor-sharp wings, but she manages to escape into the streets where she is rescued by the Qi Jue Clan. Han Fei then presents the chrysalis to Tian Ze, offering him the key to freeing himself from his captor, although Tian Ze is reluctant to trust the Ninth Prince.
| 45 | "The Plan Under the Dark Moon - 晦朔相谋" |
Han Fei wants both the Crown Prince and Honglian in exchange for the chrysalis but Tian Ze says it's not enough and he is forced to choose one. Han Fei chooses the Crown Prince but then says he wants Honglian as well. Wei Zhuang takes Honglian from Yanling Ji, while Tian Ze suddenly comes under attack from Bai Yifei using his icy crystals. Meanwhile Wei Zhuang is attacked by Yanling Ji, Bai Duwang, Wushuang Gui and Qu Shimo. He uses both his sword and combat skills to deflect and thwart their attacks, then reminds them that he is not their real enemy. The Baiyue fighters then go to the aid of Tian Ze who is still under attack from Bai Yifei. From a distance Han Fei sees the magnitude of the battle and is concerned about Honglian, but Zifang reassures him that Wei Zhuang's promises will never be broken.
| 46 | "Love is Born with Poison - 情毒相生" |
Wei Zhuang leaves with Honglian, curtly telling her to return to Xinzheng, but instead she follows him. She finds him suffering from a poisonous wound by Bai Duwang and she draws out the poison, but surprisingly he immobilizes her using her pressure points. After a snake approaches her and leaves, he softens a little towards her, but he ignores her pleas to unlock her acupoints. Later a carriage arrives and the attendants unlock Honglian's acupoints and return with her. Meanwhile, as Han Fei and Zifang prepare to return to the palace with the Crown Prince, they see Bai Yifei returning with Yanling Ji as his captive. Honglian arrives back at the palace, angry at what she considers Wei Zhuang's rude behavior, however she decides to forgive him.
| 47 | "The Forest Stops the Wind - 林止风动" |
The Han Emperor is pleased at the return of Crown Prince and Honglian, giving credit to both General Ji and Han Fei although the Fourth Prince assigns all credit to the Ninth Prince, Han Fei. Wei Zhuang agrees to meet Honglian in the Cold Palace to teach her martial arts. On his way home, the Crown Prince's carriage falls off a bridge into the water and he drowns in what is made to look like and accident. General Ji is furious as he believes this is the work of the Fourth Prince, Han Yu. Meanwhile, the Han Prime Minister goes to meet the envoy of the Qin Emperor, but finds the envoy murdered by Tian Ze. Shortly thereafter, Qin troops appear, massed outside the Han Palace. Meanwhile, while visiting the body of the Qin envoy, Han Fei and Zifang are greeted by a new envoy at Xinzheng, Li Si.
| 48 | "Slick Octahedron - 八面玲珑" |
Li Si reminds Han Fei that in the coming negotiations that he will not show any mercy just because they are fellow disciples. Li Si meets the Han Emperor and mentions the lack of respect shown to the Qin over the murdered envoy. General Ji promises to capture the culprit, but Li Si expresses doubt in his ability to do so and offers to use the Qin army waiting outside the gates. Bai Yifei however rejects the offer and insists the Han will deal with the problem, suggesting that if the Han and Qin are engaged in conflict, only the Chu will benefit. Li Si suggests that the Han Emperor accompany the body to Xianyang as a gesture of sincerity however Prime Minister Zhang considers it inappropriate. Han Fei defuses the impasse with some carefully chosen words, but Li Si counters with the proposal that the Han cedes the area of the assassination to the Qin. Han Fei then proposes that if he can solve the case with 10 days or less, the amount of ceded land would be proportional to the time elapsed. Meanwhile Wei Zhuang and Tang Qi learn that eight Qin assassins known as the Slick Octahedron have also crossed into the Han state. Later, Bai Yifei foils an attempt by Yanling Ji to escape from prison.
| 49 | "Unwon Victory - 不胜之胜" |
The Fourth Prince suggests that Han Fei took a big risk with his proposal to Li Si, but Han Fei shows his skill in a game with coins called "Unwon Victory" where the player in the weaker position can use the opponent's greed to defeat them. He suggests that the power of the Qin Prime Minister is strong, whereas that of the ruler is weak. In the Cold Palace Wei Zhuang gives Honglian her first lesson martial arts, trust no-one, stay on guard and never relax. Meanwhile Bai Yifei uses frightening visions from Yanling Ji's past to break her will and hoping she would reveal the location of her master, Tian Ze.
| 50 | "Sword Art in the Heavenly Hinge - 问剑天枢" |
Wei Zhuang and Tang Qi find four men of the Qi Jue Clan killed by a single assassin, leaving one survivor who was in hiding. Tang Qi decides to lays a trap with Wei Zhuang as bait to catch the swordsman. That night, the surviving Qi Jue Clan member overhears the assassins talking with the woman Li Wu, but he is easily detected and killed. Meanwhile as Wei Zhuang walks the dark lane-ways, he is ambushed by four swordsmen, but he quickly dispatches them. Later he encounters another swordsmen at a place referred to as the Heavenly Hinge, the only place in Xinzheng that is both offensive and defensive. They are evenly matched and they fight to a standstill, the swordsman revealed as Wei Zhuang's Senior Brother.
| 51 | "A Leaf Falls, Autumn Begins - 一叶知秋" |
Wei Zhuang introduces his Senior Brother, Ge Nie, to Han Fei who had already deduced who he was. After an awkward introduction, Han Fei impresses the skeptical Ge Nie with his wisdom and understanding of politics and power. Later, in a small, secluded garden Han Fei meets a man wearing white robes and a mask. They have a philosophical discussion about the existence of a power beyond mortals which controls their fates. Then, Han Fei pays his respects to the Emperor of Qin, Ying Zheng, who then removes his mask.
| 52 | "Walking Beside the Abyss - 临渊而行" |
General Ji declares a curfew in Xinzheng while Wei Zhuang and Ge Nie speculate on the purpose of presence of the Slick Octahedron. Meanwhile, in the garden, Han Fei cautions Ying Zheng on the dangers of travelling to Xinzheng and in return, Ying Zheng refers to the section in Han Fei's essay referring to the dangers of officials with too much influence. That night, two carriages leave the house where Han Fei met Ying Zheng and are stopped and searched by General Ji's men, however they find no sign of their quarry, the Emperor of Qin. At the same time, General Ji meets Ge Nie and asks him to surrender his sword for safety.
| 53 | "Dreamy Past - 如梦如昔" |
Tian Ze and Wushuang appear to break into Bai Yifei's prison and free Yanling Ji. General Ji finds Li Si in Ge Nie's carriage, but he allows them to pass. On the rooftops, the Slick Octahedron observes Wei Zhuang and Ying Zheng, who are disguised as a Han soldiers. Zhen Hou of the Slick Octahedron discuss Ying Zheng's fighting style which involves his unusually long sword. At the Cold Palace, Tian Ze tells Yanling Ji that he suspects that the treasure of Baiyue and key to the Seven Mansions of the Azure Dragon are both located there; the location of an old imperial palace that belonged to the former overlord, Duke Zhuang of Zheng. Suddenly Yanling Ji slaps Tian Ze, realizing that he is in fact Bai Yifei in disguise and the situation is an illusion created by Lady Mingzhu. Meanwhile, Ge Nie, Ying Zheng, Wei Zhuang, Zinü and Han Fei meet at the Purple Orchid House, but Zinü detects that they are being watched by the surveillance bees of Xun Feng of the Slick Octahedron. She kills the bees, however when they do not return, Xun Feng deduces the location of Ying Zheng.
| 54 | "Killing Four Birds with One Stone - 一石四鸟" |
Li Si tells the Han Emperor that the 5 of the 10 days to capture the Qin envoy's murderer, and threatens to call in the waiting Qin troops to assist. However Han Fei says that General Ji has already captured the killer, much to Ji's surprise. Han Fei names Bai Yifei's Baiyue prisoner Yanling Ji as the culprit, placing Ji in a compromising position, where he must hand her over to the Qin. Thus, Bai Yifei, General Ji and Li Si are all cleverly manipulated by Han Fei into accepting his solution to avoid apparent failures in fulfilling their appointed roles. Later, Han Fei again meets Ying Zheng who compliments him on his talents; fending off the Great Qin army with wisdom instead of might, snatching Yanling Ji from Nightfall with tricks instead of force, making friends with the Qin envoy without adulation and turning Tian Ze into an ally of Quicksand without concession.
| 55 | "To Abandon is to Attack - 弃子造劫" |
The Han Emperor calls for Yanling Ji to be brought to the palace while the Slick Octahedron plan their next move to assassinate Ying Zheng. As Han Fei analyses the current situation, he suggests that the threat to Ying Zheng may come from within the Qin Empire. They also realize that Ying Zheng's habit of holding a longsword was how the Slick Octahedron eventually discovered them. Meanwhile, Bai Yifei delivers Yanling Ji to Li Si as requested, supervised by Ge Nie.
| 56 | "Dance on the Palm of the Hand - 掌中迷舞" |
Han Fei is entertained by Yanling Ji. Later, he inspects the former hideout of the Slick Octahedron and finds a rotten apple, left to disguise the scent of tea preferred by Chengjiao, which they later found out. Meanwhile General Ji and Bai Yifei plot the removal of Han Fei at the Purple Orchid House with the assistance of the Slick Octahedron. At the Purple Orchid House, Zifang and Han Fei discusses with Ying Zheng that his younger brother, Chengjiao, may have something to do with the Slick Octahedron because of a certain tea Chengjiao loved. Then the Ghost Valley people, Wei Zhuang and Ge Nie, detect the presence of their enemies, but at that moment Han Fei is summoned to the palace. Suspecting a trap, Han Fei nevertheless enters a waiting carriage and is taken away.
| 57 | "The Night of Fire - 夜火之夜" |
Tang Qi is told of incidents at east and west streets targeting the Qi Jue Clan and sends reinforcements, but it's a ploy by Moya to wipe out the clan. Meanwhile, Li Si and Ge Nie's carriage is stopped at the palace gates by General Ji's troops and told that they are to be escorted to the embassy. While investigating the attack on the Qi Jue Clan Wei Zhuang encounters Moya. Meanwhile, as Han Fei is taken by carriage to the palace alone, he thinks back to his encounter with Yanling Ji and her attempt to extract information from him and her queries about why he has the Nilin Sword. Han Fei then realizes that his carriage is taking a different route and not directly to the palace. At the Purple Orchid House, Chengjiao appears, while in the streets, Wei Zhuang prepares to fight Moya and his assassins on the rooftops.
| 58 | "Spying Shadow Cai Die - 蝶影之谍" |
With Wei Zhuang missing, the Qi Jue Clan out of action and Han Fei called away to the palace, Zinu concludes that Ying Zheng in the Purple Orchid House is Nightfall's real target. Zifang suggests that they empty the Purple Orchid House of guests, but Nong Yu stays, disguised as Zinu. Meanwhile, Chengjiao secretly meets Cai Die inside. At the palace gates, Fourth Brother insists that General Ji's troops allow Li Si and Ge Nie's carriage also containing Ying Zheng and Zinu to enter. The troops refuse, so to defuse the tense situation, Fourth Brother invites Li Si to his house. Meanwhile General Ji arrives at the Purple Orchid House and is surprisingly greeted by Cai Die who shares a secret with him and he departs. However, Zifang and Nong Yu who is disguised as Zinu find the real Cai Die dead in her room, and suspect the Slick Octahedron have entered the premises. Elsewhere, Han Fei is led into a room in a small annex and told to wait. Moya's assassins attack Wei Zhuang who easily defeats them, until Beifang attacks and matches Wei Zhuang in skill and speed. Meanwhile, the Slick Octahedron infiltrates the Purple Orchid House. In the annex room, Han Fei slides open a door and is shocked to see Lady Mingzhu.
| 59 | "Alive in Deadlock - 生逢死局" |
Han Fei realizes that he is in Lady Mingzhu's chambers and has fallen into a trap. Meanwhile, the Fourth Prince entertains Li Si at his home, while at the Purple Orchid House, Chengjiao, backed by the Slick Octahedron, demands that Ying Zheng be handed over. On the rooftops, Wei Zhuang is still fully occupied fighting Beifang and Moya who continue to press their attacks. At Fourth Brother's house, he presses Li Si to stay drinking for three days. As the Han Emperor is about to enter his consort Lady Mingzhu's chambers, Honglian intercepts him and artfully draws him away, saving Han Fei the acute embarrassment and punishment of being found inside her chambers. At the Purple Orchid House Zifang has documentation that Chengjiao died in Tunliu and he has the a green jade ring given to Chengjiao by his father, King Zhuangxiang, as a keepsake, proving the man before him is an impostor. Exposed, the impostor again demands that Zifang hands over Ying Zheng, but Zinu says that he has fallen into their trap instead.
| 60 | "Sound of Silence - 万籁俱寂" |
As Lady Mingzhu threatens Han Fei, the spirit of the Nilin Sword appears and stops her. Meanwhile, the Fourth Prince continues to delay Ge Nie and Li Si at his home, but Ge Nie manages to leave safely with Li Si without causing a diplomatic incident. At the Purple Orchid House Zifang and Nong Yu confront the members of the Slick Octahedron alone. Moya and his assassins along with Baifeng make a final assault on Wei Zhuang, but he defeats them. Zifang asserts that the Slick Octahedron as a single assassin that has incorporated the identities of the people he has slain, and alleges that three people were involved in the death of Chengjiao; General Bi from Qin, who was defending Tunliu, Li Wu, the dancer at Chengjiao's side and Xun Feng and Qian Sha, the two-faced assassin. Meanwhile, Han Fei prepares to farewell Ying Zheng, warning him that dangers lurk for him with the Qin Empire. Ying Zheng in turn proposes that together they could rule 99% of the world, a world ruled by law and enlightened by Confucianism, but Han Fei does not accept. Wei Zhuang returns to the Purple Orchid House and Goujian, King of Yue, turns out to be the true executioner in the Slick Octahedron, who wields with the twin Black and White Xuan Jian swords. He and Wei Zhuang begin to cross swords, however they are interrupted by Yanling Ji. She prepares to leave with Zifang and Nong Yu, but is stopped by Bai Yifei. Later, Han Fei and Zinu share a quiet moment and discuss the political situation and the uncertain future with a number of powerful players.
| 61 | "The Collapsing World - 不周将倾" |
As Ying Zheng returns to Qin territory with Li Si and Ge Nie he states that there will be no alliance with the Han and his only option is to win both territories. As the Purple Orchid House burns and crashes down around them, Wei Zhuang and Xuan Jian continue to fight while Yanling Ji keeps Bai Yifei at bay. Meanwhile General Ji Wuye and Feicui Hu congratulate themselves on the success of the Net Trap organization. Bai Yifei eventually traps Yanling Ji but he comes under attack from Bai Duwang and Qu Shimo. He encases them in ice, fatally wounding Bai Duwang, but he is interrupted by the appearance of Tian Ze.
| 62 | "Cold Edge and Freezing Fire - 芒寒焰冷" |
Tian Ze frees Qu Shimo and confronts Bai Yifei while Wushuang Gui appears and attacks Xuan Jian. Wushuang Gui is wounded, but he leaves with Zifang and Nong Yu, clearing a path through Ji Wuye's troops and assisted by Zinu on the rooftops. The meet up with Han Fei who sends them to his house for protection, saying that he has another powerful ally. Inside the Purple Orchid House, Tian Ze, Yanling Ji and Qu Shimo attack Bai Yifei who still seeks the treasure of Baiyue. Xuan Jian launches an all-out attack on Wei Zhuang and disarms and wounds him, sending him crashing to the ground. As he is about to kill Wei Zhuang and make him part of his soul, Ge Nie appears above them on a rooftop.
| 63 | "Undying Ashes - 余烬未竟" |
Using his position of Minister of Criminal Justice, Han Fei confronts General Ji Wuye's troops in the street and accuses them of not protecting the city from the spreading fire. However, Ji Wuye asserts that they are busy chasing Baiyue rebels. Prime Minister Zhang Kaidi then approaches and Ji Wuye asserts that his grandson, Zhang Liang, has been conspiring with the Baiyue but Zifang contradicts his account. Meanwhile, Ge Nie attacks Xuan Jian and during the fight, he collapses the part of the roof, and rescues Wei Zhuang, ending the other battles raging inside the building. Outside, Fourth Brother intervenes between Han Fei and Ji Wuye and directs the general to commit his troops to extinguishing the fire to which he reluctantly agrees. Bai Yifei then reports that Bai Duwang and Cai Die are dead inside the ruins. Fourth Brother attributes the death of Cai Die to the fire, closing the case and stifling further discussion.
| 64 | "Enemies in the Game - 弈棋亦敌" |
Fourth Brother successfully resolves the impasse between Ji Wuye and Han Fei while Ge Nie escapes from Xuan Jian with the badly injured Wei Zhuang. At the smouldering ruins of the Purple Orchid House, Han Fei congratulates Zifang for resisting the Slick Octahedron and promises Zinu that he will assist in construction of a replacement. Later, Han Fei and Zinu visit Tian Ze and Yanling Ji and agree that if they are not allies, they at least have a common enemy. However, and Tian Ze leaves Yanling Ji to monitor Han Fei. Meanwhile, Wei Zhuang visits Tang Qi's grave and is approached by Honglian who tries to console him, but he rebuffs her and burns Tang Qi's grave marker, saying that a veteran's name does not need remembering, just the battlefield where they died.
| 65 | "The Lost Tablet Locked by Blood - 血锁迷碑" |
As Han Fei's group discuss the surprise appearance of Xuan Jian and Wei Zhuang thinks back to three years earlier when he and Ge Nie underwent a Ghost Valley trial to assess their determination and decisiveness. They arrived at a Wei village which appeared deserted and they saw a stone tablet sliced in half by a powerful sword stroke. Suddenly they came under attack by flaming arrows aimed at barrels of oil. Ge Nie attacked the archers while Wei Zhuang deflected their arrows. They captured the leader, Wei Yong who had been told that they were Qin warriors. He told them that a killer had been murdering village residents each night, apparently without reason, either to create fear or because of a grudge.
| 66 | "The Web That Hunts the Soul - 悬丝猎魄" |
Continuing the flashback, Ge Nie and Wei Zhuang examined the dead villagers and questioned a witness about the killer and his sword, which appears to be black. Suddenly they came under attack from a fast moving and shadowy assailant who evaded even their best efforts to stop him. After killing the witness, he escaped, warning Ge Nie and Wei Zhuang not to meddle in other people's business. However, they realized the sword was one of a pair known as Xuan Jian; one black, Xuan, to suppress souls and one white, Jian, for protection. They are the fourth ranking swords of a set of eight swords forged by Ou Yezi for the king of Yue. They also saw that the swordsman had the unique spider tattoo of Net Trap on his hand. Back in the present, Wei Yong reveals that he is the Minister of Public Works of the Wei State and he has been a thorn in the side of Qin for some time. He asks the travellers to help him seek justice and Ge Nie and Wei Zhuang debate the appropriate course of action as justice can have different interpretations. Later, at a pre-arranged signal, four wagons set off in opposing directions to lure Xuan Jian into the open. Net Trap operatives destroy the wagons, however Xuan Jian finally reveals himself.
| 67 | "A Girl's Tender Dream - 伊人纤梦" |
Xuan Jian finds himself surrounded by Wei swordsmen, but he easily dismisses them and attacks Ge Nie and Wei Zhuang. After the initial encounter, Xuan Jian advises them to leave, but Ge Nie asks why he has reappeared. Xuan Jian thinks back to a year earlier when a death list was circulated, apparently by the Qin to eliminate important Wei civil and martial ministers. Although the King of Wei was concerned by these attacks, he was cheered when Dian Qing reported that his army pushed back the Qin army 50 kilometers at Yangping. As a reward, the king presented him with personal sword as an accolade. However, the death list was actually created by the Minister of Public Works, Wei Yong, to eliminate his political rivals. He had pressured Xuan Jian to carry out the killings because of his love for Wei's daughter Xian Xian who had nursed him when he was dying and who was also carrying their child. However, when the child was born her father took it away, causing Xuan Jian to now seek vengeance.
| 68 | "Death and Oaths - 逝者誓者" |
Xuan Jian's, recollections continues, and after disposing of everyone on Wei Yong's list, Xuan Jian expected to leave with Xian Xian and their child. Instead, he was forced to fight Chiliarch Dian Qing. Suddenly, Xian Xian grabbed Xuan Jian's white sword from her father and threw it to Xuan Jian, then leaped from the ramparts into the arena below. Wei Yong ordered them both shot with flaming arrows which Xuan Jian managed to deflect, however Xian Xian was fatally wounded by Dian Qing. Xuan Jian managed to escape with the dying Xian Xian, but they fell into an icy lake. Xuan Jian was prepared to die with Xian Xian but his thirst for vengeance triggered his desire to survive.
| 69 | "The Heartless Threads - 情丝无情" |
Back in the present, Xuan Jian continues his attack on Ge Nie and Wei Zhuang, slightly wounding them before escaping. Ge Nie and Wei Zhuang deduce that they were not wounded by Xuan Jian's swordsmanship, but by an invisible trap laid beforehand by someone else, and suspect Wu Qingsi, an assassin who has joined Net Trap. She reveals herself and tightens the razor sharp threads. Ge Nie grabs the invisible threads, cutting his hand, but using his blood to reveal their position and Wei Zhuang cuts them both free. They pursue Xuan Jian to save the treacherous Wei Yong only because of his ability to hold back the Qin forces and manage to reach him before Xuan Jian can kill him. However, earlier Wei Yong had engaged Yan Ri of Net Trap to protect him, offering the Wei army's support in return for his help.
| 70 | "Vertical and Horizontal - 合纵连横" |
Yan Ri intercepts Xuan Jian and tells him that Wei Yong must survive and that his new targets are now the disciples of Ghost Valley, Ge Nie and Wei Zhuang. The Black Widow, Wu Qingsi, tries to help Xuan Jian, but she is killed instead by Net Trap on Yan Ri's orders. Ge Nie and Wei Zhuang again engage Xuan Jian, but this time, they use the twin attacks of Vertical and Horizontal to defeat him and he prepares to join Xian Xian in death. Following the battle, Ge Nie and Wei Zhuang wonder if they are still being tested and discuss the issue of possibly having to face each other in the future to determine who will be the Ghost Valley successor.
| 71 | "A Decision Leads to a Thousand Questions - 策引千问" |
Wei Yong and his village are saved by Ge Nie and Wei Zhuang but Wei Yong is immediately summoned to Daliang to assume command of the Wei army. Ge Nie and Wei Zhuang return to Ghost Valley with more questions than answers, and the master tells them that everyone thinks they know right from wrong, but the criteria change all the time. For example, they may think that Wei Yong is evil because of his ruthless quest for power, however he will defend the Han against the Qin which is a key role in preserving the balance of power. The master advises that instead of seeking answers they must make their own judgments and decisions, but then deal with the consequences. Meanwhile, Xuan Jian is still alive and he attacks Wei Yong's camp killing his men and slashes the Minister of Public Works. He is then thanked by Qian Sha, second highest in the Net Trap organization who tells Xuan Jian that Chengjiao is the target of their next mission. However, Xuan Jian, believes he died by the swords of Ge Nie and Wei Zhuang, and realizes that he was 're-forged' by Net Trap for their own purposes and he kills Qian Sha. Back at Han Fei's household, Ge Nie and Wei Zhuang reveal that they met Wei Wuji who has taken control of the Wei soldiers.
| 72 | "Like a Rising Sun - 如日方升" |
Han Fei suggests that his Quicksand group enlist the aid of Tian Ze even though that option also presents a risk. He suggests that to combat Nightfall on their own terms, they must employ the same strategies of strength in finance, military, politics, and espionage. He says this means building their own business structure across the seven states supported by capable forces, using his position in court to recommend people of integrity to work as officials and finally, to set up and establish their own intelligence network. The major obstacle is money, however even pooling all their resources, they do not have enough. Han Fei proposes that they target Feicui Hu, the weakest and wealthiest of the Nightfall leaders. To allay Wei Zhuang's concerns of his plan, Han Fei demonstrates his capacity for pre-planning and anticipating the decisions of his adversaries.
| 73 | "Crimson Heart - 赤心似练" |
Honglian offers to join Quicksand, but has trouble convincing the others of her value. However, Zinu suggest that she may be of some use and Honglian chooses the code name Chilian (Crimson Snake), and Zinu offers her the Chilian sword. Han Fei is called before the Han Emperor and the generals Ji Wuye and Bai Yifei watch him being berated for the disturbance he has caused and the release of Yanling Ji. However, Han Fei presents the emperor with a pardon document from the King of Qin for Yanling Ji which silences his critics. They are interrupted by news that Nanyang and Fushu have been hit by crop failures. The ageing emperor decides that he must name a new heir following the death of the Crown Prince. He seeks advice from General Ji and Prime Minister Zhang who are at opposite ends of the balance of power in the court and both are circumspect in their recommendations, of either the Fourth or the Ninth Prince. The emperor calls both princes to the palace, and over dinner and surprisingly seeks their advice on arranging a marriage for Honglian.
| 74 | "Lotus in danger - 莲步危局" |
The Fourth Prince suggests that Honglian should marry a Qin although Han Fei suggests that it would be best if she was not too far from home. Meanwhile, Ninth Prince Han Yu has proposed a birthday celebration for the king, and Ji Wuye and Feicui Hu consider the political implications for themselves. Han Fei doesn't oppose the event, but suspects that Nightfall supports Ninth Prince ascending to the throne, although he doesn't trust them. Han Fei decides to visit Nanyang which is near the Qin border, leaving Wei Zhuang and Zinu in charge of Quicksand, while Zifang continues his research. Han Fei proposes Zhāng Liáng for the powerful position of Royal Steward, which is supported by the Fourth Prince who is aware that the king may be testing people's allegiances. Meanwhile, as Wei Zhuang receives information from Nanyang, Zifang also seeks information in the royal library where he surprisingly encounters Lady Mingzhu.
| 75 | "Human Disaster - 祸起人为" |
Zifang observes that Qin has the poorest land, however it is the most successful in conquering the other six states. Han Fei arrives in Nanyang and finds heavy rain, but the crops have failed people are starving. In the royal library Zifang is being threatened by Lady Mingzhu, but Honglian playfully interrupts them and defuses the situation. In Nanyang, Han Fei discovers that the crops have failed after using fertilizer from a single provider who has a monopoly on supply, however some areas appear unaffected. Han Fei is invited the extremely wealthy Feicui Hu's residence, Emerald Manor, and he becomes suspicious about how Feicui Hu acquired his wealth. Han Fei recalls an earlier discussion with Zifang where they analyzed the Qin's military successes and suggested an alliance would benefit of the Han.
| 76 | "Creamy Skin and Soft Sprouts - 凝脂柔荑" |
Feicui Hu lavishly entertains Han Fei at Emerald Manor in an opulent display of his wealth, including a beautiful young woman with creamy skin and hands like and soft sprouts. Han Fei reveals that the contaminated fertilizer contained quicklime which he suggests is possibly from Feicui Hu's mine, however Feicui Hu denies any involvement. On his departure, Han Fei is offered a dragon jade cup and the severed right hand of the young woman to be his companion. Later, Han Fei is besieged by villagers demanding food, stirred up by an agent of Nightfall. Suddenly, Han soldiers arrive and prepare to kill the villagers, but as tensions increase Yanling Ji arrives and disarms the soldiers. Han Fei and Yanling Ji are then attacked by Nightfall assassins, however Yanling Ji disables them assisted by unknown fighters.
| 77 | "Ravenous Men - 饕餮之徒" |
The unknown fighters are revealed as the Nine Virtues Union based in Nanyang, established with the aid of Zinu and allied with Quicksand. On his return to Xinzheng, Han Fei discovers that food stocks are depleted and that the treasury has been raided by the Fourth Prince to fund the upcoming king's birthday celebration and who refuses to release any of the funds. At the same time, food prices in Xinzheng are rising due to price speculation by an unknown party although Han Fei suspects Feicui Hu. Han Fei also learns that his uncle Lord Jinglun was bankrupted by Feicui Hu and supervised by the Iron Blood Alliance who oversee financial arrangements within the Seven Kingdoms.
| 78 | "The Tiger's Mouth Is Like an Abyss - 虎口如渊" |
The Quicksand group realize that Feicui Hu is supporting the Fourth Prince and controlling food supplies which is creating a crisis for Han Fei. Han Fei approaches Feicui Hu and asks for food but he refuses, saying that it has been purchased for the military. In a daring gambit, Han Fei bets against Feicui Hu that the price of food will fall in 10 days, and agrees to the wager being guaranteed by the Iron Blood Alliance.
| 79 | "Stones From Other Hills - 他山之石" |
Feicui Hu accepts Han Fei's bet that the price of food will fall in 10 days and wages 10 to 1 against Han Fei's 1,000 units of gold. Zinu is furious about the wager, however Han Fei indicates that he has a plan. Han Fei, seeks an audience with Empress Dowager Leiling of the State of Wei in Daliang, accompanied by Honglian who is the granddaughter of Leiling's sister. When Han Fei tries to buy food from the Empress Dowager, Feicui Hu's agent arrives and offers a higher price, but Honglian cleverly embarrasses the agent and turns the Empress Dowager against him.
| 80 | "Asking for Directions at a Dead End - 末路问道" |
Empress Dowager Leiling of the State of Wei agrees to sell food to Han Fei at a reasonable price, and Han Fei asks that Feicui Hu's agent be spared instead of being killed and handed over to him. The Empress Dowager is aware that she has been manipulated by Han Fei and Honglian, however she proceeds with the agreement on the condition that the down-payment arrives within two days. As Han Fei and Zinu return to Xinzheng with a laden wagon train, they are stopped at the border, but the wagons are found to be full of firewood instead of food. Wei Zhuang accompanies another wagon train through the mountains and are intercepted by Moya, Baifeng and Nightfall. Although Wei Zhuang manages to drive them off, Baifeng sets the wagons alight, burning the cargo. However, the food is actually being transported on a third route directly to Nanyang by Yanling Ji, who is pretending to be Ji Wuye's future concubine, with the presence of Feicui Hu's agent as a cover.
| 81 | "The Decision of Xinling - 信陵之抉" |
Han Fei entertains the minister responsible for the king's birthday celebration, but "borrows" his official sigil to access the treasury. Meanwhile, the warehouse storing the food collected by Han Fei is suspiciously set alight while being guarded by Ji Wuye's palace guards. In desperation, Han Fei has Wei Zhuang and the Nine Virtues Union raid the military warehouse and steal wagon loads of food which he sends to the people of Nanyang. With this theft of military stores, Feicui Hu believes that Han Fei is doomed. Meanwhile Han Fei uses the money he stole from the treasury to make the first payment to the merciless Iron Blood Alliance.
| 82 | "A Struggle Between Life and Death - 成败一搏" |
On the 10th day since the wager, Han Fei begins releasing bags of rice into the market lowering the price slightly, but Feicui Hu begins buying it to force the price back up. More food floods into the market as other regions are attracted by the high price, forcing Feicui Hu to buy even more to maintain the price. However, the price eventually falls, and although Han Fei wins the bet with Feicui Hu, he is called to the palace to answer for his actions. When Han Fei is accused of stealing military rations, he answers that he simply moved them for protection. He also explains that the rice was not stored in the burned warehouse and has been distributed in Nanyang. Also, he explains that he commandeered food that had been purchased in the name of the military, but instead wad hidden and not declared, so he used it to supplement the food relief sent to Nanyang. He indirectly accuses General Ji Wuye of the subterfuge.
| 83 | "The Waters of Forgetfulness - 忘川如斯" |
Han Fei speculates that if the Qin attacked, because of the division among the king's advisers, would the Han be best advised to fight back or negotiate a peace? Continuing his defense in court, Han Fei admits to appropriating money from the treasury, however he says that it was for an investment, and returns the gold including an additional 30%. The Empress Dowager arrives in court with Honglian and defends Han Fei's actions as well as strengthening the bonds between Han and Wei. Han Fei's strategy is finally revealed; he planned all along to defeat Feicui Hu by using the food that he and Ji Wuye had secretly hoarded against them. After Han Fei wins the bet against Feicui Hu, the Iron Blood Alliance arrive at the Emerald Manor to exact payment form Feicui Hu and take all of his wealth and lands. Again looking at the big picture, Han Fei again considers the Han dilemma of fighting or appeasing the Qin, and decides there is a third path; to become stronger.
| 84 | "Clouds and the Abyss - 浮云深渊" |
Following the loss of his wealth and lands, Feicui Hu is then imprisoned for hoarding and destroying food. Ji Wuye argues before the king that Han Fei should be punished for his illegal actions, and Han Fei agrees. He is given a sentence of 300 lashes, but after suffering greatly, the king orders that the last 100 are a little softer. When he recovers, Han Fei visits Feicui Hu in prison and reminds him that his own greed was his downfall. Han Fei gives Feicui Hu's former Vision Manor to Zinu as a replacement for the destroyed Purple Orchid House and reveals that Tain Ze had secretly helped him win the bet by operating in the shadows. Zifang reveals that Quicksand gained a total 29,000 units of gold from the venture.
| 85 | "The Loser's Demise - 败者末途" |
Ji Wuye and Bai Yifei decide that Feicui Hu has become a liability, and Bai Yifei visits him in prison and poisons him. At the new Purple Orchid Manor, Quicksand plan their next move and the young woman from Emerald Manor with the severed hand arrives and pledges to serve Han Fei, and Zinu accepts her into the manor. From their high vantage point, Han Fei observes that they can see the seven states. Meanwhile, the Fourth Prince, Han Yu, visits Ji Wuye and suggests that his son may be a suitable match for Honglian. However, Ji Wuye then receives notice from the Prime Minister, Zhang Kaidi, that he is to be impeached from the position of Director of Retainers. As the episode ends, Han Fei muses that although the Han State is small, it plays a critical role in the balance of power between the Seven States.
| 86 | "Unbreakable Pattern - 欲静不止" |
Looking through the historical records, Zifang researches why the militarily successful Qin State suffered a major setback in the battle of Handan. Meanwhile, the Quin Emperor, Ying Zheng, is travelling home with Li Si and they arrive at the fortress of Wusui on the border between Han and Qin States, defended by Wang Yi and his heavy infantry. Meanwhile, Han Fei decides that Quicksand must infiltrate Qin, and selects the capital, Xianyang as its target, however Zinu advises caution. Han Fei offers Wei Zhuang the now vacant post of Director of Retainers, but he declines. Moya risks his life to retrieve a scroll from the lake entitled Azure Dragon and delivers it to Ji Wuye. Zhang Kaidi cautions Zifang about the dangers of becoming involved in court politics, meanwhile, the Fourth Prince is advised of Ji Wuye's removal from office.
| 87 | "The Sound of War - 杀伐之音" |
As preparations are made for the Han King's birthday, Han Fei and Han Yu discuss the appropriateness of the entertainment. Later, Han Fei proposes Wei Zhuang for the now vacant post of Director of Retainers, and the appointment is supported by Zhang Kaidi, but opposed by Ji Wuye and Bai Yifei. The Fourth Prince, Han Yu, has the deciding position and recommends the appointment, as long as he is monitored because he is an outsider. Suddenly, the king receives notice that Wang Yi and Qin troops are massed at the border. At the fortress of Wusui, Wang Yi welcomes the Qin Emperor, Ying Zheng, and kills the scouts who found him. to keep the emperor's presence a secret. However, upon hearing of their deaths, the Chiliarch commander becomes suspicious and realizes that someone important has arrived at the fortress. Back at the Han capital Xinzheng, Han Fei tells Honglian that although Wei Zhuang appears indifferent and domineering, he listens to well-intended advice before he makes decisions and deserves their support.
| 88 | "Observe from Above the Clouds - 疑云瞰晓" |
The Chiliarch commander questions General Wang Yi closely about the deaths of the scouts, but he admits only that Lord Li Si and his entourage are in the camp. However the Chiliarch is still dissatisfied with his response and begins his own investigation. Wang Yi tells Li Si of his concerns for the power struggles in the Qin court, but Li Si consoles Wang Yi that the Empress Dowager and Prime Minister Lu have the situation in hand, and reveals that the Qin Emperor, Ying Zheng had been meeting with the Han. He reveals that they were attacked by the Slick Octahedron, but he suspects that Wang Yi already knows about them. Wang Yi questions how Li Si can serve both the prime Minister and the Emperor whom he sees as having different agendas. Ying Zheng and Ge Nie begin to suspect that Wang Yi may be plotting something of his own. Meanwhile, in Han Fei shares with Wei Zhuang a story which explains that when the situation is unclear, one has to test the waters.
| 89 | "Adversity - 逆局之阙" |
The Chiliarch commander continues his investigation into the mysterious deaths of the five scouts. After examining the bodied, he again questions General Wang Yi who admits that he killed the five scouts, but claims that they were traitors and one had the green jade ring of Chenjiao. Lord Chang’an. He shows the Chiliarch an official letter with the seal of the emperor and claims that his majesty gave him a secret order to slay Mr Shang's team before they arrived. He claims that he allowed them to enter so that he could block any request for reinforcements and to remove Ge Nie's sword without violence to leave him helpless. Meanwhile, Wang Yi sets a trap to assassinate the Qin emperor.
| 90 | "Ask About the World - 与问天下" |
General Wang Yi invites Mr Shang, Li Si and Ge Nie to a meeting, on the pretext that Ge Nie is skilled at locating spies. Wang Yi reminds Shang that his ally, the Empress Dowager married into the Qin family from Zhao, and that Chenjiao, Lord Chang'an was close to Her Highness, inferring that he is close to Chenjiao. He then orders his men to kill the three travelers, however, the Chiliarch commander intercedes to help defend them and re-arms Ge Nie with his sword. A savage battle ensues where Ge Nie fights the troops while the Chiliarch commander fights desperately against Wang Yi. Although he is badly wounded, he manages to defeat the general. The Chiliarch commander is then revealed to be Meng Tien, son of Meng Wu and grandson of Meng Ao who served both King Zhao and King Zhuang. He reveals that he discovered Shang's real identity after he intercepted a letter carried by one of Wang Yi's personal guards, after Wang Yi showed him an official letter which he should have destroyed. He deduced that the letter did not come from Xianyang, but was written within the camp which meant that Ying Zheng, the Emperor of Qin was in the camp. Ying Zheng asks Wang Yi why he betrayed him, and he replies because of the poor treatment of Wu'an, after he advised King Zhao against attacking Handan. Wu'an was then was forced to kill himself after they inventively lost the battle. Wang Yi then poisons himself to join Wu'an in death. When Ying Zheng questions why Li Si did not sacrifice himself to save the emperor during the fight, Li si explains that he was aware of Meng Tien's plan to save him. King Zhao then orders Wang Yi family killed and any associates to be kept under observation. With his loyal companions by his side the emperor takes command, and extends the hand of friendship to Han Fei who must now decide the best course for his own people.
