= List of The Legend of Qin characters =

This is the list of The Legend of Qin characters.

== Main protagonists ==
Jing Tianming (Chinese: 荆天明; pinyin: jīng tiān míng)

He is a bright and cheerful boy, at the age of 12. He is playful and mischievous though protective of his friends. He has a crush on Gao Yue (Yue-er), a girl under the care of Mohists, though he thinks that her big sister, Duanmu Rong, is a cold person whose face is 'stiff as a board'. He treats Ge Nie as his father, and aspires to become a swordsman just like him. He also has a continuous rivalry with Xiang Shaoyu, and a playful relationship with Master Ban. He has a 'passionate' love for food and immediately goes berserk if someone eats his food or destroys it. Although quite shallow in certain aspects, his loyalty, braveness and innocence stand out as some of his more positive traits. Perhaps the most driving aspect of his character, is his belief that his father will return to him one day, thus motivating him to become one of the most famous swordsmen in the world.

Gao Yue (Chinese: 高月; pinyin: gāo yuè)

Gao Yue ( also known as Yue-er) is a princess of the former Yan Kingdom and Yan Dan's daughter and an orphan. She is quite cheerful, playful and generous, as well as kind and innocent. She often gets along easily with almost everyone. She and Tianming are good friends, and she treats Duanmu Rong as her sister, referring her as "Sister Rong". She is extremely bright and intelligent and can analyse things very accurately. She solved many mysteries in the Forbidden Land when nobody else knew the answers. She possesses great talent in Yin-Yang techniques and is taken into the Yin-Yang School by Moon Goddess. She is told that her real name is Ji Ru(Chinese: 姬如; pinyin: jī rú) and her courtesy name is Qianlong(Chinese: 千泷; pinyin: qiān lóng), bearing the same family name as Moon Goddess.

Xiang Shaoyu (Chinese: 项少羽; pinyin: xiàng shǎo yǔ)

Xiang Shaoyu (Chinese: 项少羽; pinyin: xiàng shào yǔ)is from a royal family of a tribe of Chu, and is a brilliant military strategist. He acts both as a brother and rival to Jing Tianming. He and Tianming treat each other as brothers and as rivals. He is quite cheerful, and strives to become a good leader. Shao-Yu is shown to have a superb martial arts skill when fighting when training with his men. He defeated Tian Ming in a short duel and is a brilliant strategist. It is said that Shao-Yu also holds a super human strength with the ability to lift up a solid Bronze cauldron when competing with Big Hammer only with strength and not fighting skills.He is also an orphan.

Shi Lan (Chinese: 石兰; pinyin: shí lán)

A very quiet and mysterious character. She works in Chief Ding's restaurant, but is extremely skilled in martial arts and lightness skills. She is also good at magic arts and once saved Shaoyu and Tianming. Shaoyu seems to have fallen for her. She's real name is Xiao Yu from the Shu tribe. It is highly possible that she is inspired by the historical figure Yu Ji, Xiang Yu's most loved consort. In season 4, she is mentioned to be a Shushan(Chinese: 蜀山; pinyin: shǔ shān) princess.

Duanmu Rong (Chinese: 端木蓉; pinyin: Duānmù Róng)

She makes her official debut in the third episode of season 1. Although, she is portrayed as a cold and emotionless character, she shows sisterly affection to Yue-Er. She is a young lady around the age of 24. Her real name is Duanmu Rong, but is commonly referred to by Yue-Er as "Sister Rong" and treats her like a little sister. She possesses unique medical talents, and is fluent in identifying various diseases and curses. She is mentioned as the most powerful doctor in that era, with a knowledge of a person's pressure points and a wide knowledge of medicine. Although a healer, she refused to treat patients who did not satisfy her conditions: 'Ge' should not be their family name, they should not work for the Qin Empire, they should not be swordsmen. However after she saved the life of the swordsman Ge Nie, she gradually evolved into a more soft-hearted person.She is also proficient in martial arts and uses needles as her weapons. Later at the Mohist School, she was severely wounded defending Ge Nie.

Ge Nie (Chinese: 盖聂; pinyin: gě niè)

Ge Nie is a central character to the plot, approximately 30 years old. His clothes consist of white and gray robes and possesses Rainbow Abyss, the #2 sword in the Sword manual. He is a master of the "Hundred Steps Flying Sword" ( 百步飞剑，pinyin: bǎi bù fēi jiàn）technique and is reputedly the greatest swordsman in the world. He studied in the Gui Gu school Ghost Valley School), a Directionist School of Thought alongside Wei Zhuang. The two students became rivals and fought after Ge Nie was selected to be the master's successor. He was in the employ of the Qin Empire, but at the request of his friend, he left the Empire to take care of his friend's son, Jing Tianming. His first appearance is in the pilot episode where kills 300 Qin Troops, dispatched to eliminate him and Tianming. He is injured in the process and is reluctantly helped by Duanmu Rong under pressure from Jing Tianming who sees him as a hero and mentor.

== Hundred Schools of Thought ==
=== Directionists ===
The Directionist School (Chinese: 纵横家; pinyin: zòng héng jiā) was a mysterious school, also called the Guigu (Ghost Valley) School. The school name means Longitudinal and Latitudinal, named after Longit Union and Latit Bonds which separately fought against and assisted Qin Kingdom. There are only two students in each generation, and one of them has to be defeated and die. The living one will control the rise and fall of all under heaven. "When they rise the kings are frightened; when they settle the world rests in peace."

- Ge Nie (Chinese: 盖聂; pinyin: gě niè): possesses the Longitudinal Sword and has mastered the highest skill in the Hundred-Step Flying Sword technique. He was selected to succeed the master as the head of the Directionist School.
- Wei Zhuang (Chinese: 卫庄; pinyin: wèi zhuāng): possesses the Latitudinal Sword. He was a rival to Ge Nie, and challenged him to succeed the master. He later became a mercenary and formed the Quicksand group.

=== Mohists ===
The Mohist School (Chinese: 墨家; pinyin: mò jiā) was developed by Mozi and this school holds upon the ideas of "No war" and "Equal love". The Mohists are masters of machinery skills and build Machinery City. The city is a paradise for the people and is protected by all kinds of machines and traps. Many of the Mohists are martial art masters.

- Yan Dan (Chinese: 燕丹; pinyin: yān dān): Aka "Crown Prince Dan (Chinese: 太子丹; pinyin: tài zǐ dān)". The leader of the Mohist school. A very solid, righteous and protective character. He knows his goals and would sacrifice himself for his loved ones. He possesses extremely powerful martial arts and has a sword named Momei. He was able to defeat Wei Zhuang. However, he was cursed by Dasiming of the Yin-Yang School, therefore resulting in his death. He is revealed to be Crown Prince Dan, who plotted the assassination for Ying Zheng with Jing Ke. He really believes in Tianming and realises that Tianming has what it takes to be a hero that will help thousands of people. He was the crown prince of the Yan Kingdom and he is the father of Gao Yue.
- Jing Ke (Chinese: 荆轲; pinyin: jīng kē): A Mohist leader. Tianming's father and a very powerful swordsman. He is very down to earth and humorous. He has exceptional speed and martial arts abilities. He fights as if he is just playing with them. He also has a big passion for wine and loves to drink and make friends that way. He will get extremely mad if anyone broke his wine jug or disturbed him while he was enjoying some wine. He is a great hero who can also be serious too. He and Yan Dan plotted to kill Ying Zheng, but failed. He is the good friend and big brother of Gao Jianli, and Ge Nie somehow also refers to him as his "only friend".
- Ban Dashi (means "Master Ban",Chinese: 班大师; pinyin: bān dà shī): A Mohist leader whose given name is Ban. (In the official webgame, his family name is Mo, so he is likely to be the seed of Mozi). He is one of the main protagonists in the early period of series possessing one machinery hand. His hardworking attitude often clashes with Tianming's easy-going and lazy attitude these situations between the two of them often turn into hilarious outbursts. His knowledge of machinery often pays out in the end, whether it was for entertainment purposes or rescuing people. Though he possesses no combat abilities, his knowledge of mechanics is astounding. He has the ability to build large wooden birds that are capable of flying. In addition, he is also a very good carpenter.
- Gao Jianli (Chinese: 高渐离; pinyin: gāo jiàn lí):A Mohist leader. A very calm and collected character. He used to be a famous music player and the soul friend of Kuang Xiu, the best music player who was killed by Qin. He wields the Freezing River (ranked 7 on the sword list), which can turn into ice once he enchants the Freezing River Yi ability. Back in his younger days when he did not contain such martial arts ability he was once saved by Jing Ke, Tianming's father. He is in love with Xuenv and truly cares for her. He is an exceptional martial artist but is much weaker in comparison to Ge Nie or Wei Zhuang.
- Xuenu (means "Snowgirl",Chinese: 雪女; pinyin: xuě nǚ): A Mohist leader who has silvery white hair. She's mysterious, nice and caring and calm during the midst of fights. She loves Gao Jianli. She has a very mischievous personality towards those close to her, such as being very playful towards Tianming. She is extremely elegant and beautiful, having once been a well-known dancer. She fights with silk ribbons and her music can causes snow to freeze her enemies. She seems to have a very sad past that caused her to swear to never marry anyone, but she meets her true love， Gao Jianli and wishes to spend her life with him.
- Duanmu Rong (Chinese: 端木蓉; pinyin: duān mù róng): A Mohist leader. One of the main protagonists in the early period of the series. She is a very intelligent and skilled doctor. She hails from the Kingdom of Yan and took Gao Yue under her care. Duanmu Rong always appears to be stoic and rarely smiling. She formerly refused to treat patients who did not satisfy her three rules to treatment. Her personality gradually evolves into a more soft-hearted person, and she treats Yue-er like a little sister. She falls for Ge Nie (who is revealed to also love her) and protects him from Baifeng's attack with her own body. She remains in a coma-like state during the third and fourth seasons. In season 4, the Mohist leaders received the Life-Saving Flower for Duanmu Rong. However, flower died during the battle of Xinghun and Ge Nie.
- Datiechui (means "Huge Iron Hammer",Chinese: 大铁锤; pinyin: dà tiě chuí): A Mohist leader. He was once a military officer who hailed from the Kingdom of Yan. He is very aware of what it means to be a man of the Yan Kingdom. He will never give up in fights and would do anything to protect his brothers. He can also be impatient, especially with Tianming.
- Dao Zhi (means "Thief Zhi",Chinese: 盗跖; pinyin: dào zhí): A Mohist leader and a thief named Zhi who can steal everything in the world. He has super light body skills (Qinggong) and can go anywhere he wishes. However, he seems to be a little slower than Baifeng due to his long-injured legs, which he still puts weights around. Not a lot of things would be safe if he took a fancy on them. He has a very laid back personality and loves to joke around, but he's truly in love with Duanmu Rong.
- Xu Fuzi (means "Mr.Xu",Chinese: 徐夫子; pinyin: xú fū zǐ): A Mohist leader, whose family name is Xu, from a famous sword-founding family and is a serious and solemn old man. His mother forged Jing Ke's sword Canhong (Broken Rainbow) that was later reforged into Ge Nie's sword Yuanhong (Deep Rainbow), and his father made Wei Zhuang's sword Shachi (Shark Teeth).
- Pao Ding (means "Chef Ding",Chinese: 庖丁; pinyin: páo dīng): A Mohist leader, whose family name is Ding. He acts as a spy in Shanghai (Shandong province in real life) and is a fat lovable man. He has powerful sabre kung fu. He is a great cook and owns a restaurant called Youjian Hotel (which literally translates to "There is a hotel").

=== Confucianists ===
The Confucianist School (Chinese: 儒家; pinyin: rú jiā) is one of the most respected schools and is the school of Master Confucius. The school has very orthodox beliefs, teaching the students to study for the country. However, the emperor sees this school as a big threat due to its great influence. They are based at the Junior Sage Village near Shanghai. In the latter half of Season 3, Tianming and Shaoyu study there as Confucianist disciples.

- Fu Nian (Chinese: 伏念; pinyin: fú niàn): The head of Confucianists. A calm, solemn, strict and orthodox man, not much has been shown about him except that he wields a sword named Tai-e (which is ranked third among the sword manual). He works hard to develop and protect the Confucianist disciples and therefore he is strongly against helping the Mohist School which fight against Qin.
- Yan Lu (Chinese: 颜路; pinyin: yán lù): He is the Second Household Manager of the Confucianists. He is a very gentle and calm man who never shows off his abilities. He is very respectful to his seniors and assists Zhang Liang a lot by dealing with his aftermath and covering his secrets. According to himself, "The Eldest Senior's words must never be forgotten, the Third Junior's words must never be remembered." At present he works with Zhang Liang by helping the Mohists.
- Zhang Liang (Chinese: 张良; pinyin: Zhāng Liáng): Courtesy name Zifang (Chinese: 子房; pinyin: Zǐfáng), the Third Manager of Confucianists, his father was the prime minister of Han(韩) Kingdom. A handsome young man who plans things extremely well, he is very intelligent and often knows the answers to many things. He predicts that Tianming will owe him seven favors(Tianming already owes him two). He comes from Confucianists but has done many things to help the Mohist School because he believes the country needs a new leader who cares about the people, but his confidence and fearlessness might sacrifice Confucianists (a disaster that indeed took place in real history). In fact, in real history, he is one of the greatest people who assisted in defeating Qin and foundation of the Han(汉) Dynasty. See Zhang Liang (Western Han).
- Xunzi(Chinese: 荀子; pinyin: xún zǐ): The uncle master of the three, an old man with strange temper. He is very good at Ching and medicine. He was the master of Han Fei and Li Si. The latter murdered the former due to jealousy and therefore Master Xun never admits to Li Si as his student. He is a chess master, but was defeated by Tianming (thanks to Zhang Liang's trick), and befriends Tianming. He claims that he knows no kung-fu, but it seems he's just trying Tianming. Historically, he died before the Qin dynasty.

=== Taoists ===
The Taoist School (Chinese: 道家; pinyin: dào jiā) of Lao-tzu is divided into two sections: the Heaven Clan(Chinese: 天宗; pinyin: tiān zōng) and the Human Clan(Chinese: 人宗; pinyin: rén zōng). The former focuses on self-cultivation and the nature, while the latter cares about the policies and situations, which causes conflicts between the two.

Heaven Clan

- Xiaomeng (means "Dawn-dream",Chinese: 晓梦; pinyin: xiǎo mèng): Her first appearance is in Season 5. The leader of the Heaven Clan. Before she entered the sect, she defeated the Six Elders of the Heaven Clan when she was only 8 years old. She then went into seclusion for 10 years. Now, at only 18 years old, she is the owner of Qiuli, the ninth sword in the swordplay manual and is considered as an Elder to the Confucian School with a strong internal skill ( Chinese 內功; pinying: Nei gong). She is the Junior Sister of the previous leader of the Heaven Clan, thus is respected accordingly.
- Xiao Ling (Chinese: 小灵; pinyin: xiǎo líng, only appears in Shaosiming's special edition): One of the students from the Heaven Clan. Little is known about him, but he entered Yin-Yang School's Water Division and did everything to find his lost sister, Xiao Yi(Chinese: 小衣; pinyin: xiǎo yī). Five years later, he met a nameless girl from the Wood Division. As a Senior Brother, he took care of her when she was bullied, even though she is still emotionless towards him. When the two of them set foot in the forbidden area of Yin-Yang School, his true identity was exposed by the Yin-Yang leaders, including Donghuang Taiyi, Yueshen, Xinghun, Yunzhong Jun and Dasiming. Yueshen ordered that girl to put him to death and it was also because Xiao Ling lied that she was first to enter the forbidden area. After he volunteered to be sentenced to death by that girl and telling her that he wished she saw a better side of him, it is unknown if he survived that girl's attack. And after carry out Yin-Yang leaders' order, that girl was promoted to the leader of Wood Division, Shaosiming.

Human Clan

- Xiaoyao Zi (means "Master Peripatetic",Chinese: 逍遥子; pinyin: xiāo yáo zǐ): The leader of the Human Clan. Not much is known about his martial arts skill but he does contain medical skills. When Mohists' Leader (Yan Dan) fell ill, Xiaoyao Zi was able deduce that a curse was the cause of his sudden pain. He is the owner of Xueji (Untranslatable, in Chinese this means after the snow, the sky turns sunny), the sixth sword in the swordplay manual.

=== Yin-Yang School ===
The Yin-Yang School (Chinese: 阴阳家; pinyin: yīn yáng jiā) in Chinese history focused on astrology, the mysteries of the five elements and the Eight Diagrams. Many within the Yin-Yang School are said to have studied divinity. Therefore, in this story, Yin-Yang School possess magical powers. Some of their names belong to the gods and goddesses in The Nine Odes by Qu Yuan, the first poet of ancient China.

- Donghuang Taiyi (means "the East Emperor, the First One", Chinese: 东皇太一; pinyin: dōng huáng tài yī): The highest leader of Yin-Yang School. He is named after the god of sun and the creator. With his whole body covered in black, little is known about him. He was the one who commanded Yueshen to capture Gao Yue. He was also the one who gave Gao Yue her supposed real name 'Jiru Qianlong'. He seems to have some nostalgic memories about the Treasure Box of Illusion Music.
- Yueshen (means "Moon Goddess", Chinese: 月神; pinyin: yuè shén): A rank of sir in Yin-Yang School. One of the two mages that protects the empire. Very powerful image. Her appearances throughout the series are quite rare but her skills are very powerful. It seems that she can control every five elements. She bears the same family name as Gao Yue (the name of the royal family before the country broke into seven), which is a confusing mystery. Her ambitions and goals are mysterious and unknown.
- Xinghun (means "Star Wraith", Chinese: 星魂; pinyin: xīng hún): He is of the same rank as Yueshen. One of the two mages that protects the empire. Wearing blue outfit. He is extremely powerful in the Yin-Yang School. With frightening tattoo on his face, his appearance is as a very young boy. He is arrogant and seems to hold little regard for those who are weaker than him. Little is known about his background yet.
- Yunzhong Jun (means "Lord in the Clouds", Chinese: 云中君; pinyin: yún zhōng jūn):The highest leader of Five Elements(五行 wŭ xíng) Division Leaders. He leads the Metal(金) Division. A mysterious character, ready to take the huge ship "Mirage" to the sea, searching for divinity. He personal name is Xu FuChinese: 徐福; pinyin: xú fú), a court sorcerer in Qin Dynasty.
- Dasiming (officially translated to "Priestess of Death", Chinese: 大司命; pinyin: dà sī mìng): One of Five Elements Division Leaders, who leads Fire(火) Division. A very mysterious character with little background known. She is wearing red outfits and her legs has black tattoo. She is also a very beautiful woman. With her outfit and skin her power is look like poison or fire. Actually her power is curse and she can transform herself to another. She use red ray to attack. She seems to be on the evil side and put a curse on the Leader of the Mohist School. It's expected that her past will be revealed. She is one of the top experts of Yin-Yang School, her hands are red because of practicing the curses. She seems to care for Xinghun very much. She gave the same curse to both Han Fei and Yan Dan. And now Tianming.
- Shaosiming (officially translated to "Priestess of Birth", Chinese: 少司命; pinyin: shào sī mìng): One of Five Elements Division Leaders. She leads the Wood(木) Division. A very mysterious character with little known background. Her face is covered yet she's said to be extremely beautiful. She has not spoken yet in the series. She is one of the top experts of Yin-Yang School. She uses leaves to attack. (leaf, wood, tree, vine are mother nature of earth)
- Xiang Jun (means "Lord Xiang", Chinese: 湘君; pinyin: xiāng jūn): One of Five Elements Division Leaders. He leads the Earth(土) Division. His background is little know. In Lady Xiang's special edition, his personal name is ShunChinese: 舜; pinyin: shùn), aka "Mr.Shun(Chinese: 舜君; pinyin: shùn jūn)", which is the name of Emperor Shun, a legendary emperor of Ancient China. He is the husband of the twin sisters. According to the special edition, the twin sisters jumped into the river in order to find out who was more loved by Lord Shun once they realized that love wasn't something that could be shared by two people. Unfortunately, Lord Shun only managed to save one of the sisters, and he doesn't know whether he saved Ehuang or Nuying. No matter which one is alive, Lord Shun was deeply in love with both of them and therefore losing one of the two sisters left him heartbroken. That feeling of guilt and heartbroken pain finally made him leave the Xiaoxiang valley.
- Xiang Furen (means "Lady Xiang", Chinese: 湘夫人; pinyin: xiāng fū rén): One of Five Elements Division Leaders, who leads the Water(水) Division. She is still mysterious. And the background is not clear. In Lady Xiang's special edition, it is said that they are extremely similar twin sisters, whose personal names are Ehuang(Chinese: 娥皇; pinyin: é huáng) and Nuying(Chinese: 女英; pinyin: nǚ yīng), which are the names of Emperor Yao's two daughters, who both became the wives of Emperor Shun. The two sisters lived in Xiaoxiang valley (a valley where people only can enter but can't return). Elder is Ehuang and younger is Nvying. According to their stories one of the twin was dead. But doesn't know which one is dead or which one is still alive. They both fall in love with the same man at the same time—Lord Shun. But when one of the twins died, he left the valley. She waits for her husband to come back to her.
- Yan Fei is the wife of Yan Dan. He calls her Fei Yan. She is Yue'er's mother and is being held captive on the Mirage Ship. As being from the Yin-yang School, she was known as Lord Dongjun (Lord of the East). Her powers surpasses Yueshen's, as said by Xinghun and Yunzhong Jun, who are aware how powerful she really is. But Xinghun believes Yue'er is her weakness.

=== Peasant School ===
The Peasant Family or School (Chinese: 农家; pinyin: nóng jiā), also known as Shennong Order (t 神農氏, s 神农氏, p Shénnóngshì) followers of Shennong or Agriculturists: In Chinese history, it's the school that studied agriculture. Here in the plot, the Shennong leader can only be appointed by the Xia Kui of the Peasant School. However, the last Xia Kui died mysteriously three years ago. The school is the one of masters hidden among normal people. Because the school has the most disciples, the school is divided into Six Halls: Shennong Hall, Lieshan Hall, Gongong Hall, Kuiwei Hall, Chiyou Hall, and Siyue Hall.

Shennnong Hall

- Zhu Jia (Chinese: 朱家; pinyin: zhū jiā) is the leader of the Shennong Hall, which is considered one of the strongest. Zhu Jia is a very short man and always wear masks, which switches back and forth based on his emotions. As Ge Nie has observed, "his mind changes constantly, wears a thousand of faces."
- Chen Sheng (陈胜), Shengqi, "The Black Swordsman" (Chinese: "黑剑士"胜七; pinyin: "hēi jiàn shì" shèng qī), with his sword Juque (Huge Wound) belongs to this school. Li Si believes he is able to defeat Ge Nie. Apparently, Shengqi has a younger brother being held by the Net Trap Organization. He is named after the historical revolutionary Chen Sheng.
- Dian Qing works under Zhu Jia. He's huge and very muscular and wears a blindfold. He was originally from the state of Wei. He and Mei Sanniang studied under the same master.
- Liu Bang (Liu Ji) (Chinese: 刘邦; pinyin: liú bāng) works for Zhu Jia. Quite handsome, with a mustache and generally wears red clothing exposing his chest. He is outspoken and lazy, loves gambling, but rarely wins. He is named after the first Han emperor Liu Bang.

Lieshan Hall

- Tian Meng is leader of the Lieshan Hall. Father of Tian Yan and Tian Ci. It is said his skills surpasses Shengqi. His mysterious death creates a conflict within the Peasant School.
- Tian Yan is the elder daughter of Tian Meng, niece of Tian Hu, and older sister of Tian Ci. She is very intelligent, and possibly the best tactician within the Lieshan Hall. She attempts to form an alliance between the Lieshan Hall, Chiyou Hall, Gonggong Hall and Kuiwei Hall.
- Tian Ci (Chinese: 田赐; pinyin: tián cì) is Tian Hu's nephew. Despite his young age, Tian Ci is said to be the most powerful swordsman among them. His swords are Gan Jiang and Mo Ye. He acts childish, but is fierce when it comes down to his family.
- Mei Sanniang cares for Tian Yan and Tian Ci. She was originally from the state of Wei, like Dian Qing.

Gonggong Hall

- Tian Zhong (Chinese: 田仲; pinyin: tián zhòng) is the leader of the Gonggong Hall and supports Lieshan Hall. He is very astute and level-headed, usually the one to calm Tian Hu down and offer advice. He was formerly adopted by Zhu Jia of the Shennong Hall but later joined the Lieshan Hall to further his ambitions.
- Jin (Old Jin) is a highly skilled swordsman older man who carries out the instructions of Tian Hu. Anyone who fights him usually becomes heavily injured, ending up near death, however he appears reluctant to kill his opponents. It is later revealed that his name is Wu Kuang and the brother of Shengqi.

Kuiwei Hall.

- Tian Mi (Chinese: 田蜜; pinyin: tián mì) is the leader of the Kuiwei Hall and supports Shennnong Hall. She always seen smoking from a long pipe and can use her pipe and smoke as weapons.

Chiyou Hall

- Tian Hu (Chinese: 田虎; pinyin: tián hǔ) is the second-in-command of the Lieshan Hall, the other strongest among the Halls. Hot-tempered, he wears an eyepatch. He strongly believes that Wei Zhuang, Ge Nie, and Zhu Jia plotted his brother's death.
- Gu Yao is a skilled assassin using twin curved blades and supports Shennnong Hall. He wears a pair of masks which can be changed at will and is highly skilled in martial arts. He can dislocate and relocate his bones which allow him to change his shape.

Siyue Hall

- Situ Wanli initially supports Shennnong Hall and fights with twin Deer Horn Knives. He often gambles with Liu Bang and wins without mercy. He later betrays Shennnong Hall and supports Tian Hu of Lieshan Hall.

Others

- Lady Hua Ying is member of the Peasant School and the owner of the Drunken Dream House in Jianghu which was set up with help from Zhu Jia, leader of the Shennong Hall.
- Ji Bu is a master thief, and brother of Lady Hua Ying. He uses the Tiger Hidden Among Flowers technique and was the leader of the Thunder Leopard army in the former Chu Empire.

=== Others ===
- Military theorists (Chinese: 兵家; pinyin: bīng jiā): The school of Master Sun. Studies on the arts of wars. Including Xiang Shaoyu, Xiang Liang (Chinese: 项梁; pinyin: xiàng liáng, Shaoyu's uncle), Fan Zeng (Chinese: 范增; pinyin: fàn zēng, Shaoyu's teacher, a very strict old man), and Han Xin(Chinese: 韩信; pinyin: hán xìn) who appears in Season 4, one of the greatest figures who found Han Dynasty. Long Ju(Long Qie) (Chinese: 龙且; pinyin: lóng jū), another historical figure of the Qin-Han transition period, is ascribed to the military school (Season 4, episode 16 ff.)
- Legalist School (Chinese: 法家; pinyin: fǎ jiā): The school of Master Han Fei(pinyin: hán fēi), the school that insisted on laws, developments and executions, and enabled Qin of unifying China. Li Si, who is from Confucianists, turns to Legalist and became the prime minister of Qin. And Li Si is jealous of his fellow disciple Han Fei and murdered him.
- Logician School (Chinese: 名家; pinyin: míng jiā): The school of Master Hui, good at logics and debates. The most famous is the Gongsun Family. The representative character is Gongsun Linglong, a fat woman (Chinese: 公孙玲珑; pinyin: gōng sūn líng lóngī) who kept calling herself an exceptional beauty. She is very eloquent, tries to humiliate Confucianists with her invincible theory "A white horse is not a horse", but defeated by Tianming (who got the idea from Zhang Liang's reminder).

== Other antagonists ==
=== Quicksand ===
The Quicksand (Chinese: 流沙; pinyin: liú shā) and Inverse Quicksand/Quicksand Rebels (Chinese: 逆流沙; pinyin: nì liú shā) is a group of mercenaries was formed by Wei Zhuang who were hired by the Qin Empire to capture Ne Gie and Jing Tianming.

- Wei Zhuang (Chinese: 卫庄; pinyin: wèi zhuāng): A former student of the Guigu ("Ghost Valley") School who studied alongside Ge Nie. They are rivals and his swordsmanship is just below that of Ge Nie who he unsuccessfully sought to defeat. The Qin Emperor's Advisor has hired him to hunt down Jing Tianming and his friends. During the battle with Ge Nie in the Machinery City, he breaks Ge Nie's sword with his sword Shachi (Shark Teeth). Both men were wounded badly after the duel.
- Baifeng (officially translated as "White Phoenix", Chinese: 白凤; pinyin: bái fèng): Aka "Baifenghuang (Chinese: 白凤凰; pinyin: bái fèng huáng)". Not silent, but not very spoken. He wears blue in left arm and simply white on the right arm. On his right hand there are white feathers which is joined with a silver ornament. He has blue eyes and purple hair (which sometimes changes to navy blue). He can float in the sky by stepping on a feather. He usually rides on an enormous white bird and has the ability to control all birds. His speed is formidable, and his kung fu is said to be almost as good as Wei Zhuang. By moving very fast he can create two (Couple Phoenixes) and even six (Six Illusions of Dancing Phoenix) images of himself. He is very arrogant, stubborn and rather childish. He hailed from the Han kingdom and served under the Han general Ji Wuye (Chinese: 姬无夜; pinyin: jī wú yè).
- Chilian (officially translated as "Crimson Lotus", Chinese: 赤练; pinyin: chì liàn): Aka "Chiliannv (Chinese: 赤练女; pinyin: chì liàn nǚ)". The right-hand woman to Wei Zhuang and once Princess Honglian (means "Red Lotus", Chinese: 红莲; pinyin: hóng lián) of the Han Kingdom. She was to marry to the Han general Ji Wuye, due to his request to the Han Emperor. She planned to assassinate Ji Wuye on their wedding but failed. Ji Wuye had nearly killed her but Wei Zhuang saved her. She almost never leaves Wei Zhuang's side, and is very much in love with him (it's said her name is a pun for "Selfless love"). She uses a snake sword (a present from Wei Zhuang). She can also freely control snakes and vipers. Her hypnosis skill "Fiery Enchantment" is what caused Gao Yue to have the mistaken belief that Ge Nie killed her father. She enjoys using any tricks in fighting and is willing to sacrifice herself to win (basically for Wei Zhuang's sake). When the former Han kingdom was destroyed Wei Zhuang promised her that one day he will give back a better Han Kingdom to her.
- Canglang (means "Dark Wolf King", Chinese: 苍狼; pinyin: cāng láng): Aka "Canglangwang (Chinese: 苍狼王; pinyin: cāng láng wáng)". He controls and lives with wolves, wears a mask and iron claws. He once attacked Tianming and his friends, but was defeated. After he recovered from the wounds, he was killed by Gao Jianli during the battle of Machinery City.
- Wushuang (means "Unparalleled", Chinese: 无双; pinyin: wú shuāng): Aka "Wushuanggui (Chinese: 无双鬼; pinyin: wú shuāng guǐ)". A huge powerful man, who doesn't talk. He works for Wei Zhuang, but in the past, he worked for someone else before joining Quicksand. He was once killed by Ge Nie, but Gongshu Chou revived him as a machinery man. He is later defeated by Iron Hammer and completely breaks down. He was even abandoned by Quicksand. But later he was repaired by Tianming, thus becoming good friends. In season 5, Wushuang seems to have joined Quicksand again.
- Yinfu (means "Hidden Bat", Chinese: 隐蝠; pinyin: yǐn fú): A member of Inverse Quicksand, a man who resembles a bat with pointy ears. For ten years, he lived in seclusion, practicing the Blood Bats Technique, which was a secret passed down for many years in South Xinjiang. Every time he kills a person, he drinks all of their blood so his martial arts will fractionally increase. If he doesn't drink blood in a day, he'll become older by a fraction. It was noted he has no friends by Wei Zhuang.
- Heiyu Qilin (translated as "Black Jade Unicorn",Chinese: 黑玉麒麟; pinyin: hēi yù qí lín): One of the Inverse Quicksand killers, who is also known as the Han Kingdom's number one assassin. His/Her gender is unknown in the animated TV series, but is a female (but lived in Spring and Autumn period) in the official webgame, and is a male in the drama. It is said that he/she does not have any shape or form, but can turn into any person or living being he/she wants. He/she is always in the shadow, working for Wei Zhuang. And every Quicksand member refers to him/her Lin-er (Chinese: 麟儿; pinyin: lín er). Little is known about his/her background yet.

=== Qin Empire ===
The Qin Empire (秦帝国) sought to unite and control all of China by defeating the other independent kingdoms. (Except for Gongshu Chou, the following characters in this section have prototypes in the history of Qin; Gongshu's name probably derives from that of Gongshu Ban who was a contemporary of Mozi.)

- Ying Zheng: The first emperor in Chinese history who destroys the other six kingdoms and unifies China. He has wild ambitions and wants everyone in the empire to abide by him. If not, they are seen as enemies and must be eliminated. He is considered a cruel emperor in Chinese history, but he also contributed to the country by unifying the characters, languages and units.
- Fusu: Ying Zheng's eldest son. A very fair-minded and noble young man. Tianming and Master Xun once save his life, and he is determined to find them. In Chinese history, perhaps Qin wouldn't have been defeated so quickly if he became the new emperor. He is later murdered by Zhao Gao, Huhai and Li Si.
- Huhai: Ying Zheng's 18th son, who was also his favorite. He appears to be childish and innocent, however, he wants to murder his own brother, Fusu. Having close ties with Zhao Gao, they failed the first attempt of taking Fusu's life. Historically, he became the second emperor of China's Qin dynasty.
- Li Si: From the Legalist School. A servant under Ying Zheng. He is also a very powerful minister and Ying Zheng communicates with him thoroughly. His opinions or ideas in a situation influences Ying Zheng's actions. He was once a Confucianist disciple, but now he tries to destroy them for Ying Zheng's sake.
- Zhao Gao: A powerful eunuch and the leader of the Net Trap Organization, also translated as "Snares"(Chinese: 罗网; pinyin: luó wǎng)". He controls numberless killers who have black spider tattoos. His best six assassins are called the "Six Sword Slaves", named after their swords: Zhengang (True Firm), Duanshui (Cutting water), Luanshen (Chaotic spirit), twin sisters Zhuanpo (Twisting souls) and Miehun (Destroying souls), Wangliang (an evil demon). Will appear in Season 4. In Chinese history, he murdered Fusu.
- Meng Tian: An excellent general, the leader of the Golden Fire Cavalry, who fights wholeheartedly for Ying Zheng. He was formerly General of the Soaring Dragon Army and fought with General Ying Bu, leader of the Shadow Tiger Army in the Chu Empire following Lord Chanping and the King. In Chinese history, his family was destroyed by Li Si and Zhao Gao.
- Zhang Han: An excellent general, the leader of the Shadow Division "Yingmiwei(Chinese: 影密卫; pinyin: yǐng mì wèi)". He takes direct orders from the Qin Emperor himself and has never come back empty–handed. Due to his stubbornness of never letting go of his enemies, his nickname is Bum Bettle, which Dao Zhi calls him by. In Chinese history, Zhang Han finally surrendered to Xiang Yu.
- Gongshu Chou (Chinese: 公输仇; pinyin: gōng shū chóu): A very scheming old man, from the Gongshu Family who is as skillful in machinery arts as Mohist school, works for Qin by building fighting machines. The Gongshu ancestor (Lu Ban) once lost to the creator of Mohists (Mozi), therefore Gongshu Chou is determined to destroy Mohists. His given name "Chou(仇)" means"revenge"in Chinese, which shows his strong determination. With his help, Qin's armies finally destroyed the Machinery City.
