= The Legend of Qin (TV series) =

Chinese animated television series

- 秦时明月
- Based on: Qin Shi Ming Yue by Sayling Wen
- Screenplay by: Robin Shen
- Directed by: Chen Qianyuan
- Voices of: Feng Junhua; Shen Dawei; Shen Lei; Huang Yiqing; Sun Ye; Zhai Wei; Hong Haitian
- Opening theme: "Moonlight" (月光) by Anson Hu
- Ending theme: "Feeling Moves" by Crystal Butterfly
- Country of origin: China
- Original language: Mandarin
- No. of seasons: 6
- No. of episodes: 179

Production
- Executive producers: Robin Shen; Wei Benna; Gong Lei
- Producers: Wen Shiyi; Robin Shen
- Production company: Sparkly Key

Original release
- Release: 2006 – present

The Legend of Qin (秦时明月), also known as Qin's Moon, is a Chinese CG animated wuxia television series produced by Robin Shen (沈乐平), and directed by Chen Qianyuan (陈乾元). The story is based on the novel of the same title by Taiwanese writer Sayling Wen (溫世仁). It is China's first 3D animated series, produced by Sparkly Key Animation Studio (Sparkly Key) in Hangzhou, Zhejiang. The series was first broadcast around the Lunar New Year in 2007.

The tile means "bright moon of the Qin era", quoted from poems by the Tang dynasty poet Wang Changling. The names of two main characters – Tianming and Yue'er – correspond to the ming (bright) and yue (moon) in the Chinese title. The story spans a 30-year period (including memories) from the founding of the Qin dynasty in 221 BC to its fall in 206 BC. It features a young man named Tianming, who becomes a hero and changes the course of history with his exploits.

== Synopsis ==
The Legend of Qin follows the history of the Qin dynasty from the conquests that unified China in 221 BC to the fall of the Qin capital Xianyang in 206 BC.

The story revolves around a young protagonist, Jing Tianming who carries the blood of a hero, maturing from a weak and ignorant young boy into a great hero who singlehandedly changes the course of history. It chronicles his meeting with his protector, the master swordsman Ge Nie, who has betrayed the Qin Empire in order to protect Tianming. They join with the Mohists in the Machinery City who, after being attacked by the Qin forces, seek the protection and assistance of the Confucianists in Shanghai. The Emperor enlists the aid of the army under General Meng and other groups such as Quicksand, the Yin-Yang School and the Net Trap Organization to defeat the rebel forces. During this period, the Emperor is also constructing a great wall for defence of the empire, and builds a floating city to travel to three Immortal Mountains outside the East Sea of Shanghai city to obtain an elixir of immortality.

The story unfolds on an epic scale, weaving history, fantasy and mythology with martial arts, swordsmanship, mechanical devices and magic. It traces an era of change, where, amidst the chaos and in the face of violence, dangerous enemies, difficult family relationships, friendship, love, sorrows and joys, eventually lead to the end of one era and the start of a new era in this romantic legend.

== Characters ==
- Jing Tianming: He is a bright and cheerful 12-year-old boy. He is playful although mischievous and is protective of his friends. He has a crush on Gao Yue (Yue-er), a girl under the care of Mohists, though he thinks that her big sister, Duanmu Rong, is a cold person. He sees Ge Nie as a father figure, and aspires to become a swordsman just like him. He also has a rivalry with Xiang Shaoyu, and a playful relationship with Master Ban. He has a passionate love of food (mainly roasted mountain pheasants) and goes berserk if someone eats his food or destroys it. Although quite shallow in certain aspects, his loyalty, bravery and innocence stand out as some of his more positive traits. Two driving aspects of his character are to become one of the most famous swordsmen in the world and the belief that his father will return to him one day.
- Gao Yue: Also known as Yue-er, she is a princess of the former Yan Kingdom and Yan Dan's daughter. She is quite cheerful, playful and generous, as well as kind and innocent. She generally gets along with everyone. She and Tianming are good friends, and she treats Duanmu Rong as her older sister, referring her as "Sister Rong". She is bright and intelligent and can analyse things very accurately. She solved mysteries in the Forbidden Land when nobody else knew the answers. She possesses great talent in Yin-Yang techniques and is taken into the Yin-Yang School by Moon Goddess. She is told that her real name is Ji Ru (Chinese: 姬如; pinyin: jī rú) and her courtesy name is Qian Long (Chinese: 千泷; pinyin: qiān lóng), bearing the same family name as Moon Goddess.
- Xiang Shaoyu: Shaoyu is from the royal tribe of the former Chu Kingdom. His character is based on the historical figure Xiang Yu, who defeated the Qin dynasty with his army. He is very proud of his tribe, is extremely strong and has excellent kung fu skills. He has a friendly, cheerful and warm personality and quite knowledgeable. He is a logical thinker, good at analysing situations and events. He and Tianming have a friendly rivalry and behave more like siblings and insisted on Tianming calling him Big Brother.
- Shi Lan: Her real name is Xiao Yu and she is from the Shu tribe. She is a quiet and mysterious character initially working in Chief Ding's restaurant, but is extremely skilled in martial arts, lightness skills and the magic arts. She saved Tianming and Shaoyu who in later episodes seems to have fallen in love with her. It is possible her character is inspired by the historical figure Yu Ji, Xiang Yu's most loved consort.
- Ge Nie: A very important character in the story, he is the most powerful warrior in the Qin dynasty. Because of his skills, he became the primary guard of the king of Qin dynasty, however he betrayed the king and left the capital city Xianyang. His purpose was to save the young Jing Tianming from the king and protect him from the king' agents until they joined The Mohist (Mo Jia) group. During their period together, Ge Nie taught Jing Tianming, helping him to mature.
- Wei Zhuang: Wei Zhuang is the second strongest warrior in the Qin dynasty. He is different from Ge Nie, in that he is not interested in following anyone's orders. He created the Quicksand (Liu Sha) organization, a group of warriors some see as mercenary killers available for hire to the highest bidder. Wei Zhuang and Ge Nie had the same teacher at the Ghost Valley School who taught them to how to fight and think. Their teacher was the most incredible person within the Qin dynasty and no one fully understood what his ability is or who he really was. Because Wei Zhuang had evil within his spirit, the master chose Ge Nie to succeed him, angering Wei Zhuang who fought Ge Nie to prove he was the best. The Qin Shi Huang, king of the Qin dynasty, hired Wei Zhuang to capture Jing Tianming.

== Media ==
=== Episodes ===
- Season 1: The first season of The Legend of Qin, explaining about Emperor Qin's wild ambitions to bring all six nations into one. This story began from Ge Nie rebelling from the Qin Empire and finding an orphaned boy named Tianming. Ge Nie was severely injured and luckily met Shaoyu from the Kingdom of Chu. At the same time, Emperor Qin had teamed up with the Han Kingdom's assassin group, known as Quicksand - consisting of Wei Zhuang as the leader to destroy the Machinery City. This was also when the disciples of Mohists first appeared - one of the philosophers that focuses on anti-war and universal love, started by Mozi. Duanmu Rong was a divine physician and Gao Yue was her assistant. Gao Yue (Yue-er) is discovered to be the princess of the Yan Kingdom, and that Wei Zhuang had killed her father. Together, they brave adventures and fight against Ying Zheng (Emperor Qin) for each other and the world. Eventually, they also met Da Tiechui and Xuenu, with Gao Jianli yet to arrive - also being Mohist disciples.
- Season 2: The second season was when Emperor Qin had sent Quicksand to destroy the Machinery City, the lair of Mohists. Wei Zhuang, the leader of Quicksand sent his subordinates to poison the water in the Machinery City, causing everyone to lose their defence. He then seized the Machinery City. At the same time, Duanmu Rong had sent the three kids, Tianming, Shaoyu and Gao Yue into the forbidden grounds of Mohists, a place where nobody could enter without permission. Getting past all the phases in the forbidden grounds required more than alertness, and strength, but also the ability to reason and think within a very short amount of time. Together, they pass through phases of tests, growing stronger together and fighting against Quicksand and Gongshu Chou, an anti-Mohist who is on Quicksand's team and built his mechanisms especially to deal with Mohists. In the end, it was one on one battle between Ge Nie with Wei Zhuang, Yue-er being taken by the Moon Goddess and Tianming suddenly appearing from Ge Nie's back and stabbing him.
- Season 3: Season three ended where Ge Nie and Wei Zhuang were about to fight, but Ge Nie seemingly was attacked by Tianming in the back. It was really not Tianming who did that, but Black Unicorn. Ge Nie and Wei Zhuang came from the same sect, called Ghost Valley. This sect only takes in two disciples and the two must fight until one wins and the other loses. Unfortunately, Ge Nie is knocked unconscious and Tianming being threatened to be killed if the remaining Mohists disciples did not fight Wei Zhuang's team. The battle arc showed a bit of Ge Nie and Tianming's past, as well as Gao Jianli, Xuenu and Da Tiechui's pasts, with flashbacks showing the meaning of true strength, dying for a brother, one of the most beautiful dances and a crazy hyper Tianming's father, Jing Ke who simply loved one. All these pasts showed the unique backgrounds of the characters and where they draw their strengths. The next arc revolved around the Confucianists helping out Mohists (even though usually those two never have any associations with each other) but they have decided to put aside their differences. Also, Yin-Yang theorists looks as if they are up to something. Yue-er was given a new name and told she was Jiru Qianlong and looks like a major event is going to happen with Mirage, a city on the ocean.
- Season 4: The fourth season takes place after the Mechanical City has collapsed and the Mohists are almost eliminated. The Qin Empire plans for a period of peace and prosperity and the Emperor utilizes a huge amount of labor to build the Great Wall and plans more sophisticated programs. There is apprehension in the city about the function of the giant boat "Mirage" which appears off the coast. Various rebel factions came together in Shanghai to defeat the Emperor's ambition. The Emperor and his forces, including the Quicksand group, the Yin-Yang School, Net Trap Organization and swordsman Shengqi are all arraigned against the rebel group comprising the Mohists, Confucianists and the Taoists. Tianming's education and training continue as he is faced with more and more challenges as leader of the Mohists.
- Season 5: Season Five continues the struggle of the Mohists and their allies against the Qin Empire in Shanghai and Crown Prince Fusu has a prominent role. A new character from the Taoist school (Heaven clan) Leader Xiaomeng (means "Dawn-dream", Chinese: 晓梦; pinyin: xiǎo mèng) appears on the side of the Qin. The Peasant School takes on a major role as leaders of the six Halls struggle for supremacy and to be the Xia Kui successor. The young and powerful General Zhang Han and the Shadow Division also make an entrance. Wei Zhuang and the Quicksand Group form and uneasy alliance with the Mohists and try to enlist the aid of the warring Peasant School. Tianming, Shaoyu and Shi Lan continue their search for Yue-er on the ship, Mirage.
- Season 6, Part 1: Season 6 continues with the Peasant School selecting the Xia Kui to lead the Six Halls while Jing Ni's identity, a Heaven-leveled assassin from Net Trap that sneaked into the Peasant School, is revealed. The Six Halls now faces another crisis against the Qin Empire: Wang Li and his army. Han Xin offers his help after showing his ability and the Xia Kui appoints him to take the lead to push back Wang Li. Han Xin begun to lead 100,000 disciples of the Peasant School and even commands Shaoyu's generals of Chu, with the exception of Zhongli Mei, in a great battle never seen before. Once the Peasant School finally overcame this crisis, the Xia Kui surprisingly arranges a dangerous job for Shengqi and Wu Kuang: To find and rescue the previous Xia Kui, who is held captive in Net Trap.

=== Specials ===
For full summaries of the Specials, see List of Qin's Moon episodes.

- Birdsong in Hollow Valley: This special consists of three episodes which tells the story of Baifeng and his friend Moya who were assassins for General Ji Wuye, but who turned against him after Baifeng falls for a female assassin, Nong Yu. She was engaged to kill the general by Wei Zhuang, but fails and dies from poison. This takes place before Baifeng joined the Quicksand group and explains his animosity towards Wei Zhuang.
- Under Luosheng Tang: This is a one episode special that tells the story of a young Taoist who joins the Yin-Yang School to find his sister. Five years later he meets a silent young girl who tries to enter a forbidden area. When the two of them set foot in the forbidden area they are caught and the girl, Xiao Ling, is ordered to kill him. He accepts the sentence and falls into the unknown and it is not known if he survived. Xiao Ling is then named Shaosiming and is promoted to the leader of Wood Division.
- Lady Xiang Descends: This special is about a wounded man who finds himself caught up in the lives of twin sisters, and the man that they both fell in love with.

=== Other series ===
Nine Songs of the Moving Heavens (Chinese: 天行九歌; pinyin: tiān xíng jiǔ gē), is a CG Chinese animated TV series that was released on March 10, 2016, and is the prequel to The Legend of Qin. It takes place before the time of the Qin dynasty and although the two animations have intersections of characters and timelines, Nine Songs of the Moving Heavens is an independent story.

== Settings ==
=== The Machinery City ===
The headquarters of Mohists. A city built among the mountains and cliffs, guarded with machines and traps. Mohists live here together and call this city "The Paradise In Human World". Tianming, Ge Nie arrive at the City in Season 1, Wei Zhuang and Qin's armies capture the City in Season 2, and in Season 3 after Wei Zhuang's retreat, Yan Dan orders the self-destruction of the city to hide the "last secret" which is still unknown now.

- The Waterfall and the Pool: The Drawbridge Waterfall and the Central Pool. The Waterfall which provides power for the city, beneath the waterfall is one of the four machinery creatures, Xuanwu (black tortoise), which controls power. The Pool spreads water to the whole city. In Season 2, the Pool water is poisoned, thus the whole city is paralysed.
- The Core and the Rotunda: The Mohists Core chamber and the Central Rotunda. The Core is where people can control every machine in the city, the only safe place when the city is captured. There are numberless traps in the Rotunda, and all the significant battles between Mohists and Wei Zhuang take place in the Rotunda.
- The Forbidden Land: The place with extraordinary machines and traps, no one is allowed to enter without permission. In fact is used to select new Mohists' head, those who enter the land must pass all kinds of trials to survive. The Overlord's Spear, Illusional Music Box, No War Sword, and the fourth machinery creature Qinglong (Green Dragon) are kept here.
- Others: The Heaven Corridors, corridors built aside high cliffs. The Sword-founding Pool, Master Xu's place, with many treasure swords, the place where Canhong was made.

=== Shanghai ===
This is the east border of Qin, the coast of the sea. In real history, the emperor sent people to sail to the ocean, seeking for the way of living forever. After the destruction of the Machinery City, Mohists come to Shanghai to work their next plan.

- Youjian Hotel (There is a Hotel): A secret Mohist headquarters, where Mohists watch the Qin's armies' actions. Paoding works here as the chief, and Shi Lan is now his assistant. There is also a secret headquarters in the mountains, guarded by Mohists disguised as normal people.
- Junior Sage Village (basically the junior shows modesty): The headquarters of Confucianists, the holy ground of knowledge in people's eyes. Twenty years ago, there was a fire disaster that destroyed almost the whole villa. According to the scenes in the OP, it's very likely that the villa will be burnt again like what will happen in real history. There are several places mentioned here, the Half Bamboo Garden where Xun Tze lives, the Six-Skill Chamber where the students take classes, the Self-Reflection Apartment where the students live, the Library Tower keeping a huge collection of books.
- The Mirage: A huge ship with numberless buildings on it. The name means Shen (a kind of sea dragon) Palace, which is Mirage. In Chinese, mirage is called Haishi Shenlou (Palaces created by Shen, Cities floating on the sea). At the end of Season 3, a mirage once appears at Shanghai, it seems it is in fact Mount Shu, Shi Lan's hometown. Shenlou will take the Yin-Yang theorists to the sea searching for immortality. Many mysterious treasures are taken with them. This ship was also a significant setting in Season 4.

=== Other locations ===
- The Medicine Villa of Mirror Lake: Once a Mohist place where Duanmu Rong lives. No one can find it if there are no inside guides. There is a rule in the villa, that Duanmu Rong never treats those whose family name is Ge, those who come from Qin Kingdom, and those who get wounded in sword fights caused by their own violence and aggression.
- Xianyang Palace: The Palace where emperor Ying Zheng lives. It seems Tianming has been there before and seen the No.1 sword Tianwen.
- The Sparrow Pavilion: A beautiful place where everything was; however, it was also a prison to many. The recent owner of the place was Nong Yu, who's actually an assassin on a mission to kill Ji Wuye, the General of the Han Kingdom.

== Production ==
The Legend of Qin characters, settings, and special effects are all created through the use of 3D CG technology.

Motion capture technology was used to capture the fast-paced action scenes. The performers, played by widely known international film stars and veterans, were used to give the CG-animated fight scenes a live-action feel.

== Airing ==
Five seasons, three special editions and the movie were released. The sixth season is currently airing. There is a total of 7 seasons planned.

The show had been aired in 37 countries and still is airing in China, Vietnam, Cambodia, Myanmar, and Thailand.
