= Wei Wuzu =

Elite infantry unit of Wei during the Warring States Period

The Wei Wuzu (魏武卒) were an elite heavy infantry unit from the State of Wei established by the famous general Wu Qi during the Warring States Period(475 BC-221 BC) of China. At that time, the Wei State and Qin State were constantly fighting for the Hexi region, the gateway to Guanzhong. After Wu Qi became the general of Wei State, he established this elite armored unit to improve the quality of the army.

== Overview ==
The Wei Wuzu had to undergo extremely rigorous training. According to the Book of Xunzi on Military Affairs, they could march 100 li (41.6 km, based on the Eastern Zhou li) in one day while equipped with heavy lamellar armour, a helmet, a Polearm strapped to their back, a sword(Jiàn) strapped to their waist, as well as wield a crossbow(Nǔ) with 50 bolts in their quiver, and three days of rations. Soldiers who met these standards earned an exemption from corvée labor and taxes for their entire family.

With this elite infantry unit, Wu Qi was able to conquer the Hexi region, winning many battles. One decisive battle that Wu Qi fought, was when the Qin State dispatched 500,000 men to retake back the Hexi region. Wu Qi then sent the 50,000 professionally trained Wei Wuzu to defend Hexi, which ended in a devastating loss for the Qin, despite the Wei Wuzu being heavily outnumbered almost 1 to 10. It was because of this that Wu Qi was able to fully annex the Hexi region, and the Qin was unable to reconquer it for decades to come.

== See also ==
- Military of the Warring States
