= Chinese polearm =

Polearm traditionally used by Chinese armies

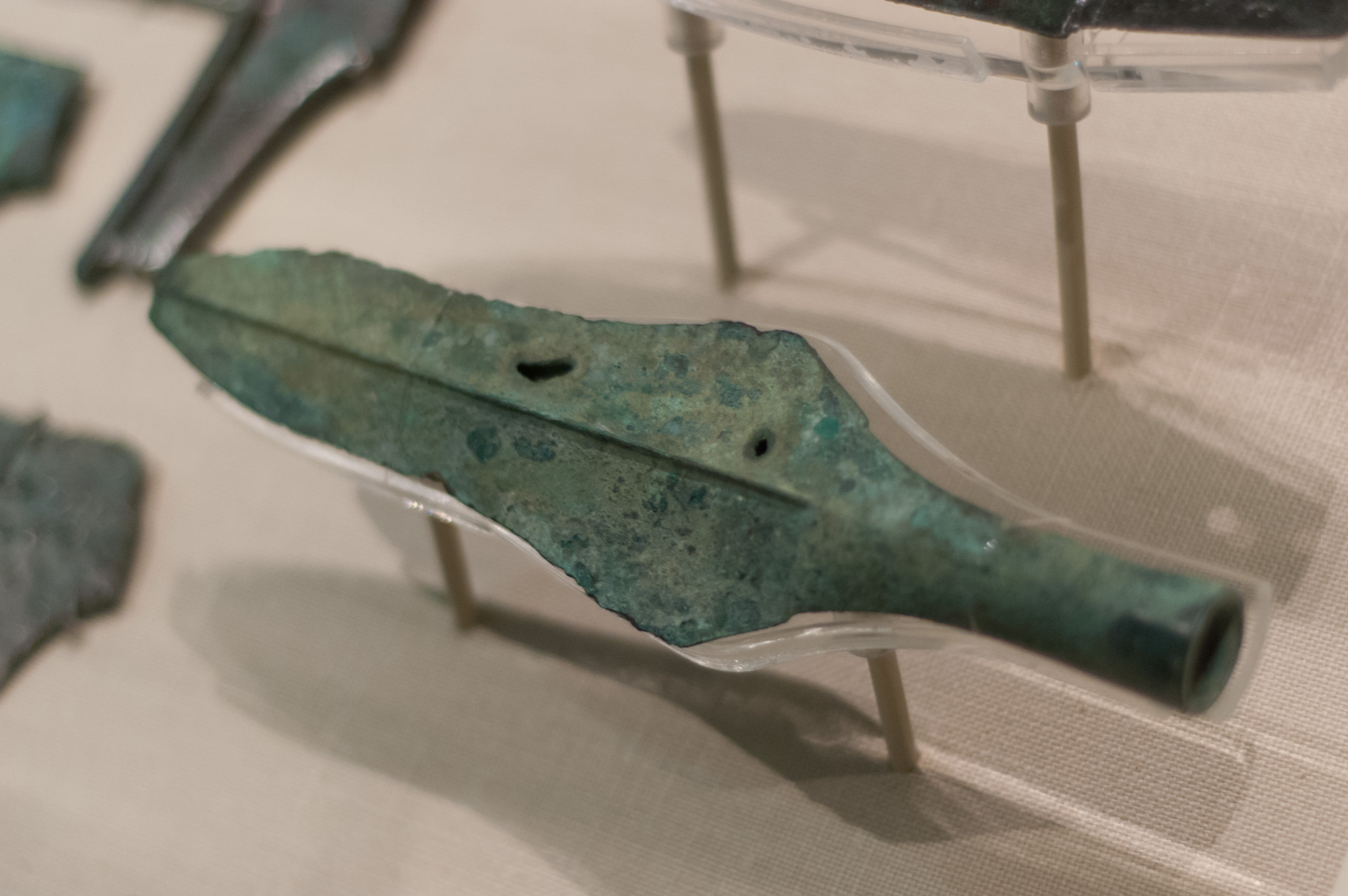
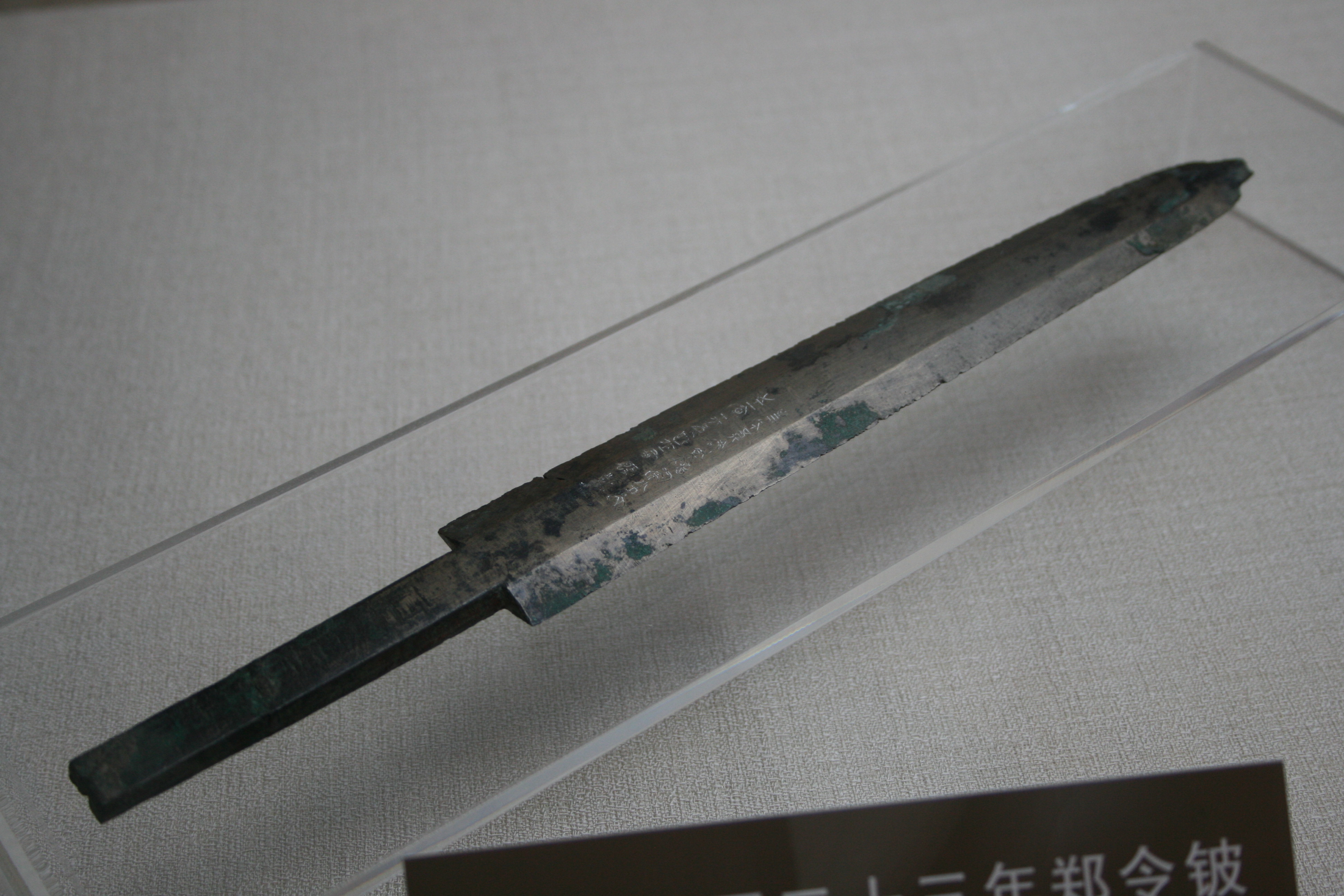
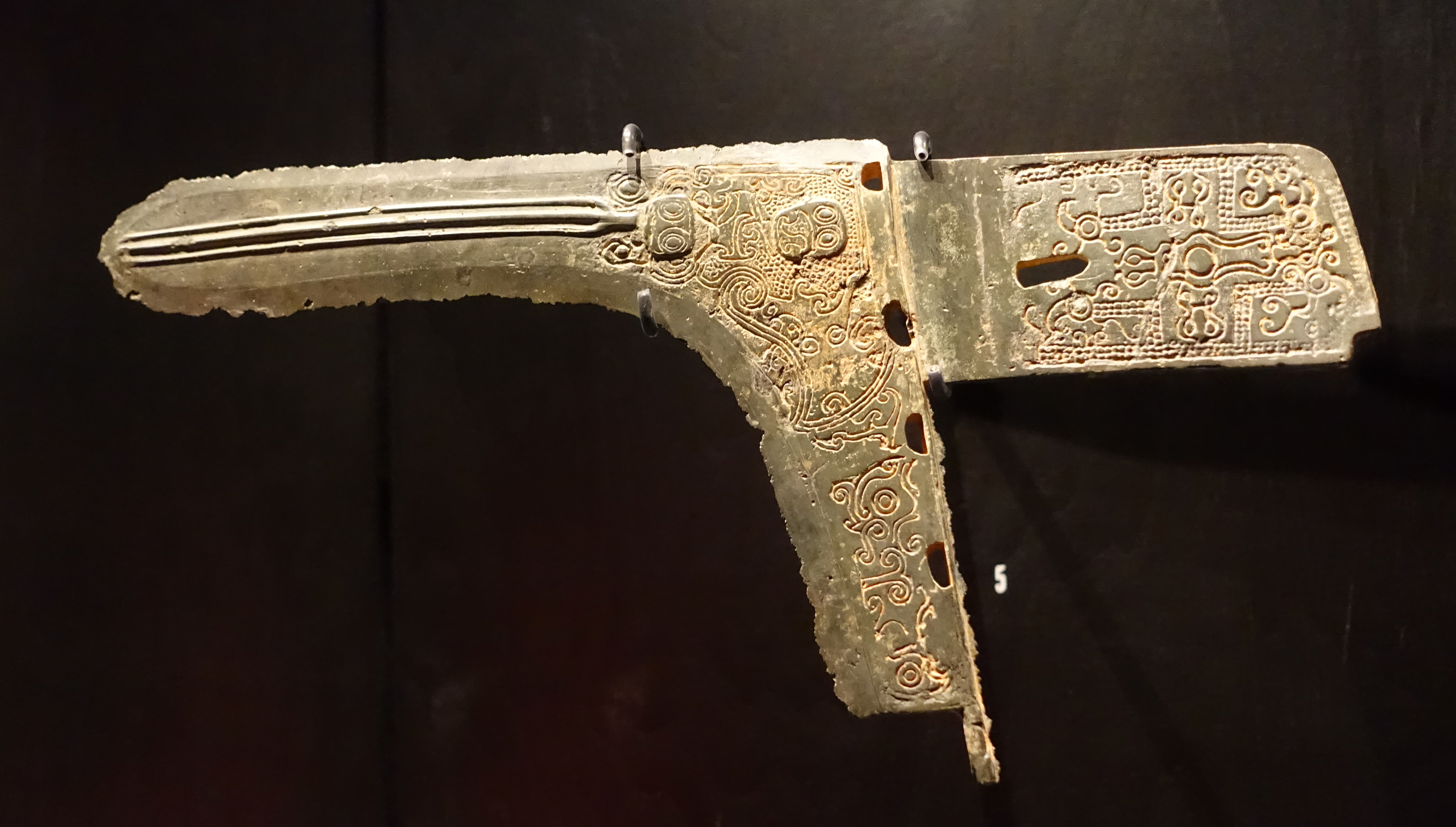
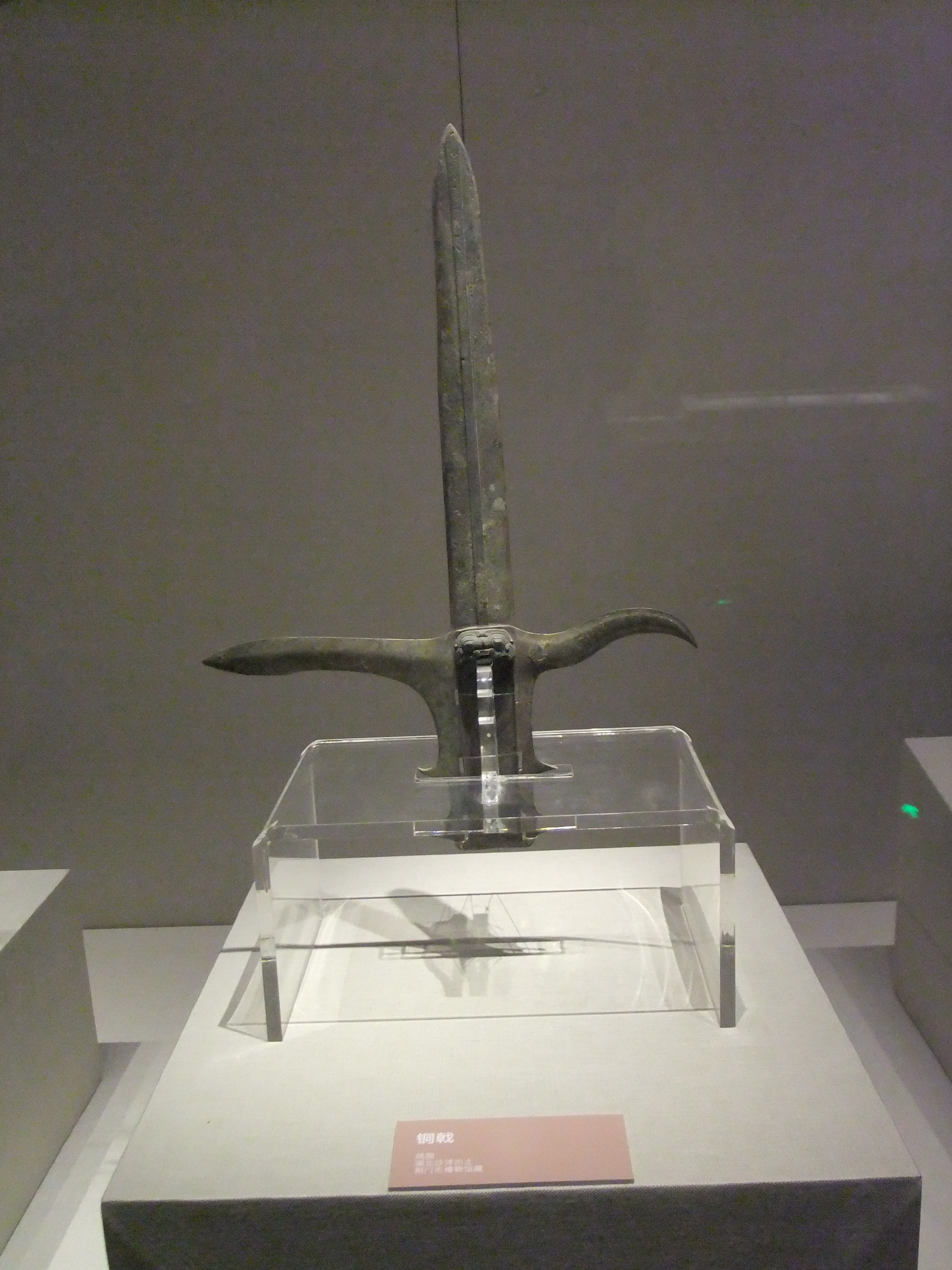
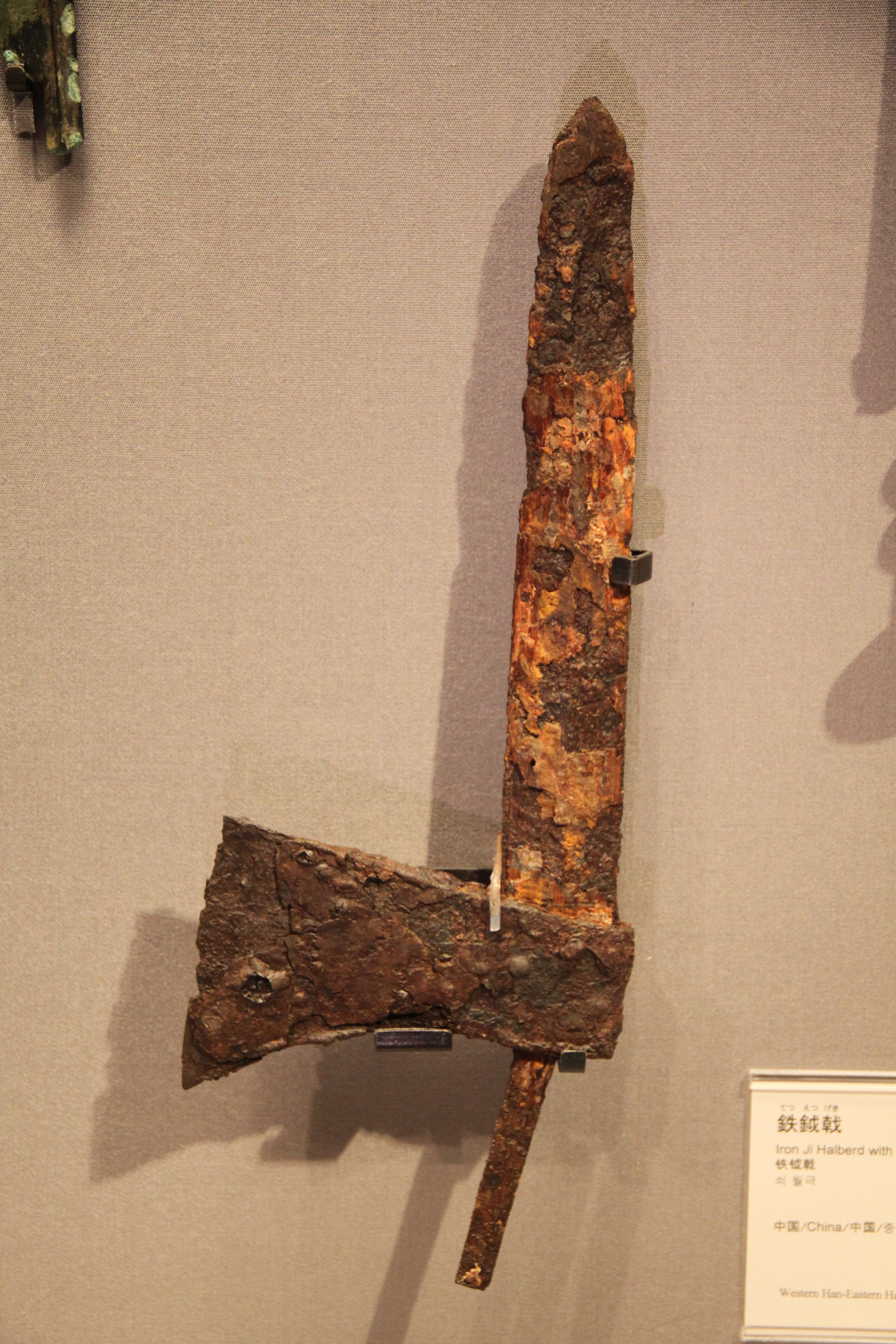
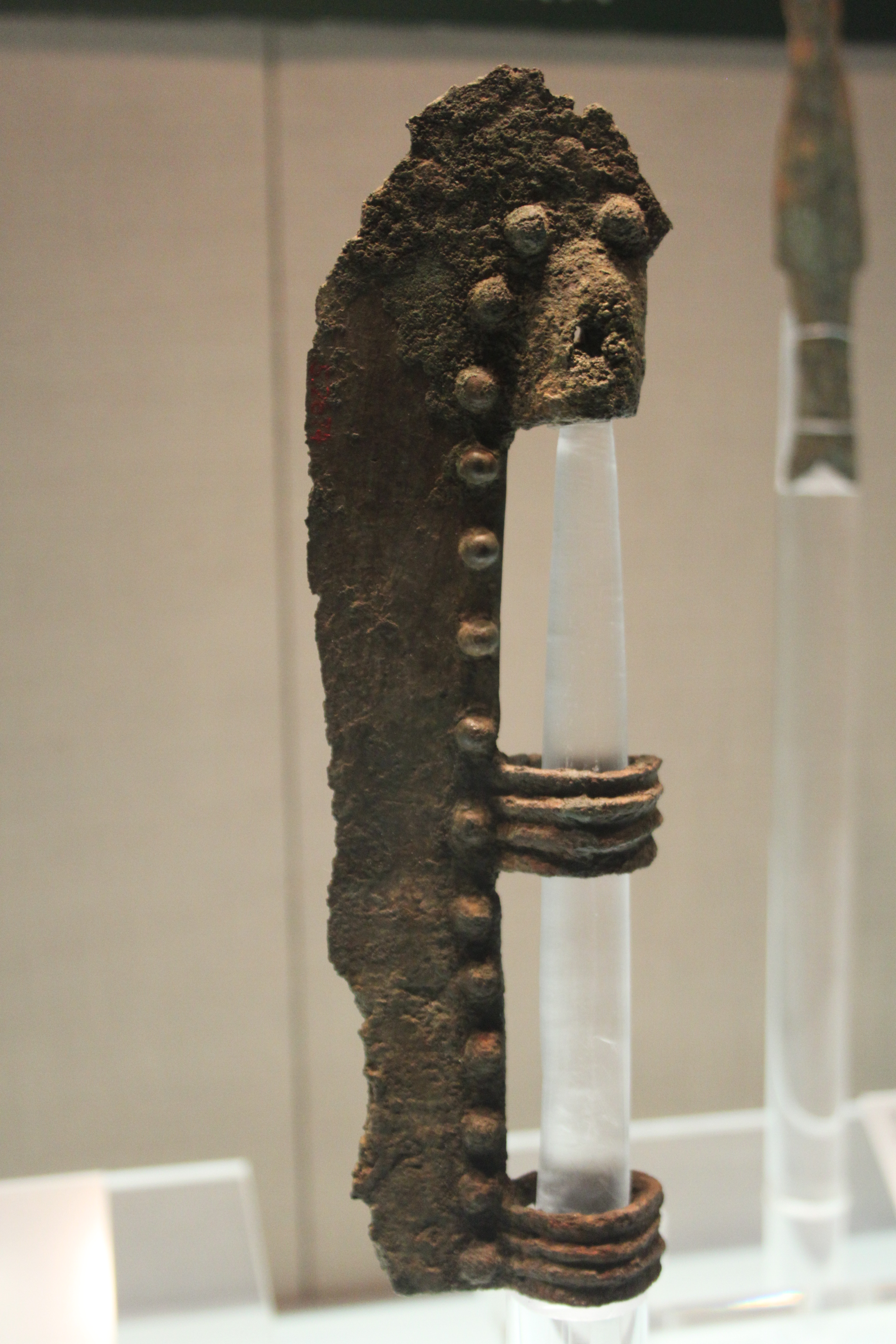
Left to right: Spear (qiang), sword staff/long lance (pi), dagger-axe (ge), halberd (ji), axe-halberd (yueji), and great dao (dadao)

The three most common types of Chinese polearms are the ge (戈), qiang (槍), and ji (戟). They are translated into English as dagger-axe, spear, and halberd. Dagger-axes were originally a short slashing weapon with a 0.9–1.8 m (2 ft 11 in – 5 ft 11 in) long shaft, but around the 4th century BC a spearhead was added to the blade, and it became a halberd. The spear is also sometimes called a mao (矛), which is sometimes used to designate polearms with a wavy snake-like spearhead. There was another polearm weapon known as the pi (鈹), translated into English as either sword-staff or long lance, that was used from ancient times until the Han dynasty. It was essentially a short sword attached to a stick. From the Warring States period onward, the length of Chinese polearms varied from around 2.8 to 5.5 m (9 ft 2 in to 18 ft 1 in); however, there is no specific designation for a pike in the traditional Chinese lexicon. A very long spear is just called a long spear.

== Shang dynasty (c. 1600 BC – c. 1046 BC) ==
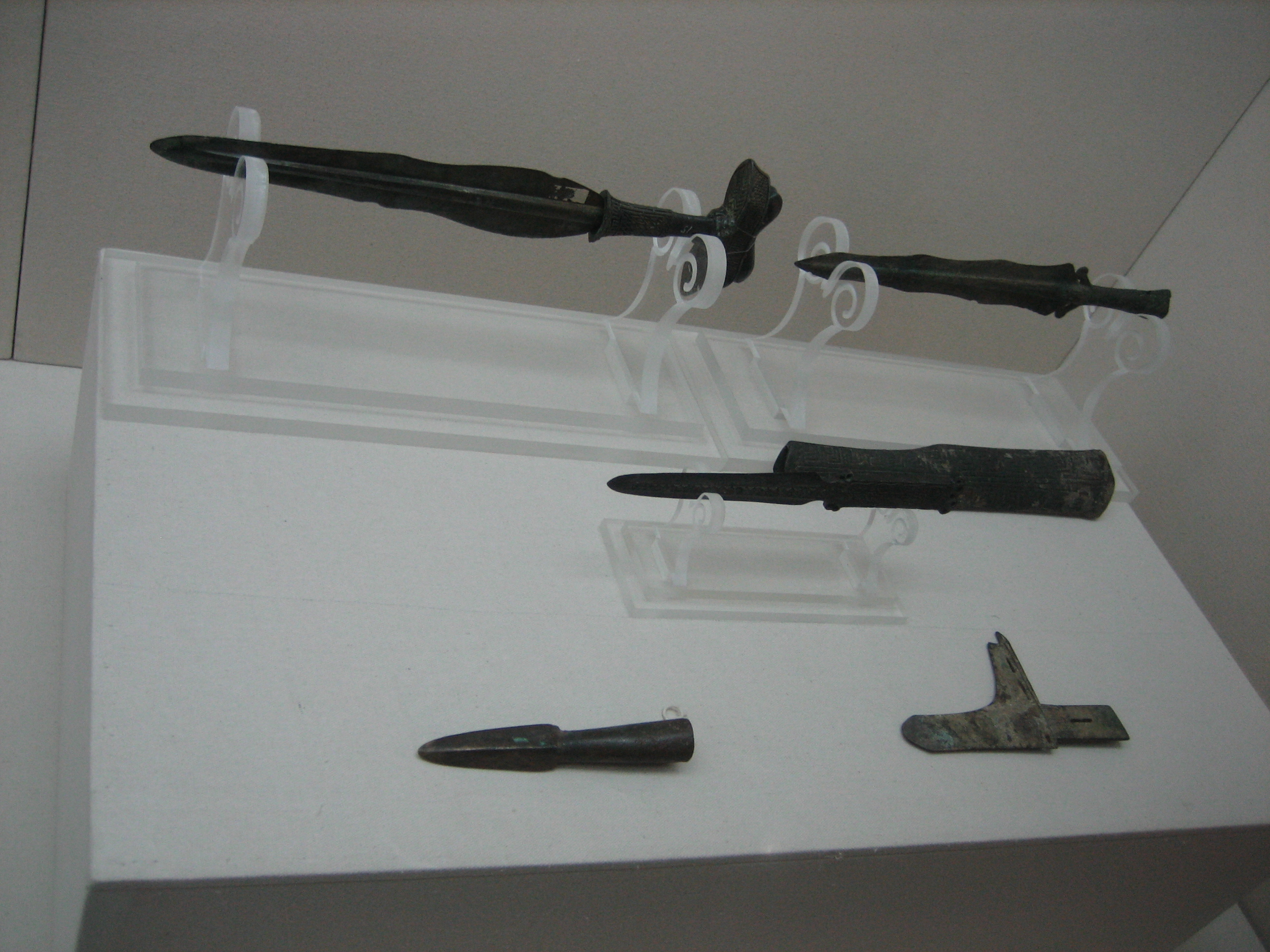
Spring and Autumn period polearms

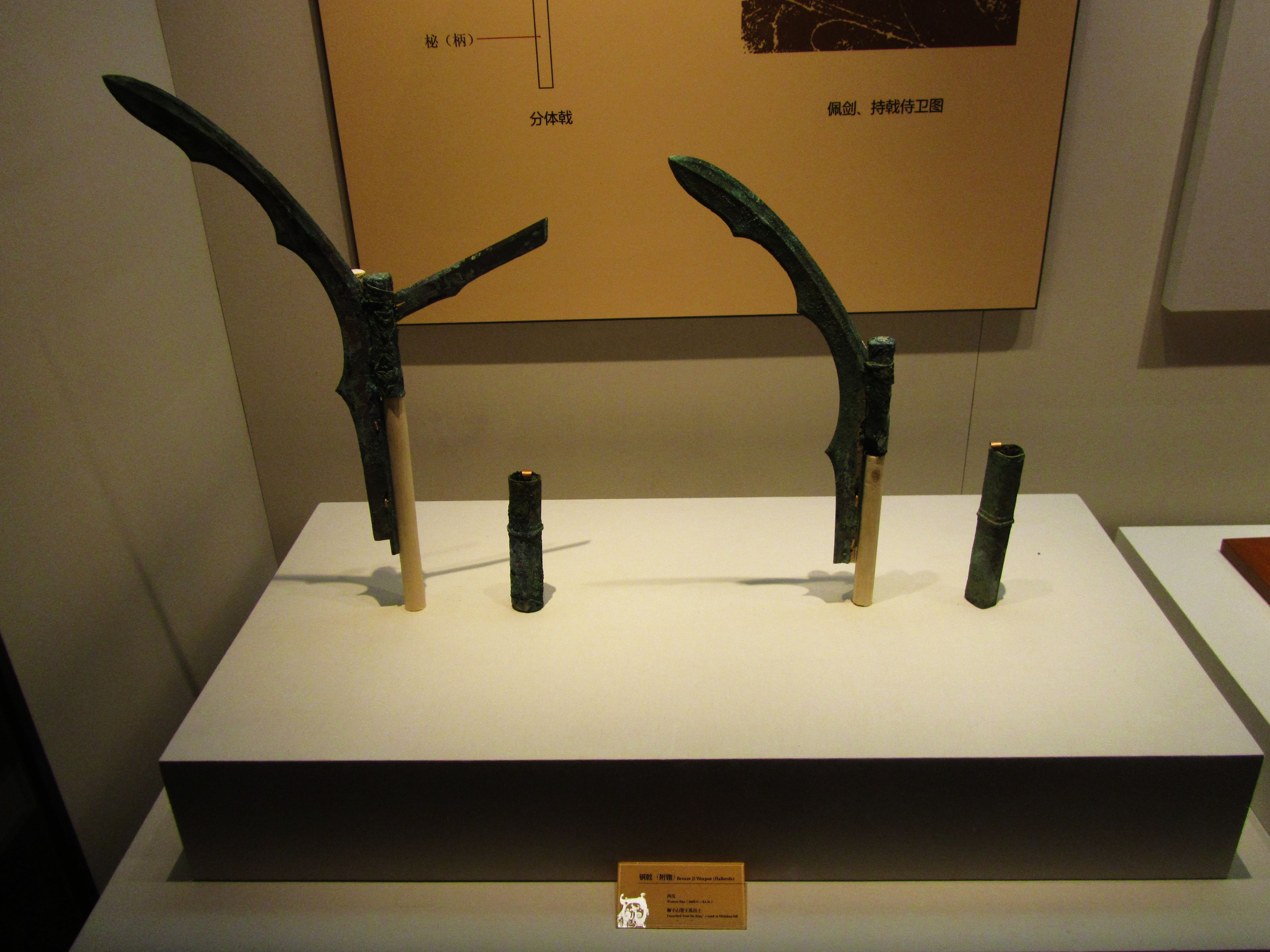
"Male halberds" (xiong ji, 雄戟), so called because they have an erect blade

Early handheld weapons included the dagger-axe, a bronze blade mounted at right angles to a 0.9–1.8 m (2 ft 11 in – 5 ft 11 in) long shaft, and bronze spears roughly 2.1 m (6 ft 11 in) in length. The dagger-axe was the first Chinese weapon designed to kill other people. Battles were fought in open formation to allow for the swinging of dagger-axes.

== Spring and Autumn period (771–476 BC) ==
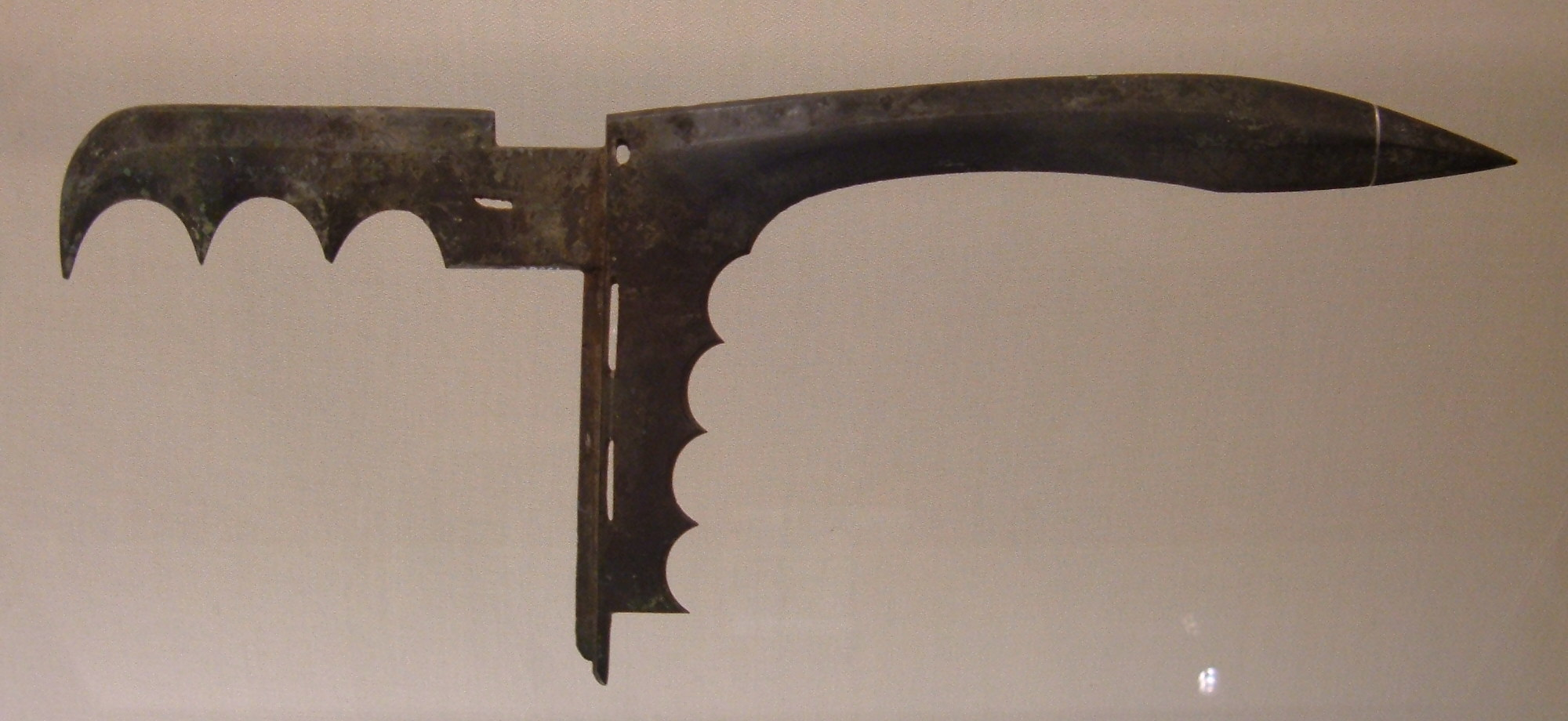
Scythed dagger-axe

By the late Spring and Autumn period, jians lengthened to about 56 cm (22 in). At this point at least some soldiers used the jian rather than the dagger-axe due to its greater flexibility and portability.

China started producing steel in the 6th century BC, but it was not until later on that iron and steel implements were produced in useful amounts. By around 500 BC however the sword and shield combination began to be regarded as superior to the spear and dagger-axe.

== Warring States period (475–221 BC) ==
By the end of the 4th century BC, dagger-axes with spearheads began to appear, essentially becoming a halberd. Spears and halberds came in two general sizes. One about 2.8 m (9 ft 2 in) long and the other around 5.5 m (18 ft) in length, or what would be considered a pike in western terminology. According to Wu Qi, tall men were given bows and arrows while short men spears and halberds.

Halberds and spears marked the rise of mass warfare and the departure of aristocratic dominance of the battlefield. War became the activity of commoners and the knightly class, rather than an arena for proving aristocratic identity. At least in the Warring States period, the halberd and spear were the individual weapons of soldiers fighting en masse, not the individualistic weapons of an outstanding warrior. We have no mention of anyone fighting an individual contest with a halberd or spear, in sharp contrast to battle descriptions of aristocrats shooting at each other with arrows.

— Peter Lorge

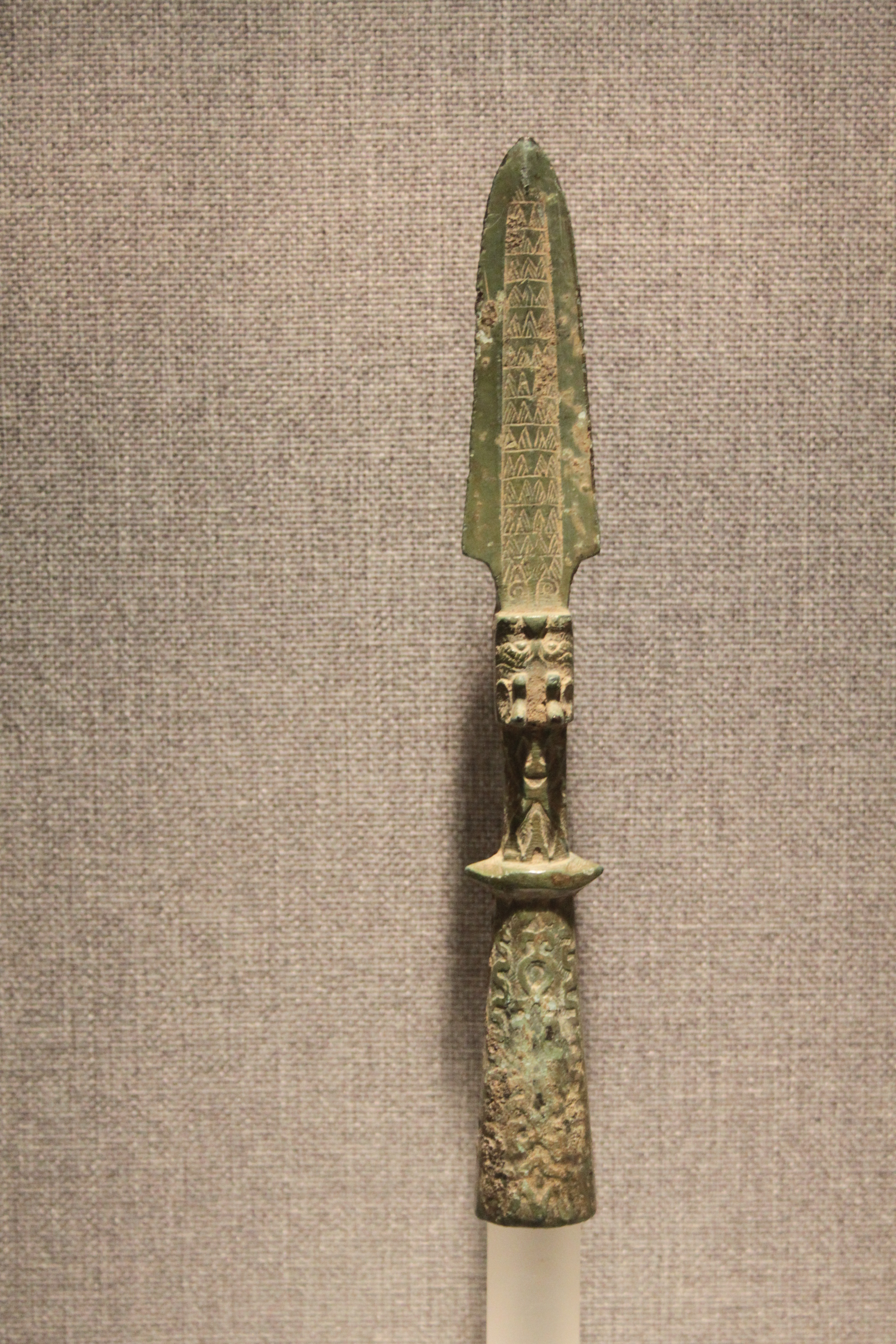
Eastern Zhou bronze spear (qiang)

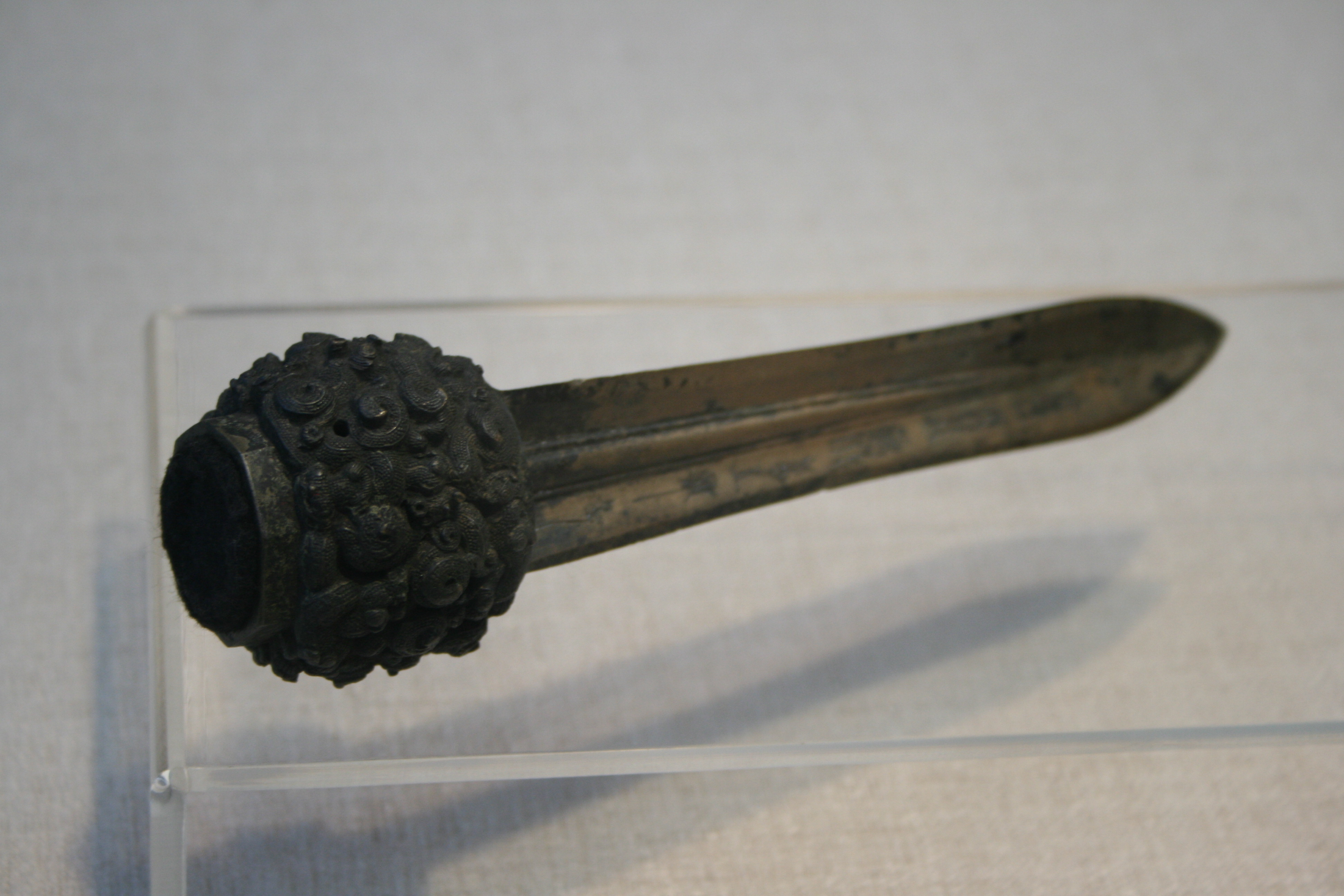
A shu (殳): three-edged spearhead with an octagonal end-head from the Tomb of Marquis Yi of Zeng

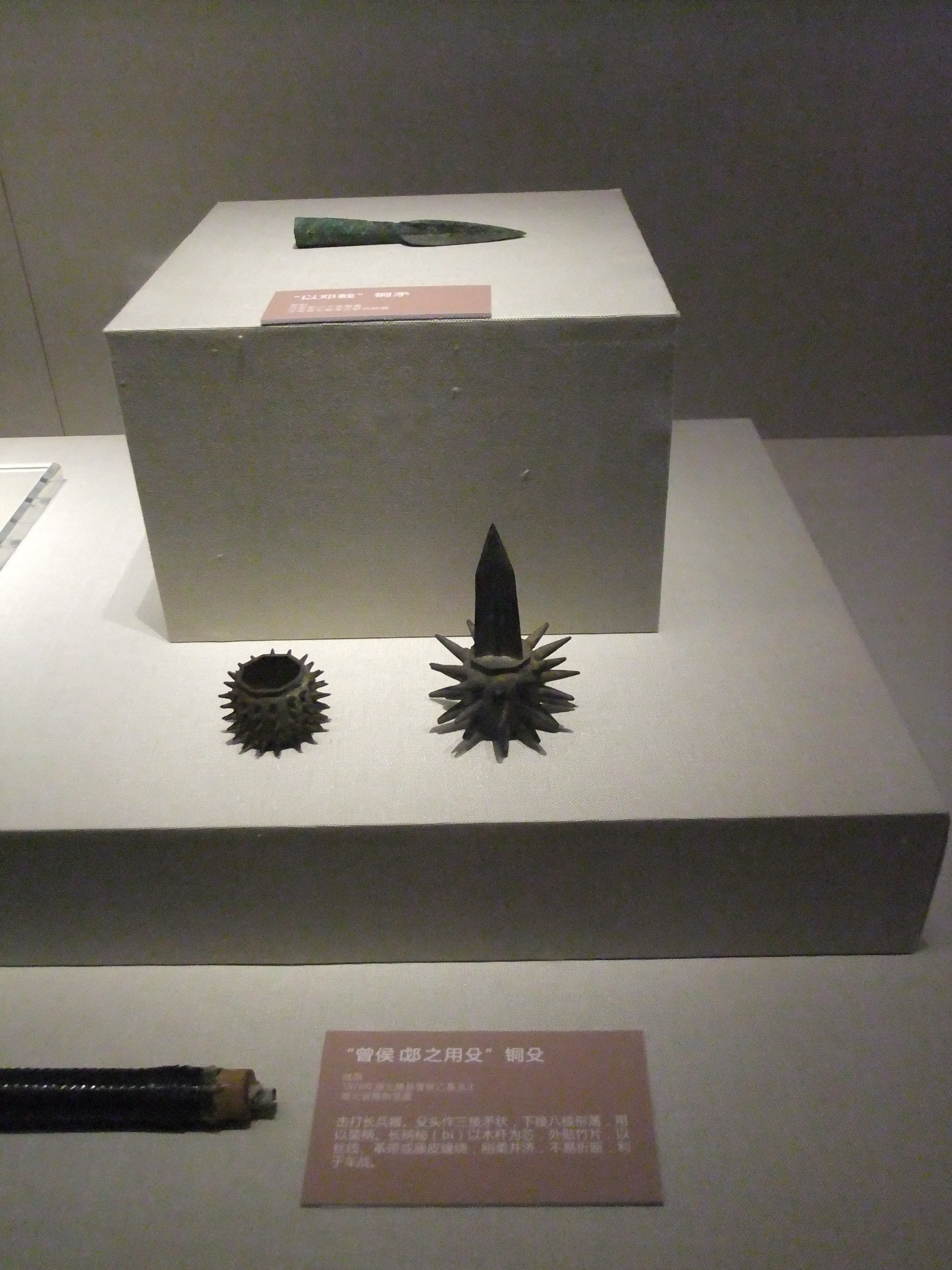
Mace spear from the Tomb of Marquis Yi of Zeng

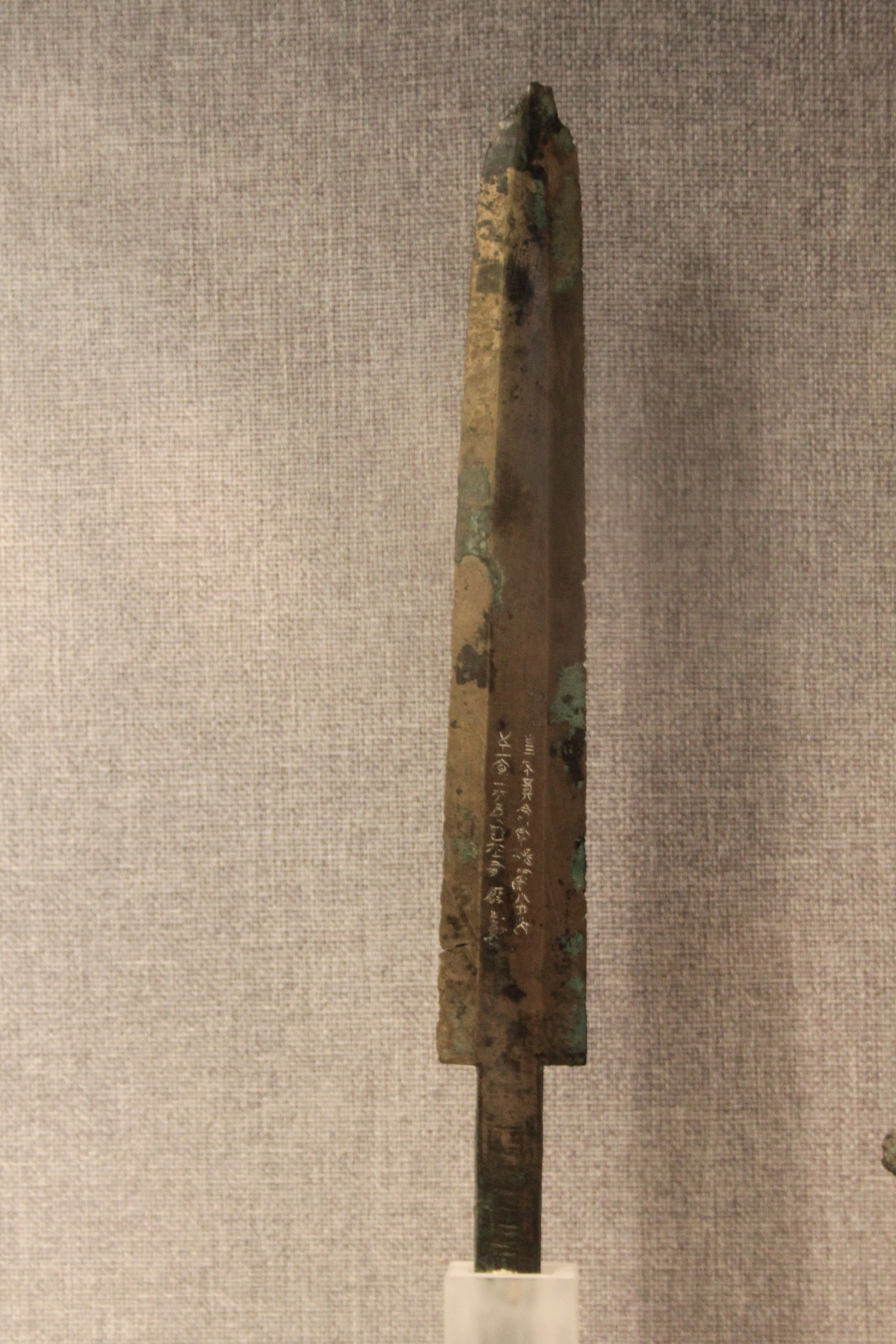
Warring States lance (pi)

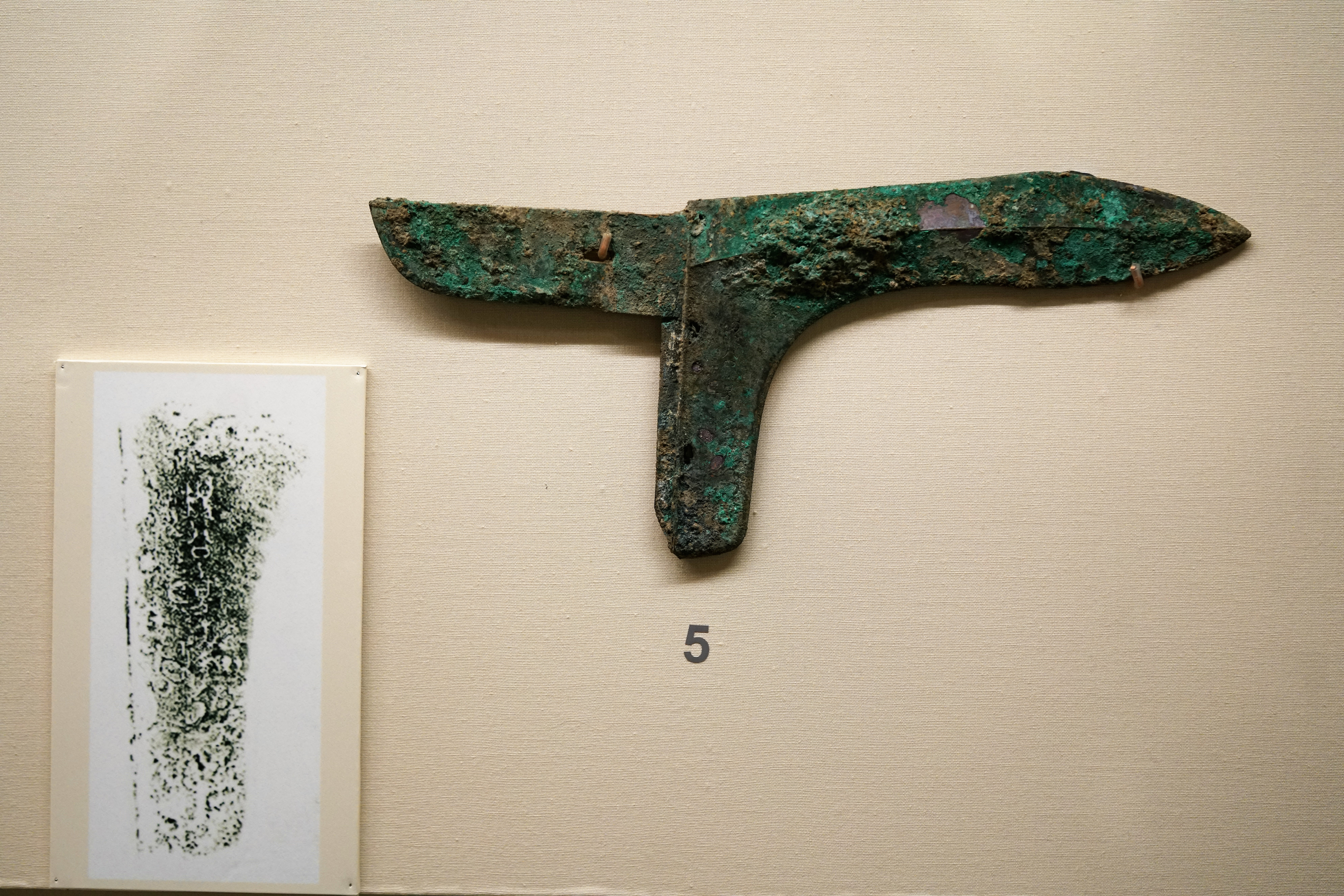
Dagger-axe (ge, 戈)

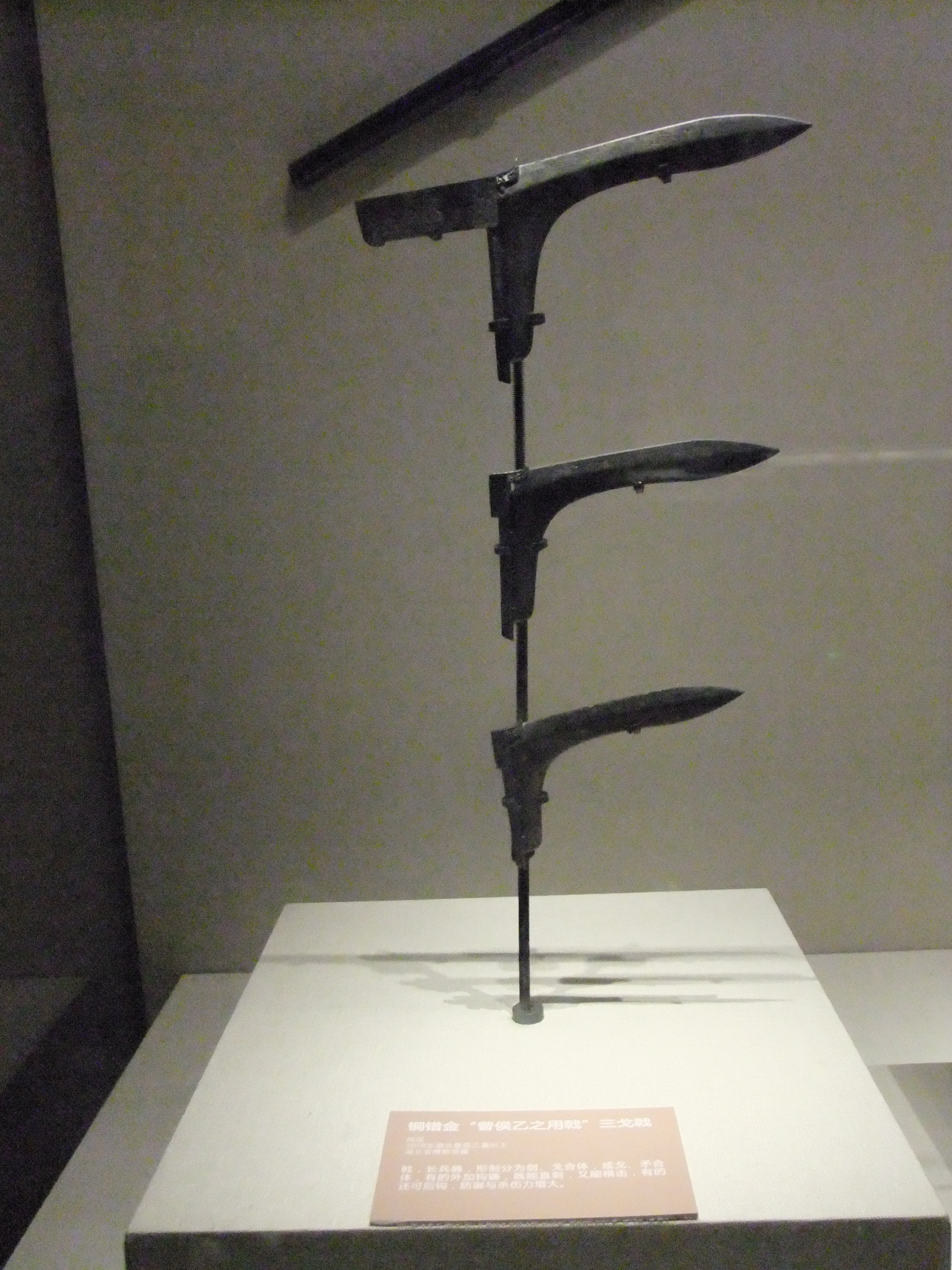
Triple dagger-axe

== Han dynasty (206 BC – 220 AD) ==
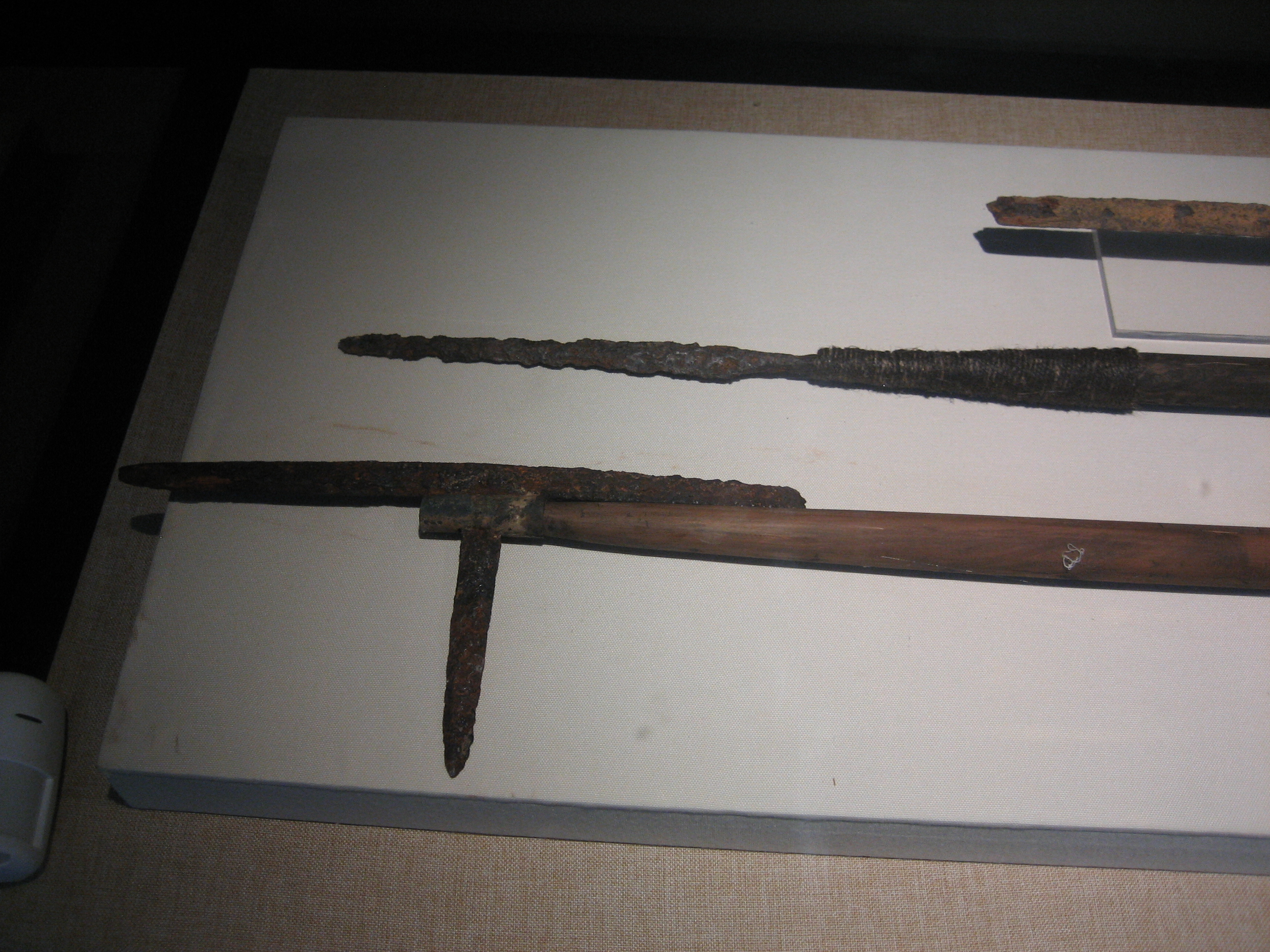
Ji halberd, Han dynasty

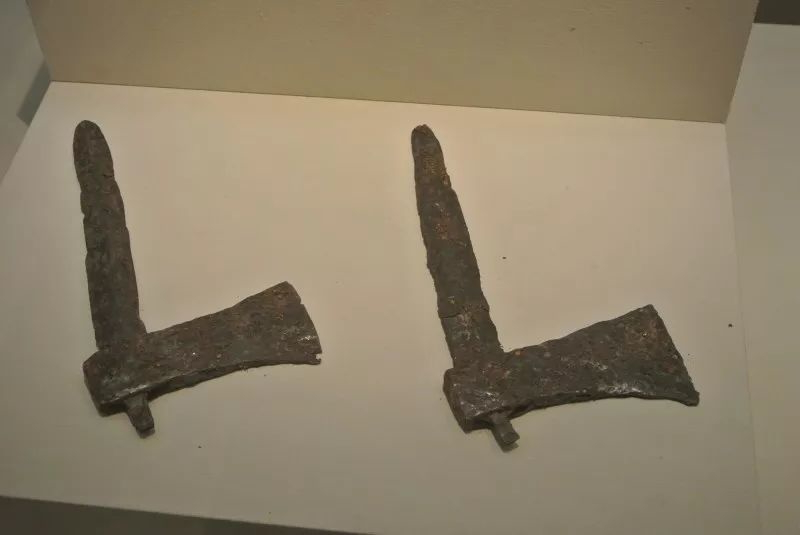
Han axe halberds (yueji)

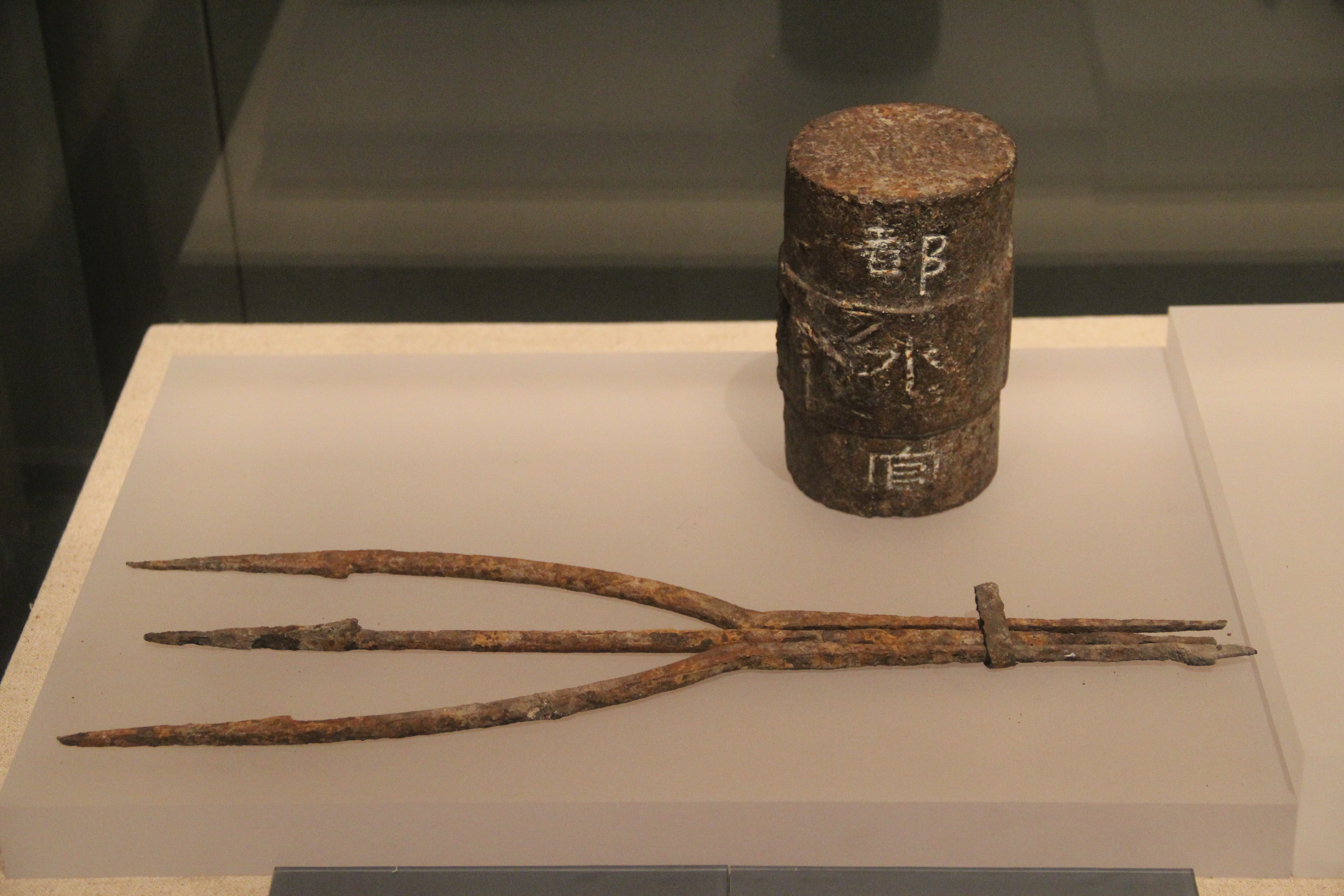
Trident and hammer, Han dynasty

The jian was mentioned as one of the "Five Weapons" during the Han dynasty, the other four being dao, spear, halberd, and staff. Another version of the Five Weapons lists the bow and crossbow as one weapon, the jian and dao as one weapon, in addition to halberd, shield, and armour.

Han dynasty inventory list (13 BC)
Item	Inventory	Imperial Heirloom
Bronze dagger-axe (ge)	632	563
Spear (qiang)	52,555	2,377
Long lance (pi)	451,222	1,421
Long lance (sha)	24,167	
Halberd (ji)	6,634	
Sword (jian)	99,905	4
Sabre (dao)	156,135	
Sawing dao	30,098	
Great dao	127	232
Iron axe	1,132	136
Dagger	24,804	
Shield	102,551	
Crossbow	537,707	11,181
Bow	77,52	
Bolts	11,458,424	34,265
Arrows	1,199,316	511
Youfang (identity unknown)	78,393	

During the Battle of Zhizhi in 36 BC, the Chinese deployed their troops in three sections, with men carrying 'great shields' in front, spearmen behind them, and crossbowmen in the rear.

An account of Duan Jiong's tactical formation in 167 AD specifies that he arranged "three ranks of halberds (長鏃 changzu), swordsmen (利刃 liren) and spearmen (長矛 changmao), supported by crossbows (強弩 qiangnu), with light cavalry (輕騎 jingji) on each wing."

The characters zu and mao both indicate lances or spears, but I suspect the changzu may have had two blades or points. Such weapons, commonly identified as 戟 ji, but also as 鈹 pi and 錟 tan, have been known from early times. Some bronze horsemen found in the tomb at Leitai 雷台 by present-day Wuwei are armed with halberds. An alternative rendering for changzu would be “javelin,” but javelins were not common in ancient China.

— Rafe de Crespigny

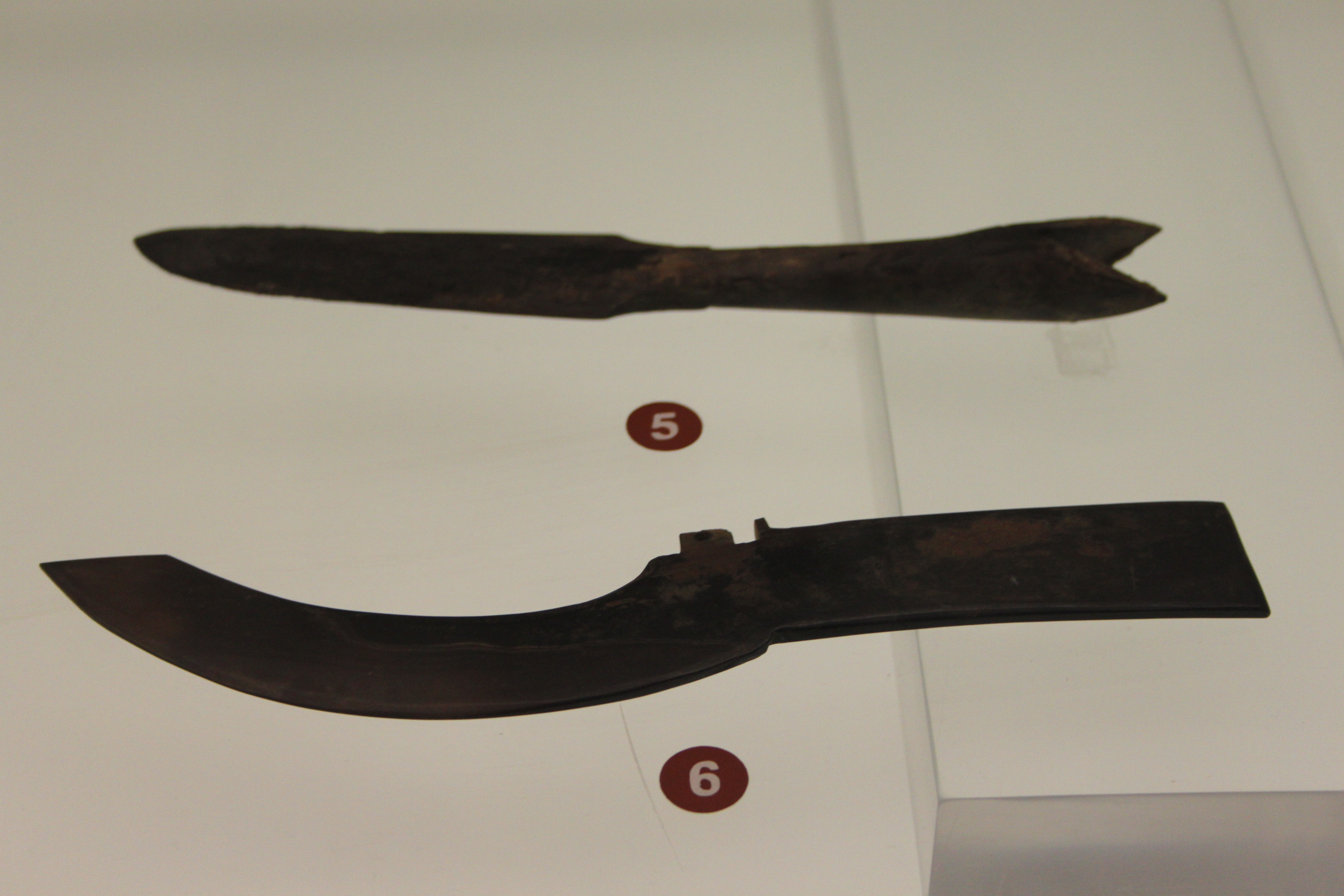
Spear and glaive polearm, Han dynasty

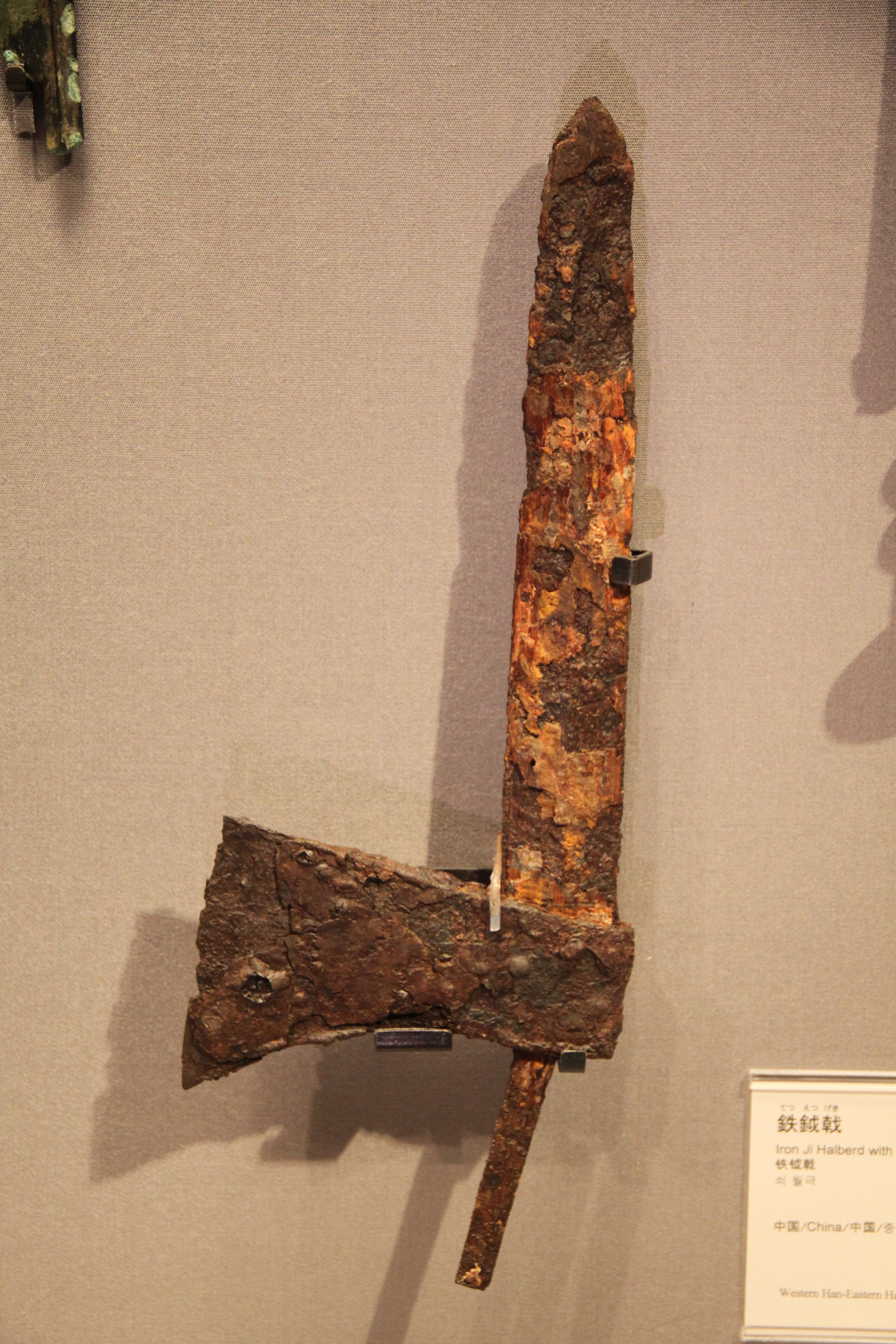
Axe halberd (yueji) variant, Han dynasty

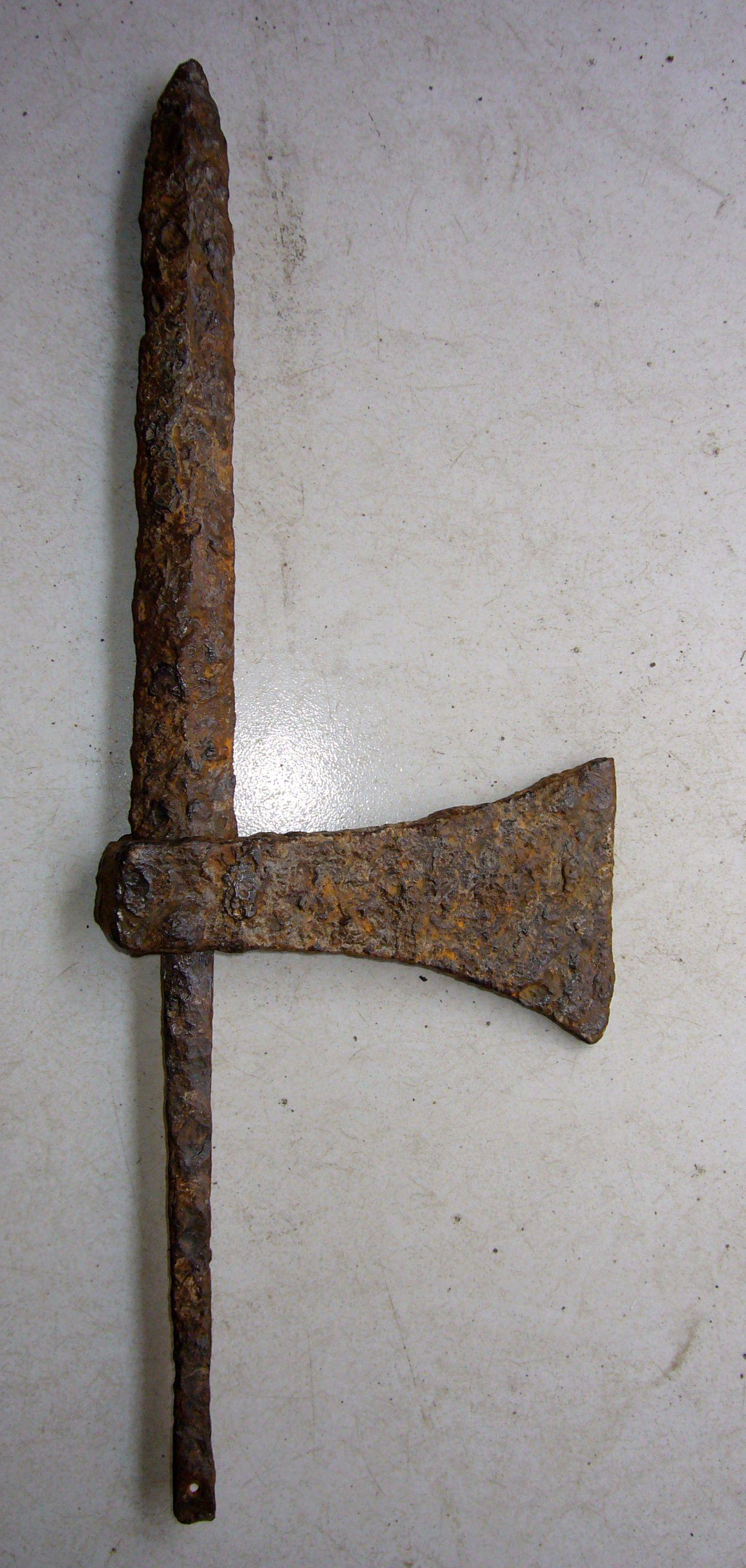
Han axe halberd (yueji)

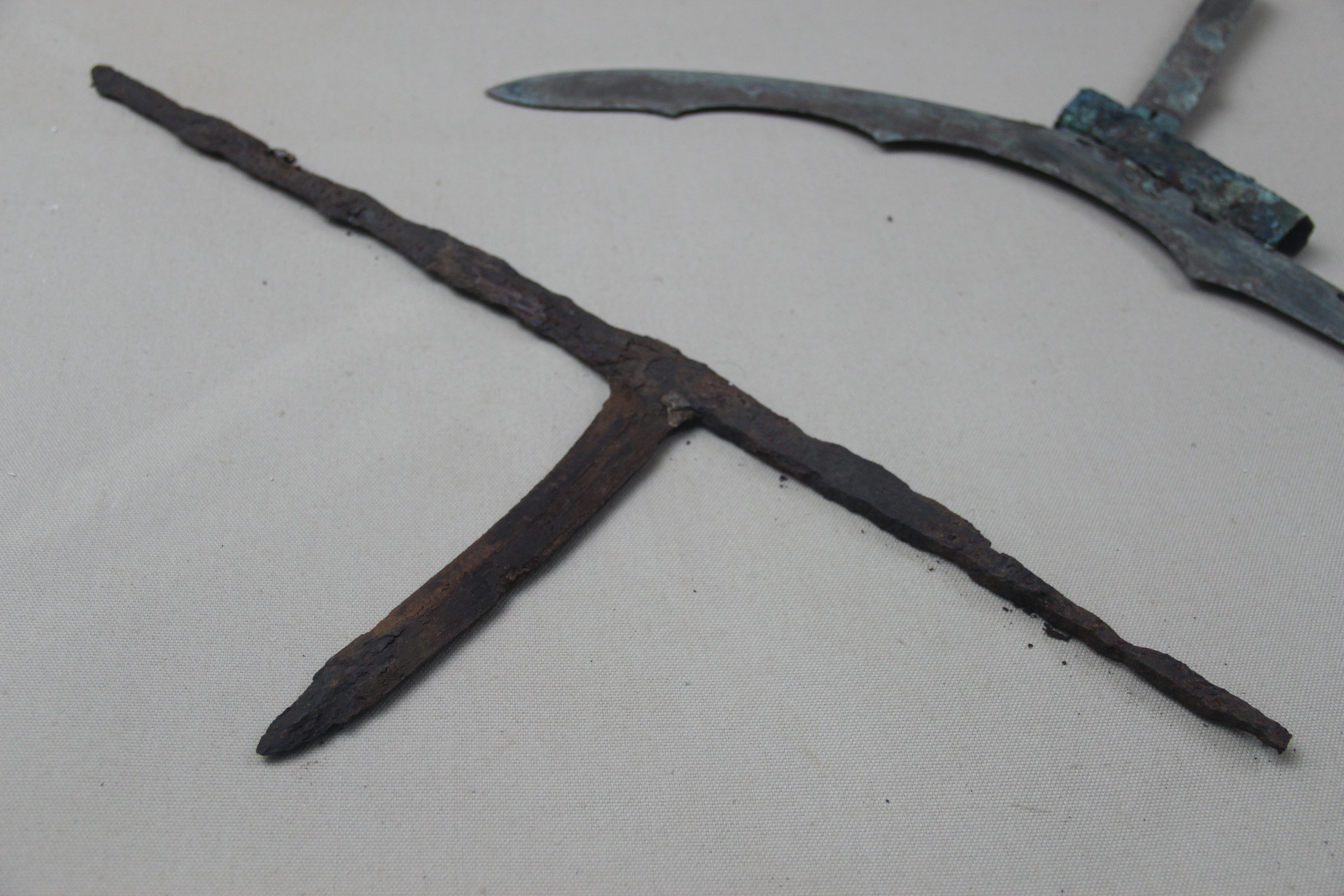
One piece ji, Han dynasty

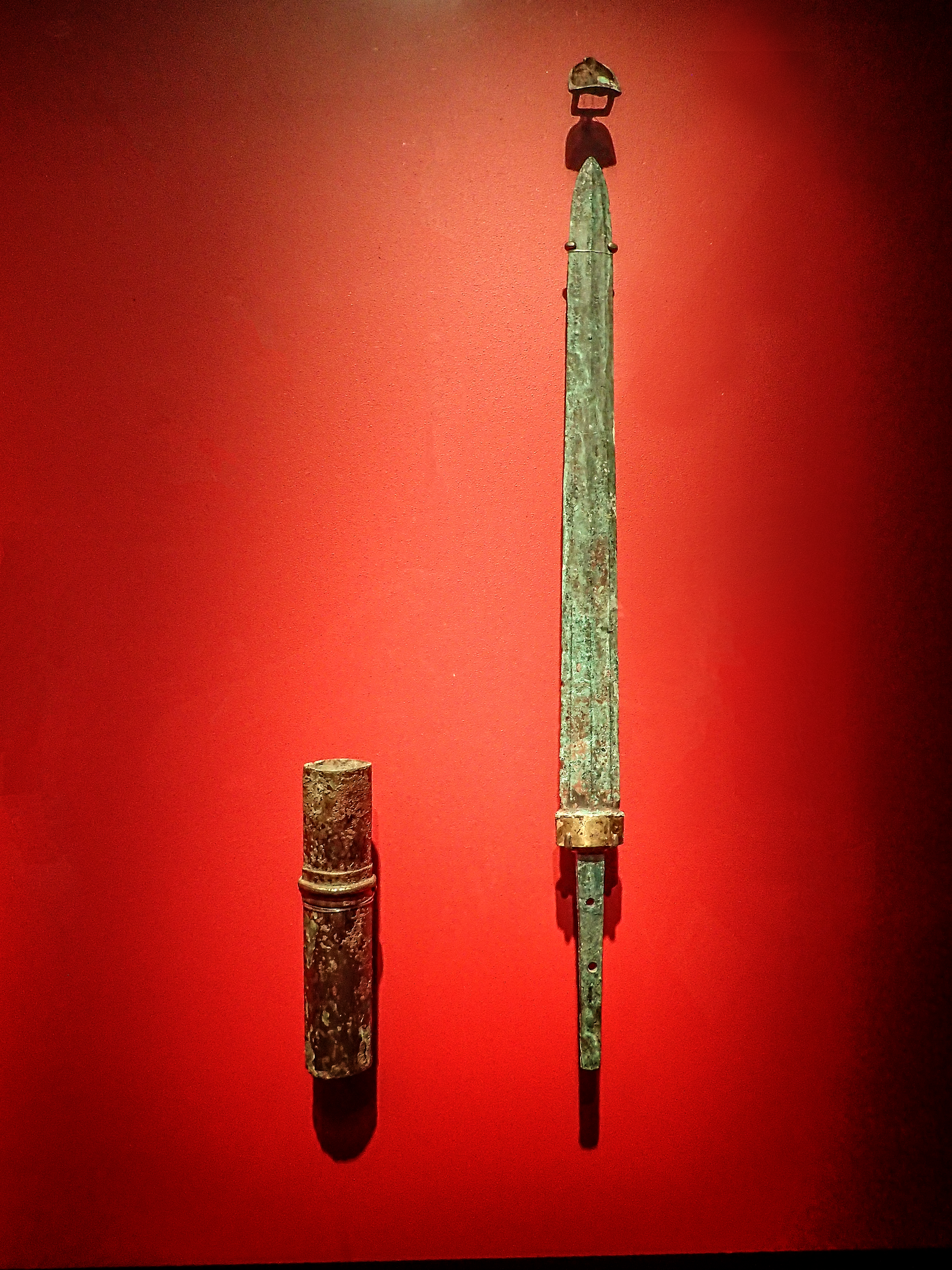
Sword-staff/lance (pi), Han dynasty

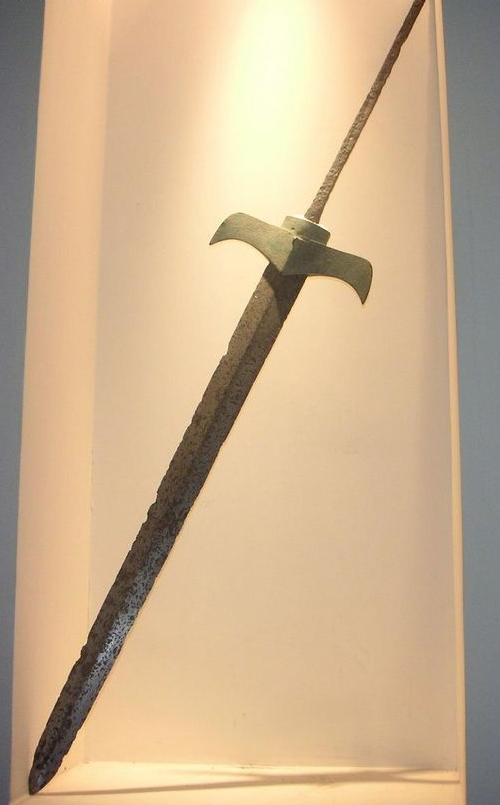
Spear with a mini trident guard known as sha (鎩)

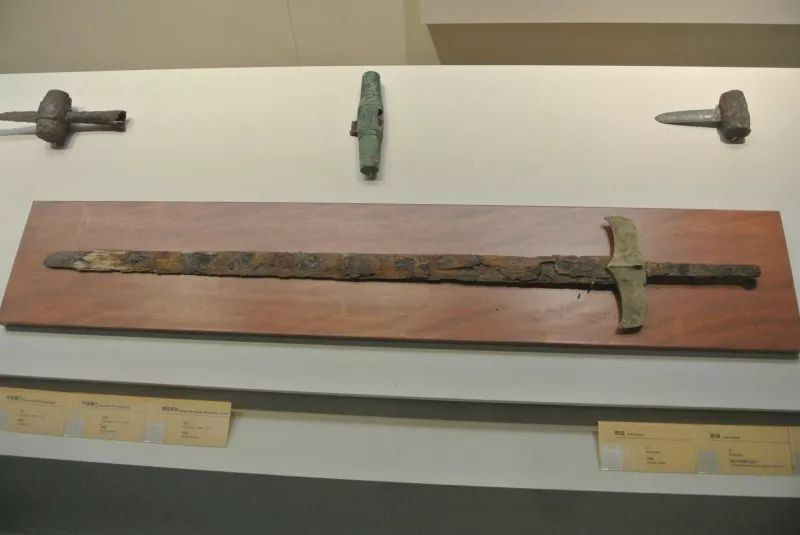
A sha spear

== Three Kingdoms (184/220–280) ==
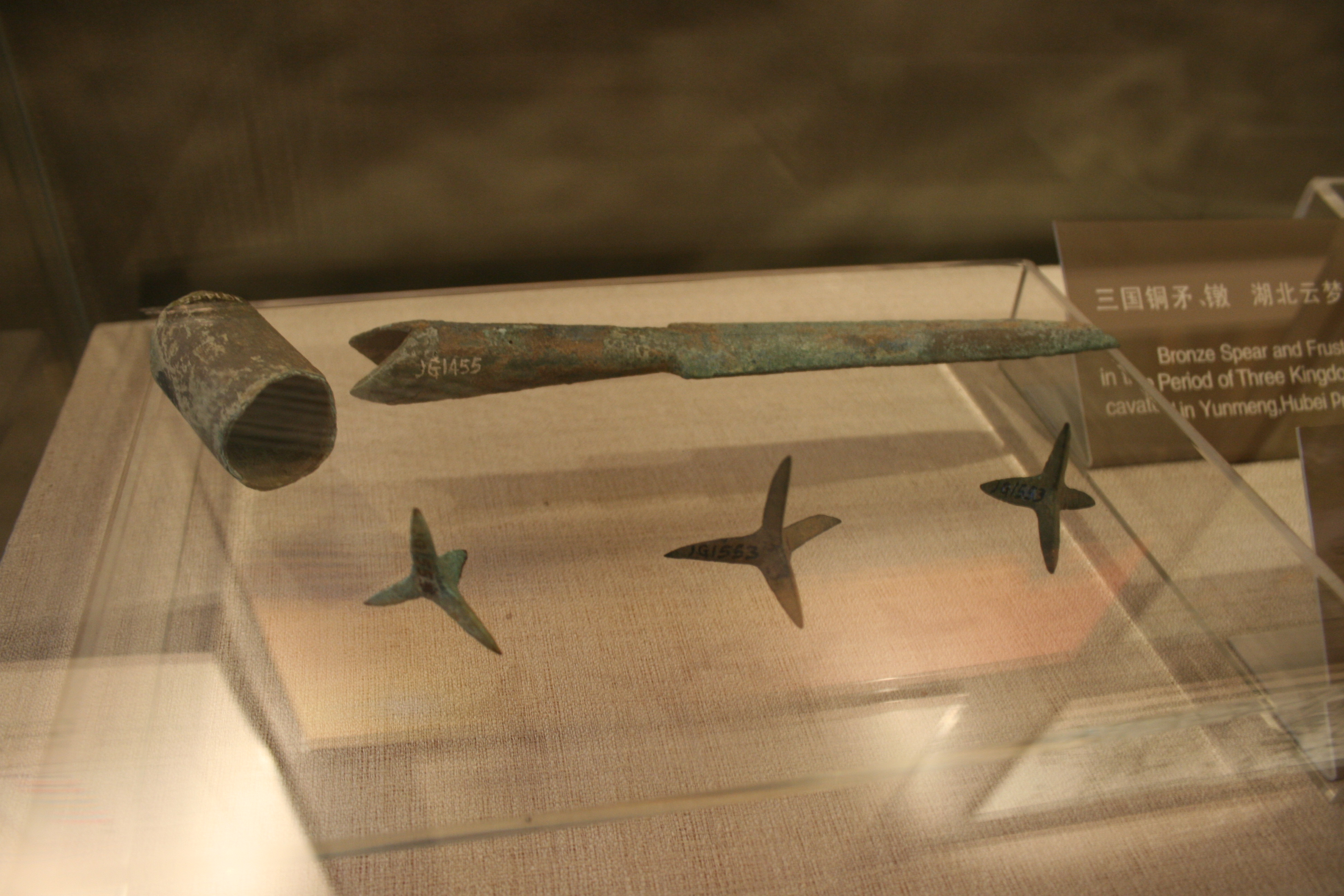
Three Kingdoms caltrops and spearhead

Halberds became less common during the Three Kingdoms period due to its weight in comparison to the spear. However idiosyncratic weapons such as double ended halberds, one handed halberds, or paired halberds are mentioned to have been used by noteworthy warriors in their biographies.

Spear throwing was uncommon among Chinese troops, but was practiced by tribesmen in northwestern China during the 3rd and 4th centuries.

== Tang dynasty (618–907) ==
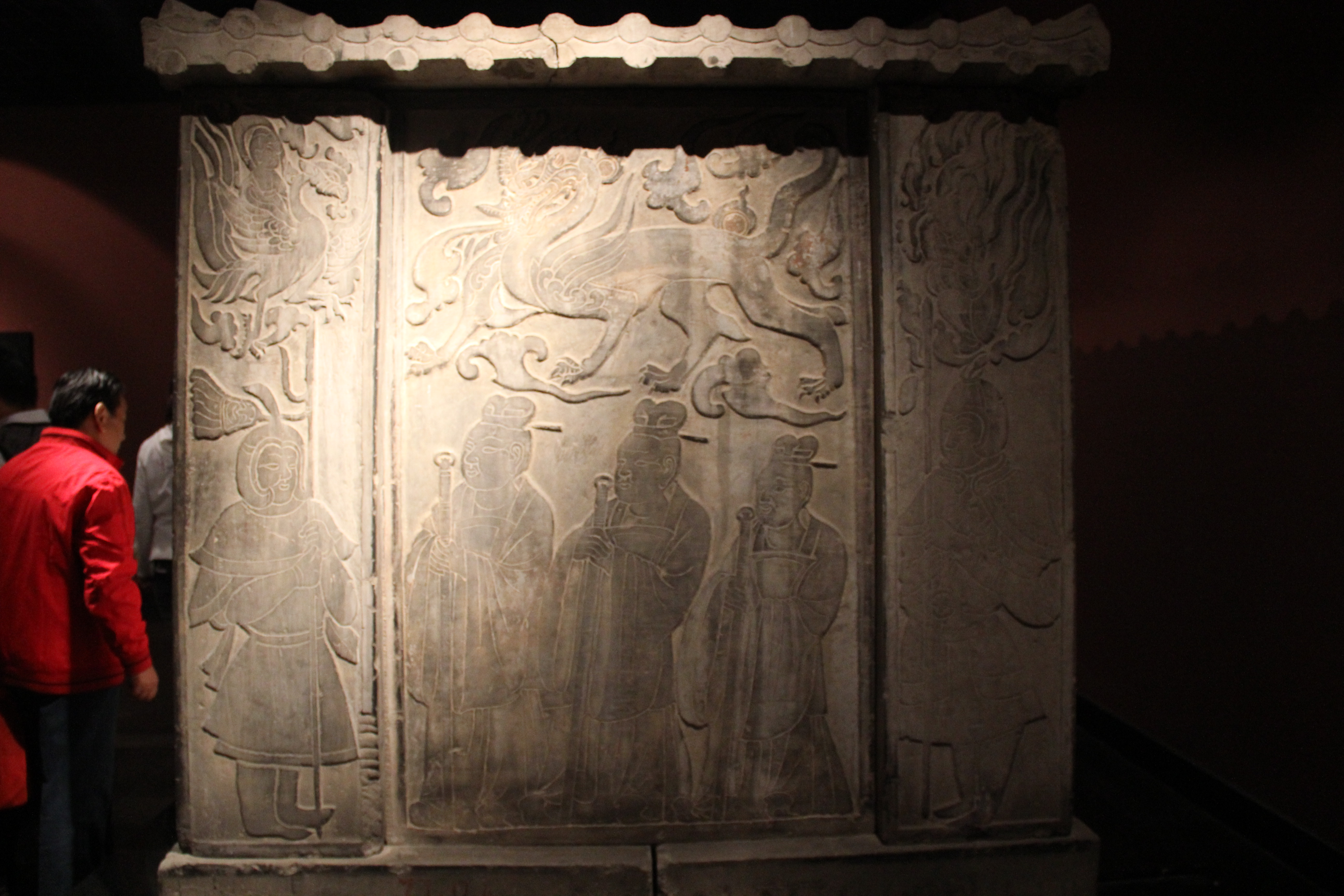
ㄐ-shaped halberds (ji) from the Tomb of Li Shou, 7th century

According to Tang texts, spearmen were all supposed to carry a bow and crossbowmen to be armed with halberds for self-defense, but it is unclear how well this worked in practice.

== Song dynasty (960–1279) ==
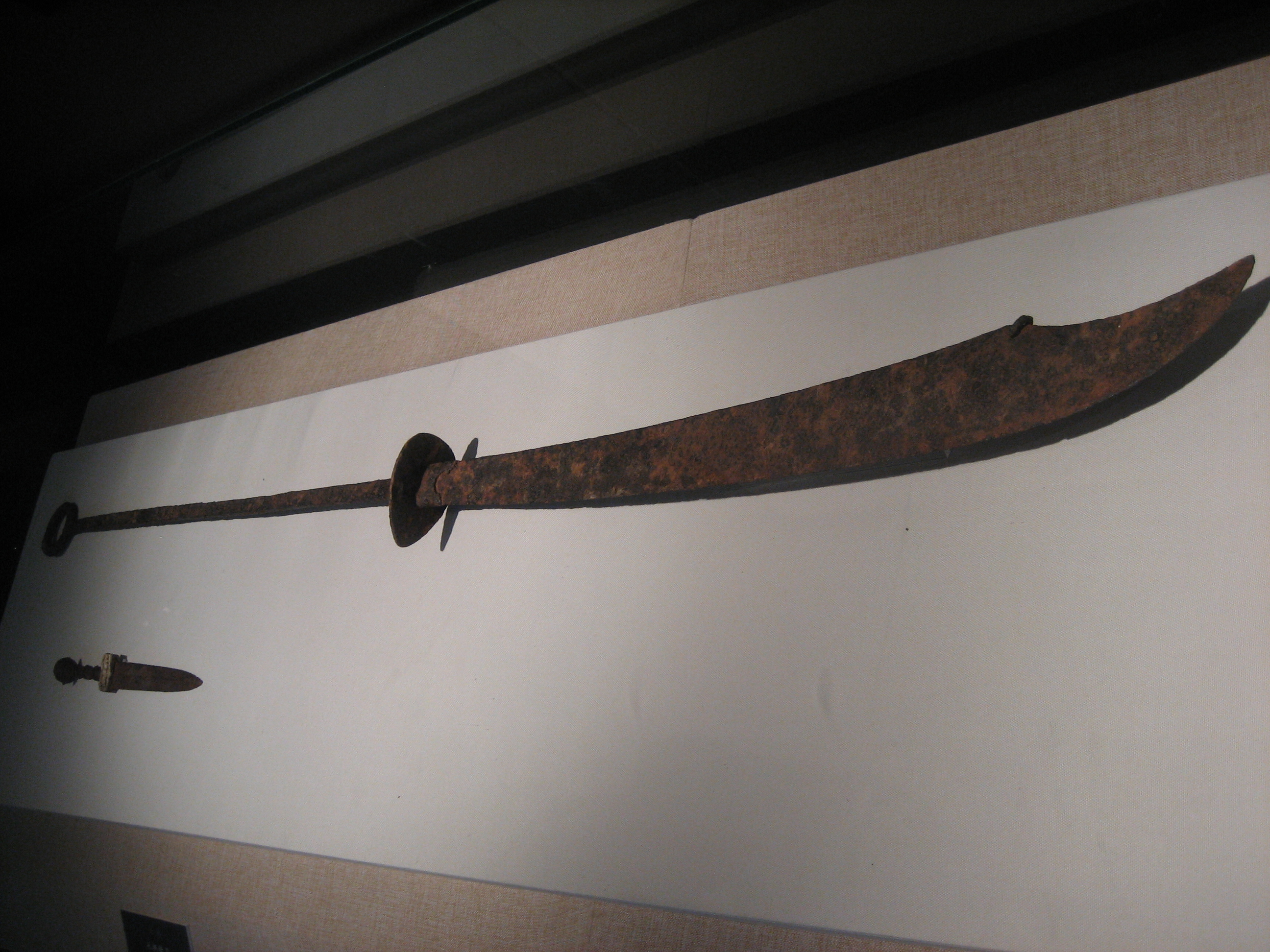
A Song dynasty or Yuan dynasty guandao, an anti-cavalry glaive weapon

Song texts recommend using both mixed and non-mixed units. The practice of deploying crossbowmen in combination with shields and spears was common, but the Wujing Zongyao recommends that crossbowmen make up their own units and defeat enemies through firepower alone. Spears were also combined with gunpowder tubes to create the fire lance.

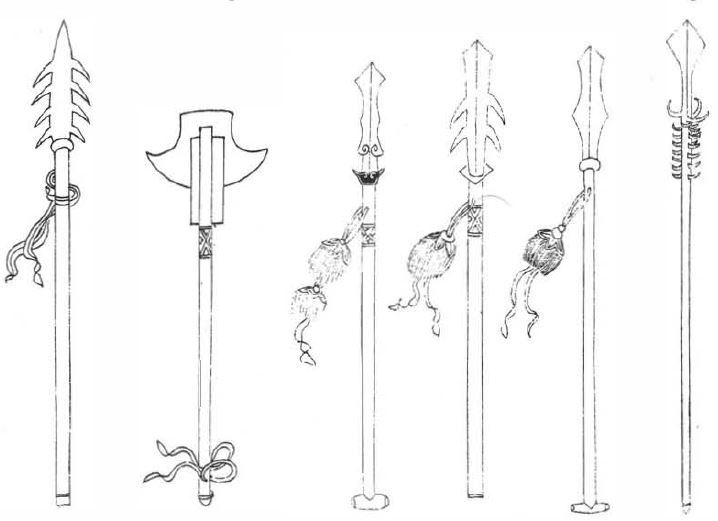
Various polearm weapons in the Wujing Zongyao

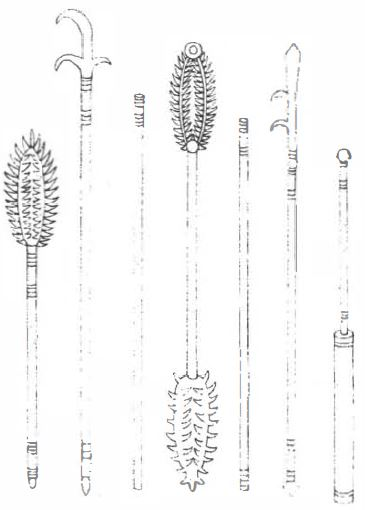
Various spiked maces and hook weapons in the Wujing Zongyao

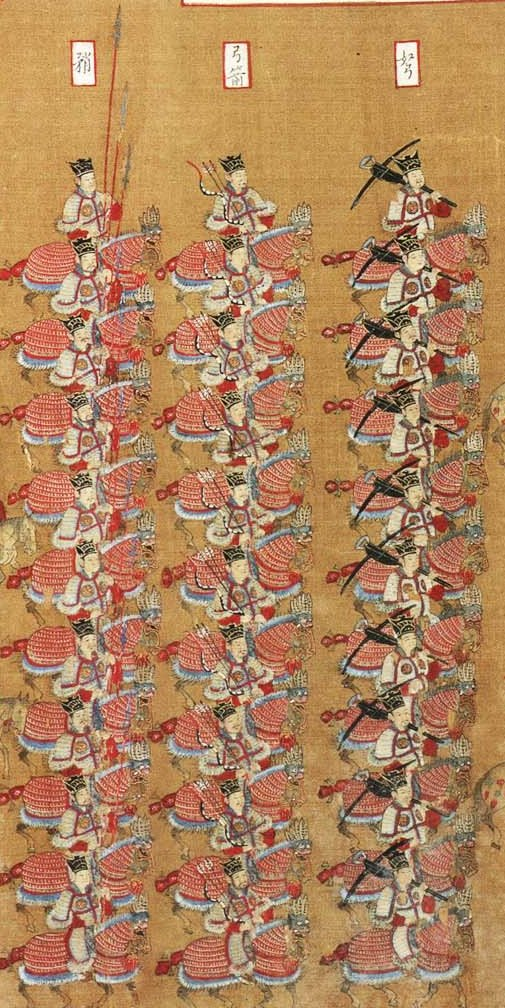
Song lancers

== Ming dynasty (1368–1644) ==
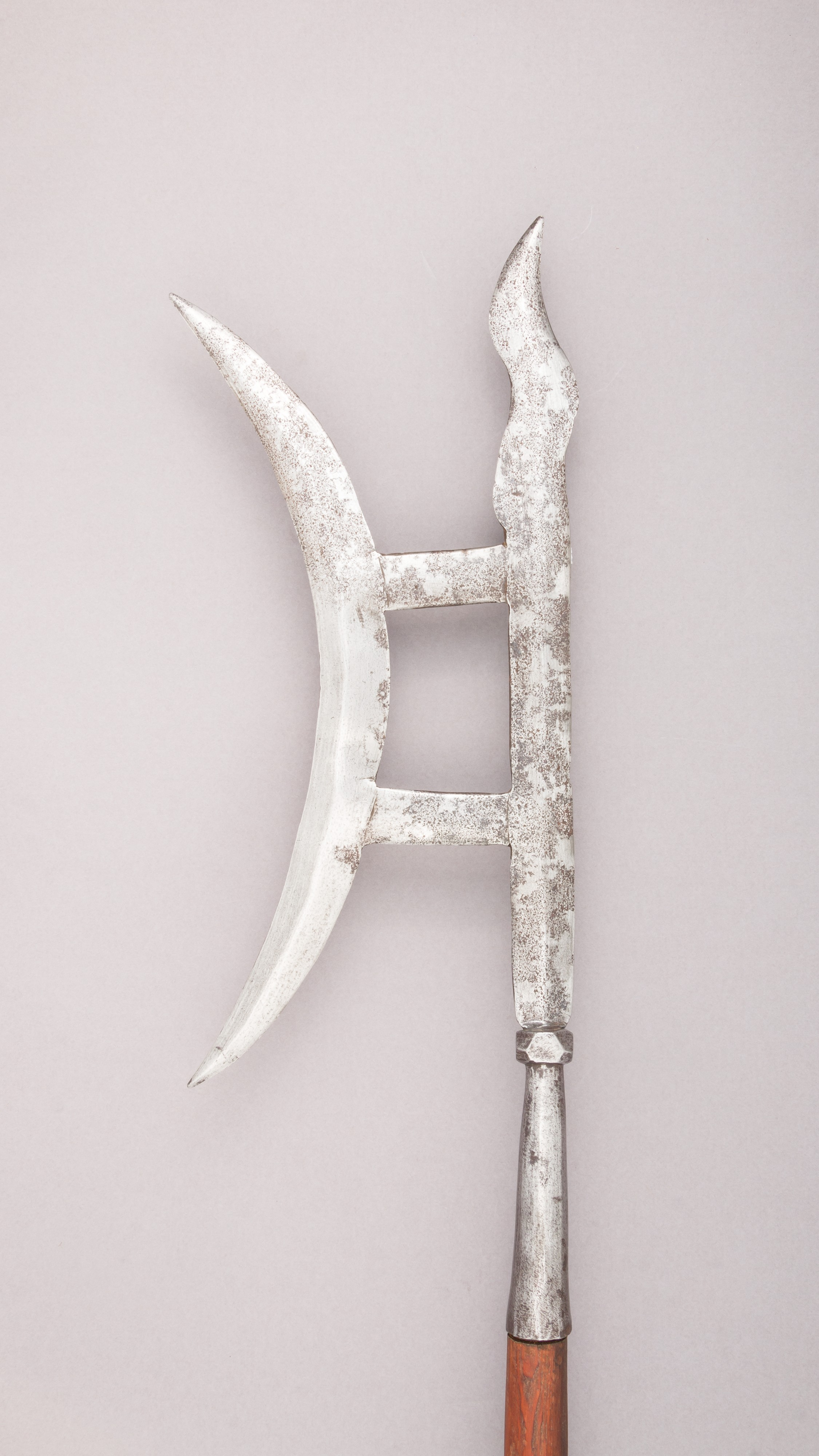
A ji polearm, 18th c.

Qi Jiguang deployed his soldiers in a 12-man 'mandarin duck' formation, which consisted of four pikemen, two men carrying daos with a great and small shield, two 'wolf brush' wielders, a rearguard officer, and a porter. A rearguard of two men with three-pronged fire-lances [later replaced by musketeers], an officer, and a porter, completed the squad. This arrangement may seem rather inefficient, with only one man in three actually equipped for offensive action, but in the context of Qi's isolated command, with plenty of peasant manpower available but no capacity for manufacturing sophisticated weapons, it was no doubt a logical approach.

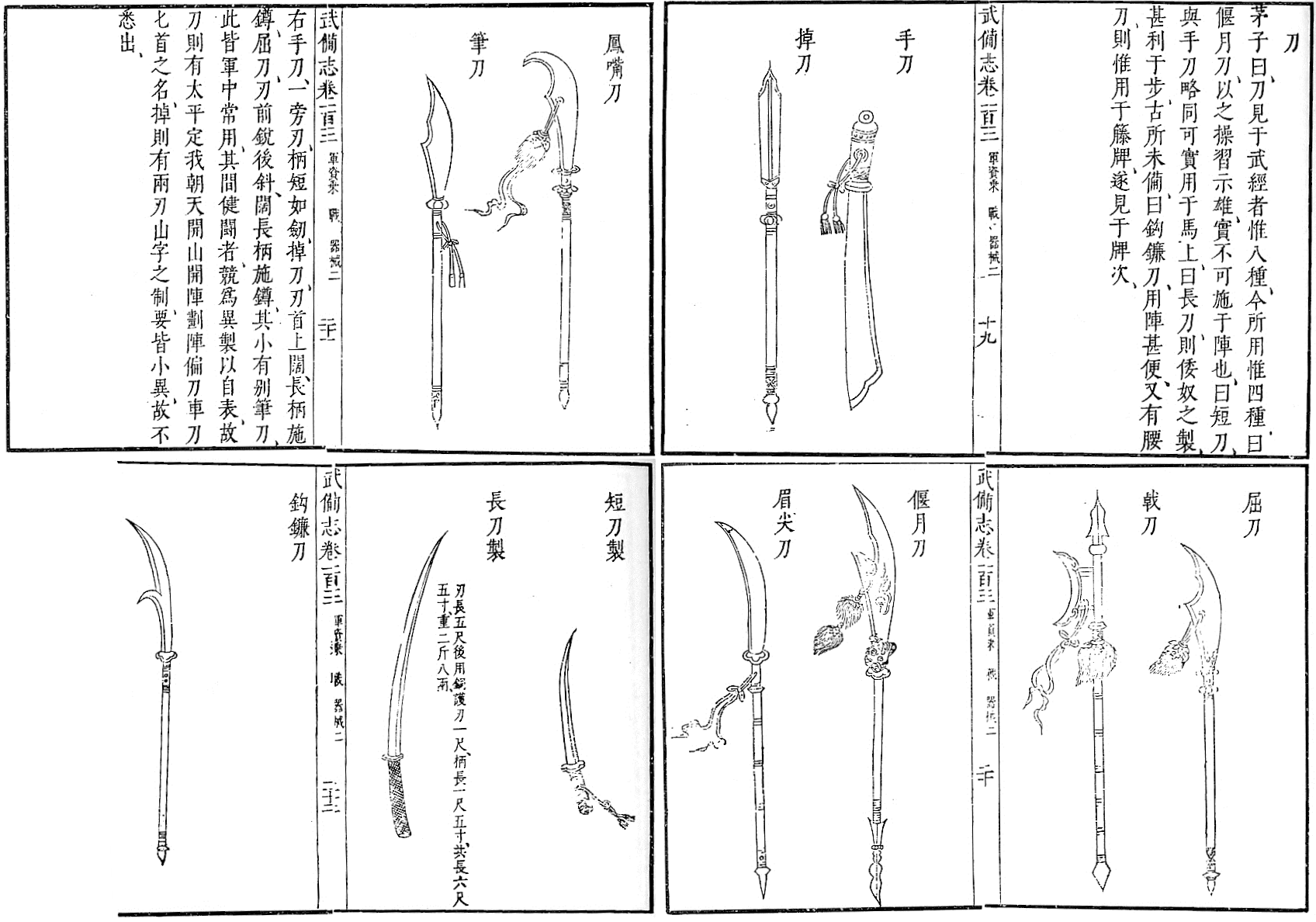
Ming dynasty glaives and sabers

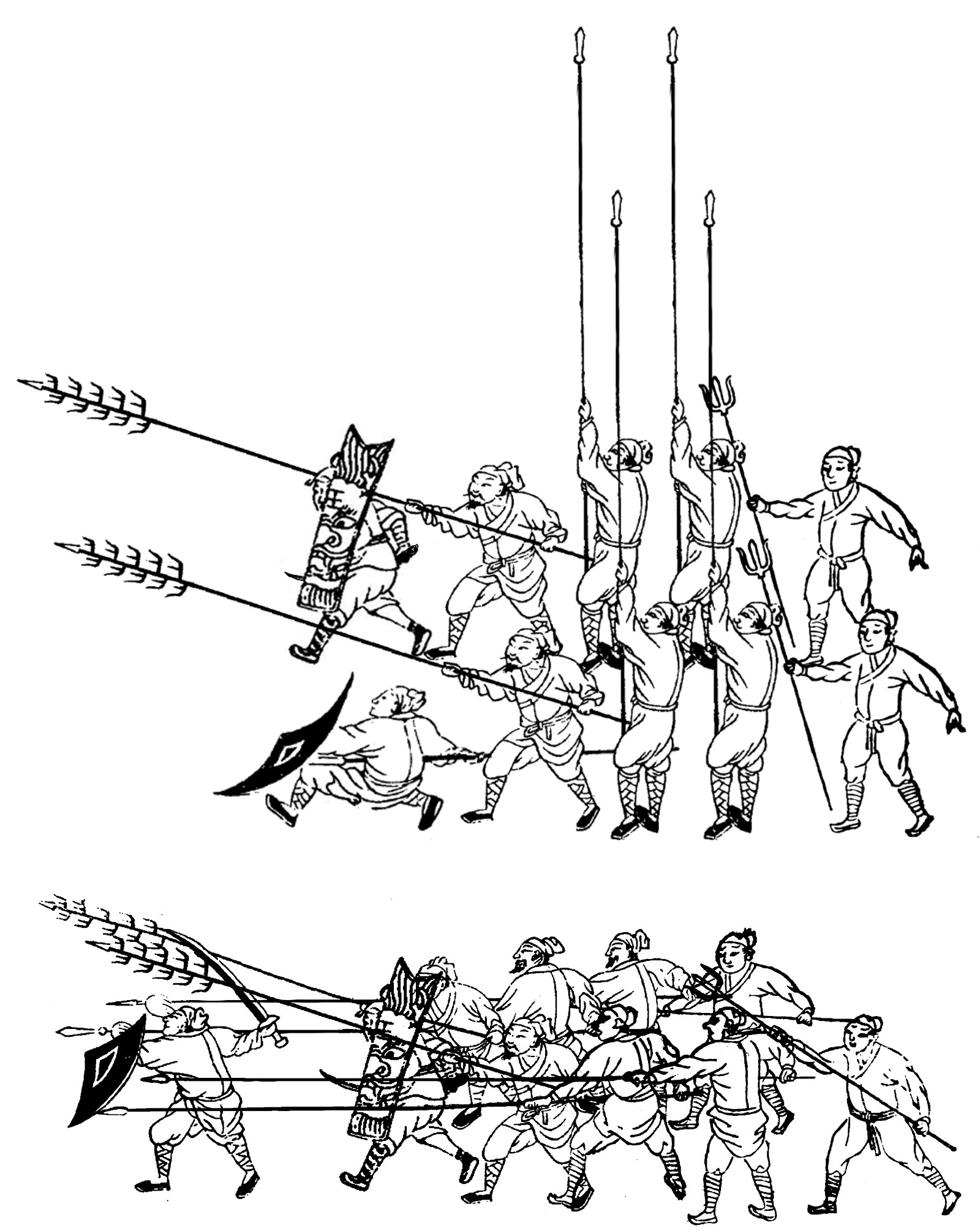
Qi Jiguang's 'mandarin duck formation' in standby and combat.

Bamboo wolf brush stick

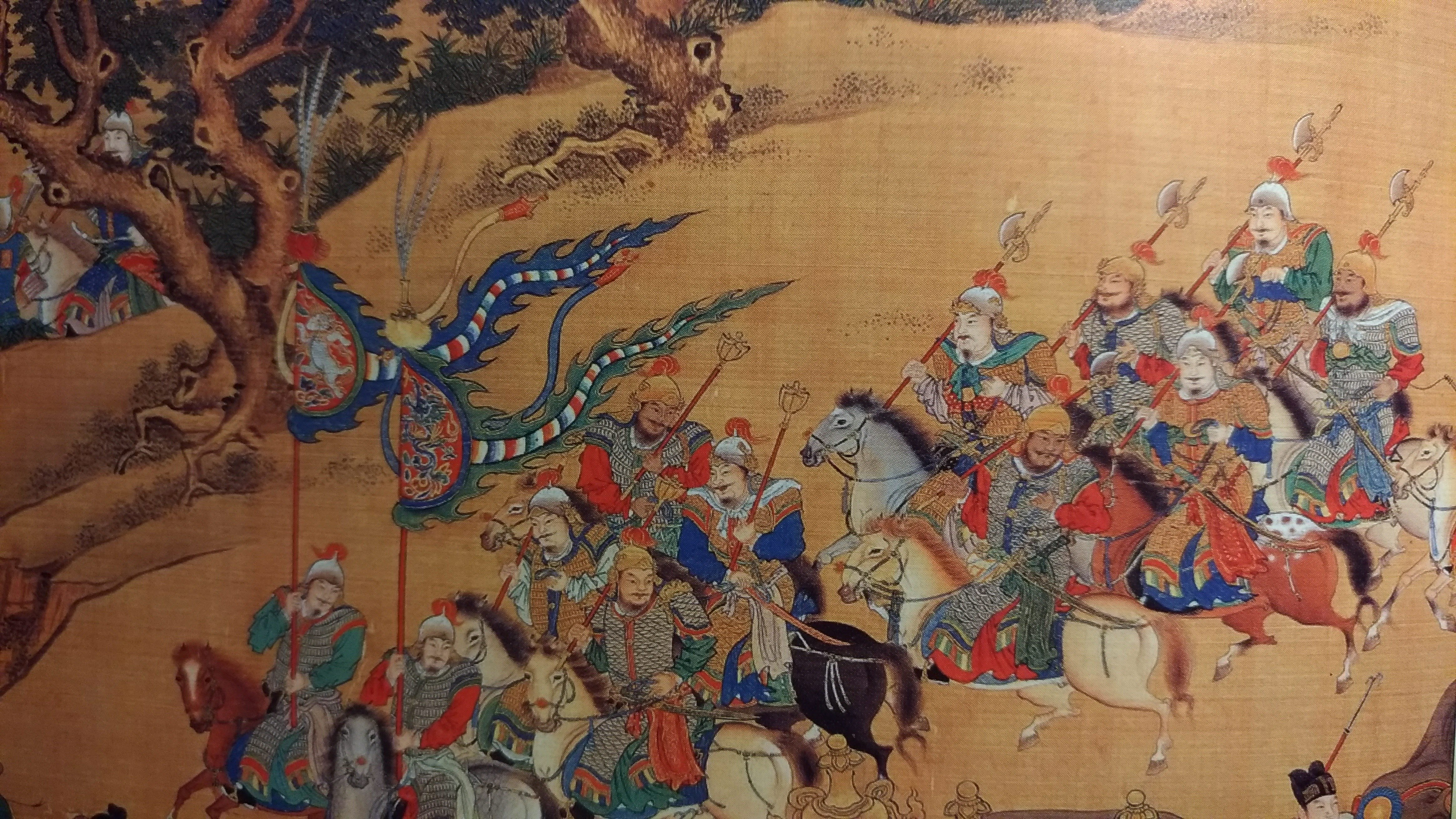
Ming dynasty mounted mace bearers and halberdiers

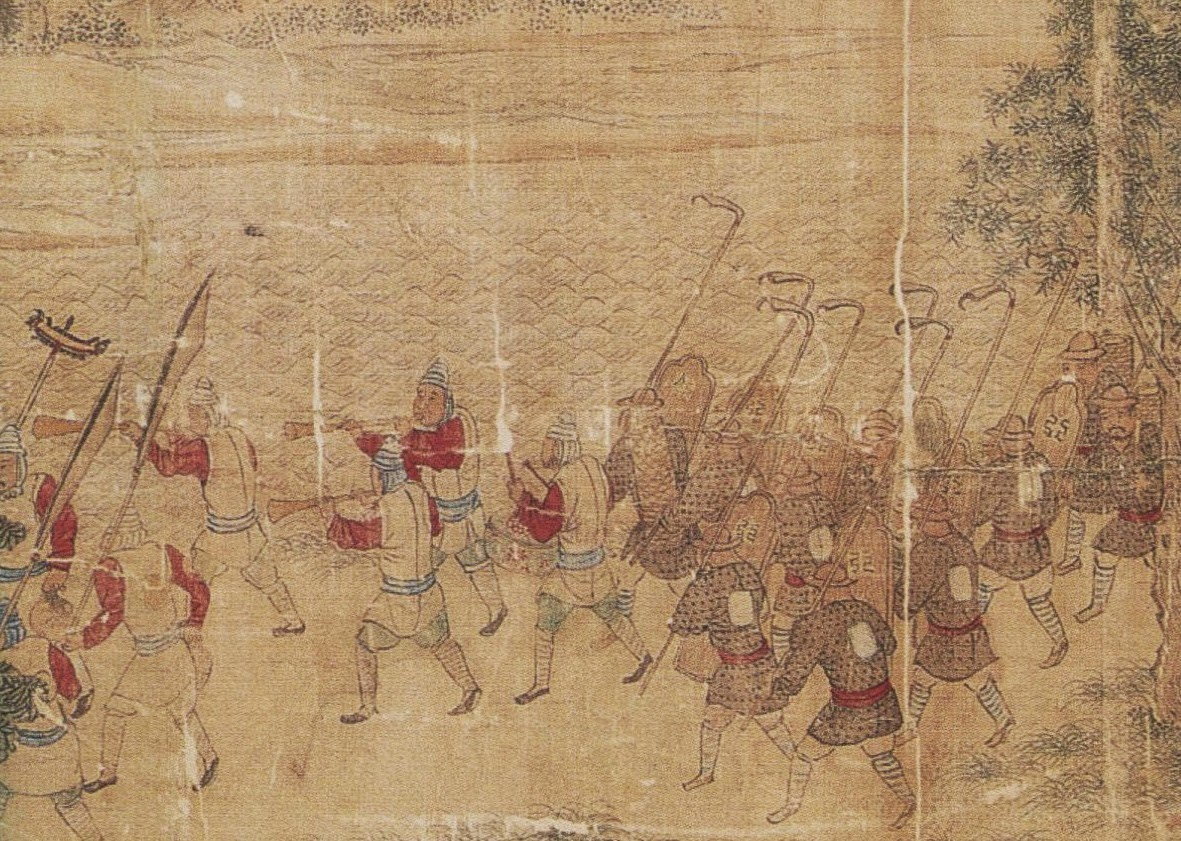
Southern "wolf troop" mercenaries carrying hooks and glaive weapons

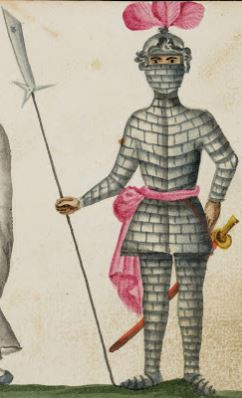
Dutch depiction of a Ming soldier holding a glaive weapon

== See also ==
- Chinese armour
- Chinese siege weapons

== Bibliography ==
- Andrade, Tonio (2016), The Gunpowder Age: China, Military Innovation, and the Rise of the West in World History, Princeton University Press, ISBN 978-0-691-13597-7.
- Coyet, Frederic (1975), Neglected Formosa: a translation from the Dutch of Frederic Coyett's Verwaerloosde Formosa
- Crespigny, Rafe de (2017), Fire Over Luoyang: A History of the Later Han Dynasty, 23-220 AD, Brill
- Graff, David A. (2002), Medieval Chinese Warfare, 300-900, Routledge
- Graff, David A. (2016), The Eurasian Way of War: Military practice in seventh-century China and Byzantium, Routledge
- Kitamura, Takai (1999), Zhanlue Zhanshu Bingqi: Zhongguo Zhonggu Pian, Gakken
- Lorge, Peter A. (2011), Chinese Martial Arts: From Antiquity to the Twenty-First Century, Cambridge: Cambridge University Press, ISBN 978-0-521-87881-4
- Lorge, Peter (2015), The Reunification of China: Peace through War under the Song Dynasty, Cambridge University Press
- Peers, C.J. (1990), Ancient Chinese Armies: 1500-200BC, Osprey Publishing
- Peers, C.J. (1992), Medieval Chinese Armies: 1260-1520, Osprey Publishing
- Peers, C.J. (1995), Imperial Chinese Armies (1): 200BC-AD589, Osprey Publishing
- Peers, C.J. (1996), Imperial Chinese Armies (2): 590-1260AD, Osprey Publishing
- Peers, C.J. (2006), Soldiers of the Dragon: Chinese Armies 1500 BC - AD 1840, Osprey Publishing Ltd
- Peers, Chris (2013), Battles of Ancient China, Pen & Sword Military
- Perdue, Peter C. (2005), China Marches West, The Belknap Press of Harvard University Press
- Robinson, K.G. (2004), Science and Civilization in China Volume 7 Part 2: General Conclusions and Reflections, Cambridge University Press
- Swope, Kenneth M. (2009), A Dragon's Head and a Serpent's Tail: Ming China and the First Great East Asian War, 1592–1598, University of Oklahoma Press
- Wood, W. W. (1830), Sketches of China
- Wagner, Donald B. (1996), Iron and Steel in Ancient China, E.J. Brill
- Wagner, Donald B. (2008), Science and Civilization in China Volume 5-11: Ferrous Metallurgy, Cambridge University Press
- Wright, David (2005), From War to Diplomatic Parity in Eleventh Century China, Brill
- Late Imperial Chinese Armies: 1520-1840 C.J. Peers, Illustrated by Christa Hook, Osprey Publishing «Men-at-arms», ISBN 1-85532-655-8
