= List of provinces and commanderies of the Han dynasty =

Commanderies of the Eastern Han dynasty in 219 AD

Local governments in the Han dynasty (202 BC – 220 AD) consisted of three levels of administrative divisions: provinces (cishibu 刺史部, or zhou), commanderies (jun) and counties (xian). The early Han dynasty inherited a two-tiered system of government composed of commanderies and counties from the Warring States (5th century BC – 221 BC) and the Qin dynasty (221 BC – 206 BC), while 13 provinces were created on top of the existing hierarchy in 106 BC.

In each province, the central government assigned an Inspector (cishi, 刺史) to audit the administration of commanderies and kingdoms, from 106 BC to 1 BC and from 42 AD to 188 AD. In other periods, the position was replaced by a Governor (mu, 牧, literally "shepherd"), a higher-ranked official. A commandery was under a Commandery Administrator (junshou, 郡守, before 148 BC) or a Grand Administrator (taishou, 太守, after 148 BC). A county was governed by a Magistrate (ling, 令, for larger counties) or a Chief (zhang, 長, for smaller counties), who were the lowest local officials directly appointed by the central government. A special type of county, known as march (dao, 道), was used to administer certain areas with "barbarian" populations, especially on the frontiers of the empire.

In early Han dynasty, chief followers and relatives of the emperor were granted kingdoms. However, independence of the kings gradually diminished. After the failed Rebellion of the Seven States, drastic measures were instated to limit the power of the kings. From 145 BC onward, the central government controlled the appointment of all important officials in the kingdoms. Larger kingdoms were divided, and eventually the government of a kingdom became identical to that of a commandery. For example, the Chancellor (xiang, 相) was equivalent to a Grand Administrator. Similarly, marquessates were administered in the same way as counties.

By the end of the Western Han dynasty, the empire had 103 kingdoms and commanderies, as well as 1,587 counties. The Eastern Han census in 140 AD documented 99 kingdoms and commanderies, and 1,179 counties.

== Provinces ==
Emperor Wu divided the empire into the capital region and 13 provinces. The capital region, although similar to a province in size, was not assigned an Inspector, but was instead inspected by the Colonel Director of Retainers (Sili xiaowei, 司隸校尉). The region was therefore often known as "Sili".

A final province, Yongzhou, was created in 194 AD. In 213, Cao Cao sought to restore the Nine Provinces as described in the ancient text Yu Gong, and decreed that Sili, Liangzhou, Bingzhou, Youzhou and Jiaozhou be abolished. However, because the empire had descended into civil war, these changes could only be carried out in the territories controlled by Cao Cao. The abolished provinces were all restored in 220.

During the Western Han dynasty, the Inspectors were agents of the central government, and did not permanently reside in the provinces. The Inspector/Governor was established as a post in the local government only in 35 AD.

Apart from the capital region, the provinces are:

Province		Extent
Yuzhou	豫州	S. and E. Henan, N. Anhui, N. Jiangsu, SW. Shandong
Jizhou	冀州	S. Hebei
Yanzhou	兗州	W. Shandong, NE. Henan
Qingzhou	青州	N. and E. Shandong, SE. Hebei
Xuzhou	徐州	N. Jiangsu, NE. Anhui, SE. Shandong
Jingzhou	荊州	S. Henan, Hubei, Hunan, parts of Guangdong and Guangxi
Yangzhou	揚州	S. Jiangsu, S. Anhui, Zhejiang, Fujian, parts of Henan and Hubei
Yizhou	益州	Sichuan, Chongqing, Yunnan, Guizhou, S. Shaanxi, parts of Hubei and Gansu
Liangzhou	涼州	Gansu, Ningxia, NE. Qinghai (Note: The western half of Liangzhou was made a separate province, Yongzhou, in 194 AD. In 213 AD, All of Liangzhou and the Guanzhong territories of the capital region were merged into Yongzhou. In 220 AD, however, eight commanderies in the west of the province were once again split off as a new Liangzhou province.)
Bingzhou	并州	Shanxi, parts of Shaanxi and Inner Mongolia
Shuofang (Note: Abandoned in 45 AD due to Xiongnu pressure. All remaining commanderies were transferred to Bingzhou.)	朔方	N. Shaanxi, Ordos and Hetao regions in Inner Mongolia
Youzhou	幽州	N. Hebei, Beijing, Tianjin, Liaoning, northern Korea
Jiaozhi (Note: Renamed to Jiaozhou (交州) in 203 AD)	交趾	Northern and central Vietnam, Guangxi, Guangdong, SE. Fujian
Yongzhou	雍州	Hexi Corridor

== Commanderies ==
Commandery		Seat		First established	Last dissolved	Population (2 AD census)	No. of counties (Book of Han)	Population (140 AD census)	No. of counties (Book of Later Han)	Province
Name	Chinese	Name	Chinese	First established	Last dissolved	Population (2 AD census)	No. of counties (Book of Han)	Population (140 AD census)	No. of counties (Book of Later Han)	Province
Jingzhao (Note: While usually listed alongside commanderies, Jingzhao, Zuopingyi, Youfufeng were not commanderies themselves. Instead, Jingzhao was governed by the Intendant of the Capital. Zuopingyi and Youfufeng were also titles of the officials that administer the two regions. The three regions in the Guanzhong Plain, collectively known as "Sanfu" (三輔), were briefly divided into regular commanderies (Weinan, Heshang and Zhongdi) in the first years of the Former Han. From 198 BC to 104 BC, they were overseen by the Clerk of the Capital (Neishi 內史). There were two Clerks of the Capital ("left", Zuo Neishi; and "right", You Neishi) from Emperor Wen's reign onward, who were in charge of the northern and southern halves of the region, respectively. Henan was administered in a similar way to Jingzhao during the Eastern Han period.)	京兆	Chang'an	長安	104 BC	–	682,468	12	285,574	10	Sili
Zuopingyi	左馮翊	Chang'an → Gaoling	長安 高陵	104 BC	–	917,822	24	145,195	13	Sili
Youfufeng	右扶風	Chang'an → Huaili	長安 槐里	104 BC	–	836,070	21	93,091	15	Sili
Weinan	渭南			206 BC	198 BC	–	–	–	–	–
Heshang	河上			206 BC	198 BC	–	–	–	–	–
Zhongdi	中地			205 BC	198 BC	–	–	–	–	–
Taichang (Note: A special commandery in charge of imperial mausoleums)	太常	Chang'an	長安	c. 145 BC	41 BC	–	–	–	–	Sili
Henan	河南	Luoyang	雒陽	4th century BC	–	1,740,279	22	1,010,827	21	Sili
Henei	河內	Huai	懷	Emperor Gao's reign	–	1,067,097	18	801,558	18	Sili
Hedong	河東	Anyi	安邑	3rd century BC	–	962,912	24	570,803	20	Sili
Hongnong	弘農	Hongnong	弘農	113 BC	–	475,954	11	199,113	9	Sili
Yingchuan	潁川	Yangdi	陽翟	230 BC	–	2,210,973	20	1,436,513	17	Yuzhou
Runan	汝南	Pingyu	平輿	Emperor Gao's reign	–	2,596,148	37	2,100,788	37	Yuzhou
Xiping	西平	Xiping	西平	82 AD	88 AD	–	–	–	–	Yuzhou
Yiyang	弋陽	Yiyang	弋陽	213 AD	–	–	–	–	–	Yuzhou
Dang/ Liang	碭 梁	Dang → Suiyang	碭 睢陽	225 BC	–	106,752	8	431,283	9	Yuzhou
Pei	沛	Xiang	相	Emperor Jing's reign	–	2,030,480	37	1,251,393 (Note: Corrected based on commentary in 曹金华 (2014). 后汉书稽疑. p. 1511.)	21	Yuzhou
Qiao	譙	Qiao	譙	213 AD	–	–	–	–	–	Yuzhou
Huaiyang/ Chen	淮陽 陳	Chen	陳	224 BC	–	981,423	9	547,572	9	Yanzhou → Yuzhou
Xue/ Lu	薛 魯	Lu	魯	224 BC	–	607,381	6	411,590	6	Yuzhou
Wei	魏	Ye	鄴	152 BC	–	909,655	18	695,660	15	Jizhou
Julu	鉅鹿	Julu → Yingtao	鉅鹿 廮陶	228 BC	–	827,177	20	602,096	15	Jizhou
Guangping → Pinggan	廣平 平干	Guangping	廣平	Emperor Wu's reign	82 AD (Note: Dissolved in 37 AD, reestablished in 60 AD)	198,558	16	–	–	Jizhou
Guangzong	廣宗			93 AD	93 AD	–	–	–	–	Jizhou
Hengshan/ Changshan	恆山 常山	Yuanshi	元氏	228 BC	–	677,956	18	631,184	13	Jizhou
Zhending	真定	Zhending	真定	113 BC	37 AD	178,616	4	–	–	Jizhou
Zhongshan	中山	Lunu	盧奴	154 BC	–	668,080	14	658,195	13	Jizhou
Boling	博陵	Boling	博陵	158 AD	–	–	–	–	–	Jizhou
Xindu/ Lecheng/ Anping	信都 樂成 安平	Xindu	信都	154 BC	–	304,384	17	655,118	13	Jizhou
Hejian	河間	Lecheng	樂成	Emperor Gao's reign	– (Note: Dissolved in 37 AD, reestablished in 90 AD)	187,662	4	634,421	11	Jizhou
Zhangwu	章武	Dongpingshu	東平舒	c. 213 AD	–	–	–	–	–	Jizhou
Qinghe/ Ganling	清河 甘陵	Qingyang → Ganling	清陽 甘陵	Emperor Gao's reign	–	875,422	14	760,418	17	Jizhou
Guangchuan	廣川	Guangchuan	廣川	107 AD	121 AD	–	–	–	–	Jizhou
Handan/ Zhao	邯鄲 趙	Handan	邯鄲	228 BC	–	349,952	4	188,381	5	Jizhou
Bohai	勃海	Fuyang → Nanpi	浮陽 南皮	165 BC	–	905,119	26	1,106,500	8	Youzhou → Jizhou
Jichuan/ Chenliu/ Jiyang	濟川 陳留 濟陽	Jiyang → Chenliu	濟陽 陳留	144 BC	–	1,509,050	17	869,433	17	Yanzhou
Dong	東	Puyang	濮陽	242 BC	–	1,659,028	22	603,393	15	Yanzhou
Jiyin/ Dingtao	濟陰 定陶	Dingtao	定陶	144 BC	–	1,386,278	9	657,554	11	Yanzhou
Chengyang	城陽	Ju → Dongwu	莒 東武	Emperor Gao's reign	– (Note: Dissolved in 37 AD, reestablished in 198 AD)	205,784	4	–	–	Yanzhou → Qingzhou
Jidong/ Dahe/ Dongping	濟東 大河 東平	Wuyan	無鹽	144 BC	–	607,976	7	448,270	7	Yanzhou
Rencheng	任城	Rencheng	任城	84 AD	–	–	–	194,156	3	Yanzhou
Taishan	泰山	Fenggao	奉高	122 BC	–	726,604	24	437,317	12	Yanzhou
Ying	嬴	Ying	嬴	Emperor Xian's reign	Unknown	–	–	–	–	Yanzhou
Jibei	濟北	Boyang → Lu	博陽 盧	Qin dynasty	–	–	–	235,897	5	Yanzhou
Shanyang/ Changyi	山陽 昌邑	Changyi	昌邑	144 BC	–	801,288	23	606,091	10	Yanzhou
Boyang/ Jinan	濟南	Boyang → Dongpingling	博陽 東平陵	201 BC	–	642,884	14	453,308	10	Qingzhou
Pingyuan	平原	Pingyuan	平原	Emperor Jing's reign	–	664,543	19	1,002,658	9	Qingzhou → Jizhou
Laoling	樂陵	Yanci	厭次	213 AD	–	–	–	–	–	Jizhou
Qiansheng/ Le'an	千乘 樂安	Qiansheng → Linji	千乘 臨濟	110 BC	–	490,720	15	424,075	9	Qingzhou
Linzi/ Qi	臨菑 齊	Linzi	臨淄	221 BC	–	554,444	12	491,765	6	Qingzhou
Beihai	北海	Yingling → Ju	營陵 勮	156 BC	–	593,159	26	853,604	18	Qingzhou
Zichuan	菑川	Ju	勮	164 BC	37 AD	227,031	3	–	–	Qingzhou
Jiaoxi/ Gaomi	膠西 高密	Gaomi	高密	201 BC	37 AD	205,784	4	–	–	Qingzhou
Jiaodong	膠東	Jimo	即墨	219 BC	37 AD	323,331	8	–	–	Qingzhou
Donglai	東萊	Ye → Huang	掖 黃	Emperor Jing's reign	–	502,693	17	484,393	13	Qingzhou
Changguang	長廣	Changguang	長廣	198 AD	Unknown	–	–	–	–	Qingzhou
Langya	琅邪	Langya → Dongwu → Kaiyang	琅邪 東武 開陽	221 BC	–	1,079,010	51	570,967	13	Xuzhou
Dongguan	東莞	Dongguan	東莞	198 AD	–	–	–	–	–	Xuzhou
Dong'an	東安			Emperor Xian's reign	Unknown	–	–	–	–	Xuzhou
Donghai	東海	Tan	郯	Qin dynasty	–	1,559,357	38	706,416	13	Xuzhou
Licheng	利城	Licheng	利城	198 AD	–	–	–	–	–	Xuzhou
Changlü	昌慮	Changlü	昌慮	198 AD	206 AD	–	–	–	–	Xuzhou
Pengcheng/ Chu	彭城 楚	Pengcheng	彭城	Qin dynasty	–	497,804	7	493,027	8	Xuzhou
Linhuai	臨淮	Xu	徐	117 BC	79 AD	1,237,764	29	–	–	Xuzhou
Xiapi	下邳	Xiapi	下邳	72 AD	–	–	–	611,083	17	Xuzhou
Dongcheng	東城			Emperor Xian's reign	Unknown	–	–	–	–	Xuzhou
Dongyang/ Guangling	東陽 廣陵	Guangling	廣陵	Emperor Gao's reign	–	140,722	4	410,190	11	Xuzhou
Sishui	泗水	Ling	淩	114 BC	37 AD	119,114	3	–	–	Xuzhou
Nanyang	南陽	Wan	宛	272 BC	–	1,942,051	36	2,439,618	37	Jingzhou
Zhangling	章陵	Zhangling	章陵	Emperor Xian's reign	–	–	–	–	–	Jingzhou
Nanxiang	南鄉	Nanxiang	南鄉	Emperor Xian's reign	–	–	–	–	–	Jingzhou
Nan/ Linjiang/ Jiangling	南 臨江 江陵	Jiangling	江陵	278 BC	–	718,540	18	747,604	17	Jingzhou
Xiangyang	襄陽	Xiangyang	襄陽	208 AD	–	–	–	–	–	Jingzhou
Linjiang/ Yidu	臨江 宜都	Yidu	宜都	208 AD	–	–	–	–	–	Jingzhou
Hengshan	衡山	Zhu	邾	Qin dynasty	121 BC	–	–	–	–	–
Jiangxia	江夏	Xiling → Shiyang/ Shaxian	西陵 石陽 沙羨	121 BC	–	219,218	14	265,464	14	Jingzhou
Qichun	蘄春	Qichun	蘄春	208 AD	–	–	–	–	–	Yangzhou
Xiling	西陵	Yangxin	陽新	214 AD	Unknown	–	–	–	–	Jingzhou
Wuchang	武昌	Wuchang	武昌	220 AD	–	–	–	–	–	Jingzhou
Lingling	零陵	Lingling → Quanling	零陵 泉陵	111 BC	–	139,378	10	1,001,578	10	Jingzhou
Guiyang	桂陽	Chen	郴	Emperor Gao's reign	–	156,488	11	501,403	11	Jingzhou
Wuling	武陵	Suo → Linyuan	索 臨沅	4th century BC	–	185,758	13	250,913	12	Jingzhou
Changsha	長沙	Linxiang	臨湘	221 BC	–	235,823	13	1,059,372	12	Jingzhou
Hanchang	漢昌	Hanchang	漢昌	210 AD	Unknown	–	–	–	–	Jingzhou
Jiujiang/ Huainan	九江 淮南	Shouchun	壽春	223 BC	–	780,525	15	432,426	14	Yangzhou
Fuling	阜陵	Fuling	阜陵	73 AD	206 AD	–	–	–	–	Yangzhou
Zhang/ Danyang	鄣 丹陽	Guzhang → Wanling → Jianye	故鄣 宛陵 建業	Qin dynasty	–	405,171	17	630,545	16	Yangzhou
Xindu	新都	Shixin	始新	208 AD	–	–	–	–	–	Yangzhou
Linchuan	臨川			Emperor Xian's reign	Unknown	–	–	–	–	Yangzhou
Lujiang	廬江	Poyang	鄱陽	219 BC	121 BC	–	–	–	–	–
Lujiang (Note: A separate commandery from the first Lujiang Commandery)	廬江	Shu → Wan	舒 皖	121 BC	–	457,333	12	424,683	14	Yangzhou
Lu'an	六安	Lu	六	121 BC	37 AD	178,616	5	–	–	Yangzhou
Kuaiji	會稽	Wu → Shanyin	吳 山陰	222 BC	–	1,032,604	26	481,196	14	Yangzhou
Wu	吳	Wu	吳	129 AD	–	–	–	700,782	13	Yangzhou
Yuzhang	豫章	Nanchang	南昌	202 BC	–	351,965	18	1,668,906	21	Yangzhou
Luling	廬陵	Xichang	西昌	195 AD	–	–	–	–	–	Yangzhou
Pengze	彭澤			208 AD	Unknown	–	–	–	–	Yangzhou
Poyang	鄱陽	Poyang	鄱陽	210 AD	–	–	–	–	–	Yangzhou
Hanzhong/ Hanning	漢中 漢寧	Xicheng → Nanzheng	西城 南鄭	312 BC	–	300,614	12	267,402	9	Yizhou
Xicheng	西城	Xicheng	西城	215 AD	–	–	–	–	–	Jingzhou
Shangyong	上庸	Shangyong	上庸	215 AD	–	–	–	–	–	Jingzhou
Fangling	房陵	Fangling	房陵	215 – 219 AD	–	–	–	–	–	Jingzhou
Ba/ Yongning	巴 永寧	Jiangzhou	江州	316 BC	–	708,148	11	1,086,049	14	Yizhou
Badong Dependent States (Note: Dependent States were institutions that governed non-Han peoples in the empire. Their chief officials were known as Chief Commandants (duwei, 都尉). Most Dependent States were subordinate to commanderies. However, six important Dependent States were elevated to full commandery status during Emperor An's reign.)	巴東屬國	Fuling	涪陵	201 AD	–	–	–	–	–	Yizhou
Ba/ Baxi	巴 巴西	Anhan → Langzhong	安漢 閬中	195 AD	–	–	–	–	–	Yizhou
Dangqu	宕渠	Dangqu	宕渠	218 AD	–	–	–	–	–	Yizhou
Guling/ Badong	固陵 巴東	Yufu	魚復	195 AD	–	–	–	–	–	Yizhou
Guanghan	廣漢	Zitong → Luo	梓潼 雒	201 BC	–	662,249	13	509,438	11	Yizhou
Zitong	梓潼	Zitong	梓潼	217 AD	–	–	–	–	–	Yizhou
Guanghan Dependent States/ Yinping	廣漢屬國 陰平	Yinping	陰平	108 AD	–	–	–	205,652	3	Yizhou
Shu	蜀	Chengdu	成都	316 BC	–	1,245,929	15	1,350,476	11	Yizhou
Shu Commandery Dependent States/ Hanjia	蜀郡屬國 漢嘉	Hanjia	漢嘉	123 AD	–	–	–	475,629	4	Yizhou
Shenli	沈黎	Zuodu	筰都	111 BC	97 BC	–	–	–	–	Yizhou
Yuesui	越巂	Qiongdu	邛都	111 BC	–	408,405	15	623,418	11	Yizhou
Wudu	武都	Wudu → Xiabian	武都 下辯	111 BC	–	235,560	9	81,728	7	Yizhou → Liangzhou
Wenshan	汶山	Wenjiang	汶江	111 BC	–	–	–	–	–	Yizhou
Qianwei	犍為	Bi → Bodao → Wuyang	鄨 僰道 武陽	135 BC	–	489,486	12	411,378	9	Yizhou
Jiangyang	江陽	Jiangyang	江陽	213 AD	–	–	–	–	–	Yizhou
Qianwei Dependent States/ Zhuti	犍為屬國 朱提	Zhuti	朱提	107 AD	–	–	–	37,187	2	Yizhou
Zangke	牂牁	Gujulan	故且蘭	111 BC	–	153,360	17	267,253	16	Yizhou
Yizhou	益州	Dianchi	滇池	109 BC	–	580,463	24	110,802	17	Yizhou
Yongchang	永昌	Suitang → Buwei	巂唐 不韋	69 AD	–	–	–	1,897,344 (Note: Disputed)	8	Yizhou
Longxi	隴西	Didao → Xiangwu → Didao	狄道 襄武 狄道	279 BC	–	236,824	11	29,637	11	Liangzhou
Jincheng	金城	Jincheng → Yunwu	金城 允吾	81 BC	–	149,648	13	18,947	10	Liangzhou
Xiping	西平	Xidu	西都	Emperor Xian's reign	–	–	–	–	–	Liangzhou
Tianshui/ Hanyang	天水 漢陽	Pingxiang → Ji	平襄 冀	114 BC	–	261,348	16	130,138	13	Liangzhou
Nan'an	南安	Huandao	豲道	188 AD	214 AD	–	–	–	–	Liangzhou
Yongyang	永陽	Shanggui	上邽	193 AD	214 AD	–	–	–	–	Liangzhou
Anding	安定	Gaoping → Meiyang → Linjing	高平 美陽 臨涇	114 BC	–	143,294	21	29,060	8	Liangzhou
Xinping	新平	Qi	漆	194 AD	–	–	–	–	–	Liangzhou
Jiuquan	酒泉	Lufu	祿福	Emperor Wu's reign	–	76,726	9	12,706	9	Liangzhou → Yongzhou
Zhangye	張掖	Lude	觻得	Emperor Wu's reign	–	88,731	10	26,040	8	Liangzhou → Yongzhou
Zhangye Dependent States	張掖屬國			Emperor An's reign	–	–	–	16,952	5	Liangzhou → Yongzhou
Zhangye Juyan Dependent States/ Xihai	張掖居延屬國 西海	Juyan	居延	Emperor An's reign	–	–	–	4,733	1	Liangzhou → Yongzhou
Xi	西	Rile	日勒	195 AD	–	–	–	–	–	Yongzhou
Dunhuang	敦煌	Dunhuang	敦煌	Emperor Wu's reign	–	38,335	6	29,170	6	Liangzhou → Yongzhou
Wuwei	武威	Guzang	姑臧	Emperor Xuan or Emperor Yuan's reign	–	76,419	10	34,226	14	Liangzhou → Yongzhou
Shangdang	上黨	Zhangzi	長子	5th century BC	–	337,766	14	127,403	13	Bingzhou
Leping	樂平	Zhan	沾	c. 215 AD	–	–	–	–	–	Bingzhou
Taiyuan	太原	Jinyang	晉陽	247 BC	–	680,488	21	200,124	16	Bingzhou
Xinxing	新興	Jiuyuan	九原	215 AD	–	–	–	–	–	Bingzhou
Yanmen	雁門	Shanwu → Yinguan	善無 陰館	c. 300 BC	–	293,454	14	31,862	14	Bingzhou
Dai	代	Sanggan → Dai → Gaoliu	桑乾 代 高柳	c. 300 BC	–	278,754	18	20,123	11	Bingzhou → Youzhou
Yunzhong	雲中	Yunzhong	雲中	c. 300 BC	215 AD	173,270	11	26,430	11	Bingzhou
Dingxiang	定襄	Chengle	成樂	196 BC	215 AD	163,144	12	13,571	5	Bingzhou
Wuyuan	五原	Jiuyuan	九原	127 BC	215 AD	231,328	16	22,957	10	Shuofang → Bingzhou
Shuofang	朔方	Shuofang → Linrong → Wuyuan	朔方 臨戎 五原	127 BC	215 AD	136,628	10	7,843	6	Shuofang → Bingzhou
Shang	上	Fushi → Ya → Fushi → Xiayang	膚施 衙 膚施 夏陽	c. 5th century BC	215 AD	606,658	23	28,599	10	Shuofang → Bingzhou
Xihe	西河	Pingding → Lishi	平定 離石	125 BC	Emperor Ling's reign	698,836	36	20,838	13	Shuofang → Bingzhou
Beidi	北地	Maling → Fuping → Chiyang → Fuping → Duiyu	馬領 富平 池陽 富平 祋祤	271 BC	–	210,688	19	18,637	6	Shuofang → Liangzhou
Zhuo	涿	Zhuo	涿	117 BC	–	782,764	29	633,754	7	Youzhou
Shanggu	上谷	Juyang	沮陽	283 BC	–	117,762	15	51,204	8	Youzhou
Guangyang	廣陽	Ji	薊	222 BC	– (Note: Dissolved in 37 AD, reestablished in 96 AD)	70,658	4	280,600	5	Youzhou
Yuyang	漁陽	Yuyang	漁陽	283 BC	–	264,116	12	435,740	9	Youzhou
Youbeiping	右北平	Wuzhong → Pinggang → Tuyin	無終 平剛 土垠	c. 3rd century BC	–	320,780	16	53,475	4	Youzhou
Liaoxi	遼西	Yangle	陽樂	c. 3rd century BC	–	352,325	14	81,714	5	Youzhou
Liaodong	遼東	Xiangping	襄平	c. 3rd century BC	–	272,539	18	Unknown	11	Youzhou
Liaodong Dependent States	遼東屬國	Changli	昌黎	Emperor An's reign	–	–	–	Unknown	6	Youzhou
Xuantu (Hyŏnto)	玄菟	Fuzu (Pucho) → Gaogouli (Koguryŏ)	夫租 高句驪	108 BC	–	221,845	3	43,163	6	Youzhou
Lelang (Rakrang)	樂浪	Chaoxian (Chosŏn)	朝鮮	108 BC	–	406,748	25	257,050	18	Youzhou
Lintun (Imtun)	臨屯	Dongyi (Tongni)	東暆	108 BC	82 BC	–	–	–	–	Youzhou
Zhenfan (Chinpŏn)	真番	Shou (Sap)	霅	108 BC	82 BC	–	–	–	–	Youzhou
Canghai (Ch'anghae)	蒼海			128 BC	126 BC	–	–	–	–	Youzhou
Daifang (Taepang)	帶方	Daifang (Taepang)	帶方	c. 213 AD	–	–	–	–	–	Youzhou
Xiang	象	Linchen	臨塵	214 BC	76 BC	–	–	–	–	Yizhou
Nanhai	南海	Panyu	番禺	214 BC	–	94,253	6	250,282	7	Jiaozhi
Cangwu	蒼梧	Guangxin	廣信	111 BC	–	146,160	10	466,975	11	Jiaozhi
Yulin	鬱林	Bushan	布山	111 BC	–	71,162	12	Unknown	11	Jiaozhi
Hepu	合浦	Xuwen → Hepu	徐聞 合浦	111 BC	–	78,980	5	86,617	5	Jiaozhi
Gaoxing/ Gaoliang	高興 高涼	Gaoliang → Siping	高涼 思平	Emperor Huan's reign	– (Note: Dissolved during Emperor Ling's reign, reestablished in 220 AD)	–	–	–	–	Jiaozhi
Jiaozhi (Giao Chỉ)	交趾	Leilou (Luy Lâu) → Longbian (Long Biên)	羸𨻻 龍編	204 BC	–	746,237	10	Unknown	12	Jiaozhi
Jiuzhen (Cửu Chân)	九真	Xupu (Tư Phố)	胥浦	204 BC	–	166,013	7	209,894	5	Jiaozhi
Rinan (Nhật Nam)	日南	Zhuwu (Chu Ngô) → Xiquan (Tây Quyển)	朱吾 西捲	111 BC	–	69,485	5	100,676	5	Jiaozhi
Zhuya	珠崖	Shendu	瞫都	110 BC	46 BC	–	–	–	–	Jiaozhi
Dan'er	儋耳	Dan'er	儋耳	110 BC	46 BC	–	–	–	–	Jiaozhi

== See also ==
- Government of the Han dynasty
- History of the administrative divisions of China before 1912
