= Kings of the Han dynasty =

Imperial Chinese vassals

The Han dynasty in 195 BC and its vassal kingdoms

The Han were a dynasty of rulers governing China from roughly 202 BC to 220 AD.

After Liu Bang defeated his rival Xiang Yu in 202 BC and proclaimed himself emperor of the Han dynasty, he followed the practice of Xiang Yu and enfeoffed many generals, noblemen, and imperial relatives as kings (Chinese: 王; pinyin: wáng), the same title borne by the sovereigns of the Shang and Zhou dynasties and by the rulers of the Warring States. Each king had his own semi-autonomous kingdom. This was a departure from the policy of the Qin dynasty, which divided China into commanderies governed by non-hereditary governors.

The kings were divided into two groups: yìxìng wáng, literally "kings of different surnames", and tóngxìng wáng, literally "kings of the same surname", i.e., the imperial surname Liu. All of the initial kings were yixing wang, with many tongxing wang being created on former territories of removed yixing wang. The yixing wang represented an obvious threat to the Han empire, and Liu Bang and his successors suppressed them as quickly as was practical: they had disappeared by 157 BC. The tongxing wang were originally left to their own devices but, after the Rebellion of the Seven States in 154 BC, their independence was curtailed. Eventually they lost most of their autonomy. For this reason, the title is also translated as "prince" when referring to later kings of the dynasty, to reflect both their link to the ruling house and the vestigial nature of the former vassal kingdoms.

== Yixing Kingdoms ==
The kings from other dynasties (Chinese: 異姓王; pinyin: yìxìng wáng) were mostly remnants of the rebellion against the Qin dynasty. Following the Dazexiang Uprising, many noblemen rose in rebellion. Heirs, pretenders, and warlords called themselves "kings" and claimed sovereignty as continuations of the six states previously suppressed by Qin. Among these, Chu was the most powerful. However, its rightful ruler Huai II was assassinated on the orders of the warlord Xiang Yu and the 18 Kingdoms Xiang had formed rose in rebellion against him. Liu Bang, king of Han, ultimately defeated Chu and established the new Han dynasty. The kings who had sided with him were then permitted to maintain their titles and lands. A few other kingdoms were also formed by Liu Bang for generals and favorites.

Although nominally under the rule of the Han, these kings were de facto independent and held considerable power within their territories, which could span several prefectures. As these kingdoms proved unruly, Liu Bang gradually subdued them through conspiracies, wars, and political maneuvering. Many were thus deposed and their kingdoms annexed by Han. As he was dying, the emperor ordered his ministers to swear an oath that only members of the royal house of Liu would be created as kings thenceforth. This injunction was violated by his widow, Empress Dowager Lü, who established several kingdoms with her own relatives as kings. They were destroyed after her death. The last king of the Western Han was Wu Zhu, King Jing of Changsha, who died without an heir in 157 BC. After that, there were no kings outside the royal clan until the end of the Han dynasty, when Cao Cao styled himself King of Wei in AD 216.

=== Original kingdoms ===
- Yan – Zang Tu (independent rebel who surrendered to Han, rebelled in 202 BC but was defeated and replaced by Lu Wan, a Han general, who also plotted rebellion and was replaced in 195 BC by Liu Jian, son of Gaozu)
- Chu – Han Xin (general and commander-in-chief of the imperial Han army, rewarded with kingship, demoted to marquis in 201 BC and replaced by Liu Jiao, brother of Gaozu)
- Zhao – Zhang Ao (son of independent rebel who surrendered to Han, demoted to marquis in 199 BC and replaced by Liu Ruyi, son of Gaozu)
- Liang – Peng Yue (Han general rewarded with kingship, demoted to commoner in 196 BC and replaced by Liu Ruyi, son of Gaozu)
- Hán – Han Xin (Xin of Han) (Han general descended from Hán nobility promised kingship by Gaozu, rebelled in 200 BC and allied himself with the Xiongnu)
- Changsha – Wu Rui (independent rebel, died 202 BC)
- Huainan – Ying Bu (Chu general who defected to Han, rebelled in 197 BC but was defeated and replaced by Liu Chang, son of Gaozu)

=== Established by Liu Bang ===
- Dai

=== Established by the Empress Dowager Lü ===
- Lu
- Huaiyang
- Changshan
- Lü

== Tongxing Kingdoms ==
The "kings of the same surname" (Chinese: 同姓王; pinyin: tóngxìng wáng) were members of the House of Liu, sons, brothers, or descendants of the Han emperors. The Han emperors initially felt that creating these kingdoms would strengthen the house, particularly against the other kings. However, these princes became even more dangerous, as they were eligible to succeed the throne.

Several rebellions were attempted by these powerful princes during the reigns of the emperors Jing and Wu. After the Rebellion of the Seven Princes, Emperor Wu reformed the principalities, reducing them to single prefectures and granting superior authority to prime ministers appointed by the central government. The institution continued until the very end of the dynasty, however.

=== Established by Liu Bang ===
- Prince of Chu
- Prince of Dai (Liu Zhong, Liu Ruyi and Liu Heng)
- Prince of Qi
- Prince of Jing
- Prince of Huainan
- Prince of Zhao
- Prince of Yan
- Prince of Wu

=== Established by Emperor Wen ===
- Prince of Liang
- Prince of Chengyang
- Prince of Jibei
- Prince of Zichuan
- Prince of Jinan
- Prince of Jiaodong
- Prince of Jiaoxi
- Prince of Hengshan
- Prince of Lujiang
- Prince of Hejian

=== Established by Emperor Jing ===
- Prince of Linjiang
- Prince of Jiangdu
- Prince of Changsha
- Prince of Zhongshan
- Prince of Guangchuan
- Prince of Qinghe
- Prince of Changshan
- Prince of Jichuan
- Prince of Jidong
- Prince of Shanyang
- Prince of Jiyin

=== Established by Emperor Wu ===
- Prince of Guangling
- Prince of Changyi
- Prince of Lu'an
- Prince of Zhending
- Prince of Sishui
- Prince of Pinggan

=== Established by Emperor Xuan ===
- Prince of Huaiyang
- Prince of Dongping
- Prince of Gaomi

=== Established by Emperor Yuan ===
- Prince of Dingtao

=== Established by Emperor Cheng ===
- Prince of Guangde

=== Established by Emperor Ai ===
- Prince of Guangping

=== Established by Emperor Ping ===
- Prince of Guangshi
- Prince of Guangzong

== Crown Prince ==
The Crown Prince in the Han dynasty was the heir apparent to the throne. The Crown Prince was normally the eldest son of the Emperor and the Empress, but not always. The power to nominate the Crown Prince lay with the throne, although the Emperor generally had to obtain the advice or consent of his high ministers. The Crown Prince would not be given a princedom but instead lived with the Emperor in the capital. When a prince became heir apparent, his principality merged with the realm and became extinct. The Crown Prince could be dismissed and this did indeed happen several times in the Han dynasty.

=== List of Crown Princes ===
- Crown Prince Ying, son of Emperor Gaozu of Han, later Emperor Hui
- Crown Prince Qi, son of Emperor Wen of Han, later Emperor Jing
- Crown Prince Rong, son of Emperor Jing of Han, later demoted to Prince of Linjiang
- Crown Prince Che, son of Emperor Jing of Han, originally Prince of Jiaodong, later Emperor Wu
- Crown Prince Li, son of Emperor Wu of Han, rebelled and killed
- Crown Prince Fuling, son of Emperor Wu of Han, later Emperor Zhao
- Crown Prince Shi, son of Emperor Xuan of Han, later Emperor Yuan
- Crown Prince Ao, son of Emperor Yuan of Han, later Emperor Cheng
- Crown Prince Xin, grandson of Emperor Yuan of Han, originally Prince of Dingtao, adopted by Emperor Cheng of Han and later Emperor Ai

== See also ==
- History of the Han dynasty
- Chinese nobility
- Princes of the Ming dynasty
- Ancient Chinese states
- Eighteen Kingdoms
- Fengjian
