= Qingzhou (ancient China) =

Ancient province of China

- A conjectural reconstruction of the Nine Provinces of ancient Chinese geography
- Chinese: 青州 靑州
- Hanyu Pinyin: Qīngzhōu
- Literal meaning: Azure Province
Transcriptions
Standard Mandarin
- Hanyu Pinyin: Qīngzhōu

Qingzhou or Qing Province was one of the Nine Provinces of ancient China dating back to c. 2070 BCE that later became one of the thirteen provinces of the Han dynasty (206 BCE–220 CE). The Nine Provinces were first described in the Tribute of Yu chapter of the Book of Documents, with Qingzhou lying to the east of Yuzhou and north of Yangzhou. Qingzhou's primary territory included most of modern Shandong province except the southwest corner.

== History ==
=== Ancient times ===
The territory takes its name from the Yu Gong wherein Yu the Great wrote: "Between the sea and Mount Tai there is only Qingzhou". (Note: Chinese: 海岱惟青州, Hǎi Dài wéi Qīngzhōu.) In around 5,000 BCE the area was the cradle of Dongyi culture. During the Xia and Shang dynasties, it was home to the Shuangjiu (爽鸠, Shuǎngjīu), Jize (季则, Jìzé), and Pangboling (逄伯陵, Pángbólíng) clans and the state of Pugu.

=== Zhou dynasty ===
Following the Duke of Zhou's c. 1040 BCE successful campaign against the Dongyi states allied with the revolting Three Guards and the rebellious Shang prince Wu Geng, the captured territory of Pugu was granted to Jiang Ziya as the marchland of Qi.

=== Han dynasty ===
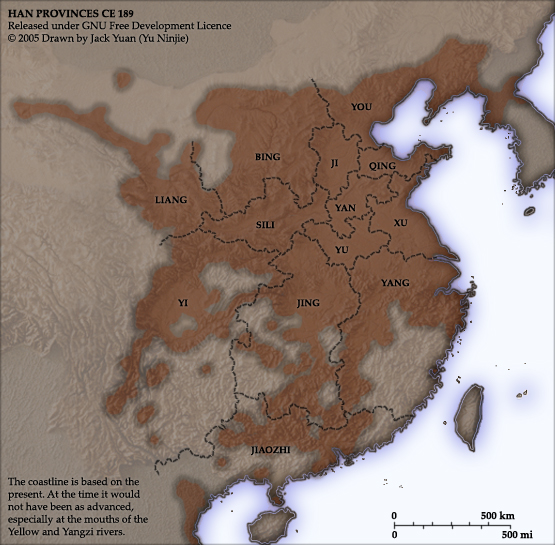
Chinese provinces in the late Eastern Han dynasty period, 189 CE.

In 106 BCE, Emperor Wu formally divided the Han Empire into 13 provinces and appointed a Regional Coordinator (Chinese: 刺史; pinyin: cìshǐ; also translated as Inspector) in Qingzhou. With the coming of the Eastern Han dynasty in 25 CE, the seat of a local administration moved from Qingzhou to the former Qi capital of Linzi (present-day Linzi District, Zibo, Shandong). In Eastern Han, Qing Province consisted of 5 commanderies, namely Pingyuan, Jinan, Beihai, Qiansheng, Donglai, and the kingdom/principality of Qi.

=== Tang dynasty ===
During the Tang dynasty (618–907), Qingzhou held jurisdiction over the seven counties of Yidu (益都), Beihai (北海), Linqu (临朐), Linzi (临淄), Qiancheng (千乘), Bochang (博昌) and Shouguang (寿光) with the administrative centre based in Yidu County.

=== Northern Song dynasty ===
The administrative centre of Qingzhou remained in Yidu County during the Northern Song dynasty (960–1127) with the number of counties reduced to six by the removal of Beihai County.
