= King of Wu =

Royal Title in Ancient China

- Traditional Chinese: 吳王
- Simplified Chinese: 吴王
- Literal meaning: King of Wu
Transcriptions
Standard Mandarin
- Hanyu Pinyin: Wúwáng
- Wade–Giles: Wu Wang

The King of Wu or Prince of Wu was a title referring to Chinese rulers of the area originally controlled by the Gou Wu tribes around Wuxi on the lower Yangtze, generally known as the Wu region. The title wang is written identically in Chinese, but it is common in English to distinguish between the scions of the imperial dynasties (translated "prince") and the dynasties of independent lords (translated "king").

== History ==
According to traditional Chinese historians, the title was first used by two refugee princes from Zhou who settled among the barbarian Wu. Their state of Wu had its capital first at Meili (traditionally held to be Meicun in modern Wuxi), then at Gusu (within modern Suzhou) and Helu City (present-day Suzhou). It was established independently but became a vassal to the Zhou dynasty after its conquest of the Shang dynasty. It became independent again during the Spring and Autumn period, but was annexed by the Yue state in 473 BC.

The title was somewhat infelicitous for the early Kings of the Han dynasty, who were quite autonomous and powerful before being reined in after an unsuccessful revolt in 154 BC. Therefore, the early princes are sometimes counted as "kings" as well. After the rebellion, the Wuyue region was divided up among different princes and the title was abolished until it was recreated during the Three Kingdoms era when Cao Cao recommended Sun Ce to be Marquis of Wu in 197. Sun Quan was created as King of Wu in 220 as a vassal ruler of Cao Wei. He later declared himself an independent king in 222 and proclaimed as emperor of the Eastern Wu in 229.

The Prince of Wu title was recreated during the Tang dynasty for 14th son of Emperor Gaozu, Li Yuangui. Li Ke was created as Prince of Wu in 636. The title was suspended in 653 when Li Ke ordered to commit suicide. He was found innocent in 705, and his son Li Kun was posthumously honored as Prince of Wu. The title remained suspended until near the end of Tang dynasty, Yang Xingmi was created Prince of Wu in 902, and his successor kept the Wu title even after end of Tang in 907. They remained independent as Southern Wu as King of Wu until Yang Pu declared himself an emperor.

During the Red Turban Rebellion, Zhu Yuanzhang declared himself King of Wu during the late phases of against the Yuan, just prior to his establishment of the Ming dynasty. His fifth son, Zhu Su, received the title as Prince of Wu after he became emperor in 1370. The title was vacated in 1378, after Zhu Su's title changed to Prince of Zhou. In 1399, Zhu Yuntong was recreated as Prince of Wu, but he was strip of the title after Jianwen Emperor was deposed by Yongle Emperor due to his relationship. The title became extinct since then.

== Titleholders ==
=== Wu state ===
- Shoumeng (585–561 BC)
- Zhufan (560–548 BC)
- Yuji (547–544 BC)
- Yumei (543–527 BC)
- Liao (526–515 BC)
- Helü (515–496 BC), cousin, rose to power via assassination, employed Sun Tzu
- Fuchai (495–473 BC)

=== Western Han dynasty ===
- Liu Pi (195–154 BC) led the Rebellion of the Seven States

=== Eastern Wu dynasty ===
- Sun Quan (220–229), vassal king of Cao Wei between 220 and 222, and independent afterward.

=== Tang dynasty ===
- Li Yuangui (625–636), 14th son of Emperor Gaozu, later Prince of Huo.
- Li Ke (636–653), 3rd son of Emperor Taizong, also a crown prince, famed for rebellion and was ordered to commit suicide.
- Yang Xingmi (852–905), created in 902 near the end of Tang dynasty, his successor later found the Southern Wu kingdom.

=== Yang Wu dynasty ===
- Yang Wo (886–908), eldest son of Yang Xingmi.
- Yang Longyan (897–920), second son of Yang Xingmi.
- Yang Pu (900–938), fourth son of Yang Xingmi, declared himself emperor.

=== Zhou/Wu kingdom ===
- Zhang Shicheng (1363–1367)

=== Ming dynasty ===
- Zhu Yuanzhang (1364–1368)
- Zhu Su (1361–1425), 5th son of Hongwu Emperor, created as Prince of Wu in 1370 and changed to Prince of Zhou in 1378.
- Zhu Yuntong (1378–1402), 3rd son of Zhu Biao, grandson of Hongwu Emperor, brother of Jianwen Emperor, created as Prince of Wu in 1399.

== See also ==
- Wang, as a title
- Wu Kingdom (Han dynasty)
- Prince of Huainan
- Wu
- Eastern Wu
