= Dou Ying =

Western Han dynasty Chinese politician

Dou Ying (? – 130 BC) was a politician of the Western Han dynasty. He was the son of a cousin of Empress Dou, the wife of Emperor Wen of Han. He was granted the title of Marquis of Weiqi for his military achievements during the Rebellion of the Seven States. Later, due to a feud with Tian Fen, he was executed for "forging an imperial edict."

== Life ==
=== Emperor Wen's reign ===
During the reign of Emperor Wen of Han, Dou Ying served as counsellor to Liu Pi, Prince of Wu, but later resigned due to ill health.

=== Emperor Jing's reign ===
When Emperor Jing came to the throne, Dou Ying was made steward of the empress and the heir apparent. Liu Wu, the Prince of Liang and brother of Emperor Jing visited the royal court and was given a banquet. at the banquet Emperor Jing while drunk remarked that once he died he would hand over the empire to Liu Wu. Empress Dowager Dou was delighted to hear this as Liu Wu was her favourite son, however Dou Ying was quick to intervene, explaining that it is law that the empire must pass from father to son, and dissuaded Emperor Jing from the idea. Because of the ordeal, Empress Dowager Dou came to hate Dou Ying, while he in turn despised his post as steward and resigned on ill health. Empress Dowager Dou then excommunicated him from the royal family.

In third year of Emperor Jing's reign (141 BC), the kings of Wu and Chu revolted. Unable to find any able leaders among the imperial court, Dou Ying was made general in chief, despite his wishes. After the war, Dou Ying was made Marquis of Weiqi.

A year later, Emperor Jing appointed Dou Ying as the tutor for his son, Crown Prince Li. However he was later deposed of his title as Crown Prince, a decision which Dou Ying unsuccessfully protested against. After this, Dou Ying retired to Lantian in the foothills of the southern mountains, but was successfully persuaded to come back to the imperial court by Kao Sui.

=== Emperor Wu's reign ===
Upon ascending the throne, Emperor Wu appointed Dou Ying as Counsellor-in-chief and Tian Fen as Defender-in-chief, both of whom were advocates for Confucian teachings, which attracted the hatred of Empress Dowager Dou, an adherent of the Huang–Lao faith. She later forced both of them to retire from their positions.

In the sixth year of Emperor Wu's reign (135 BC), Empress Dowager Dou died, and Dou Ying had become more estranged from the emperor. Tian Fen, however, rose to prominence, and became Counsellor-in-chief. Many scholars gradually distanced themselves from Dou Ying and aligned themselves with Tian Fen.

Four years later (131 BC), Dou Ying's close friend Guan Fu was arrested and imprisoned by Tian Fen because he spoke rudely to Tian Fen at a banquet. He was sentenced to death. Dou Ying tried his best to rescue Guan Fu and argued with Tian Fen about the matter at court. However, due to pressure from Empress Dowager Wang (The sister of Tian Fen), Guan Fu was still sentenced to death along with his entire family, and Dou Ying was impeached and imprisoned for his defense of Guan Fu. However, Dou Ying claimed that at the end of Emperor Jing's reign, he had received an imperial edict that stated, "If you ever find yourself in any difficulty, you should appeal your case directly to the throne." Dou Ying then requested his nephew to request and audience with the emperor on his behalf. However, the chief secretary found no copy of the imperial edict that Dou Ying had received in the palace. Dou Ying was accused of having forged an imperial edict, and was sentenced to death. A year later, Guan Fu was executed, and once the news reached Dou Ying, he became angry and intended to starve himself to death. Though he was later told that the emperor had no intention of executing him, so he resumed eating again. However, Tian Fen had spread rumors that Dou Ying had been speaking evilly of the emperor. As a result, Dou Ying was publicly executed at the marketplace.
