= Liu Pi =

Liu Pi may refer to:

- Liu Pi, Prince of Wu (劉濞; 216–154 BC), leader of the Rebellion of the Seven States in the Western Han dynasty
- Liu Pi (劉辟; died 201), a leader of the Yellow Turban Rebellion in the Eastern Han dynasty
- Liu Pi (official) (劉闢; died 806), an official during the Tang dynasty
