= Prince of Jinan =

Prince of Jinan may refer to:

- Princes of Jinan Commandery during the Han dynasty
  - Liu Piguang (died 154 BC)
- Emperor Fei of Northern Qi (545–561), known as the Prince of Jinan after his deposition
- Grand Prince of Jinan (1354–1394), Taejo of Joseon's son
