= 日南 =

日南, meaning "sunny south; the sun's southern side; the south of the sun", may refer to:

- Rinan, an ancient name for a region in Vietnam, the southernmost territory controlled by the Han Dynasty
- One of the following places in Japan:
  - Nichinan, Miyazaki
  - Nichinan, Tottori
- Rinan railway station, in Taiwan
- Hinami, a Japanese surname notable person is Kyoko Hinami, Japanese gravure idol and actress

== See also ==
- The dictionary definition of 日 at Wiktionary
- The dictionary definition of 南 at Wiktionary
