= Donglai Commandery =

Historic commandery of China

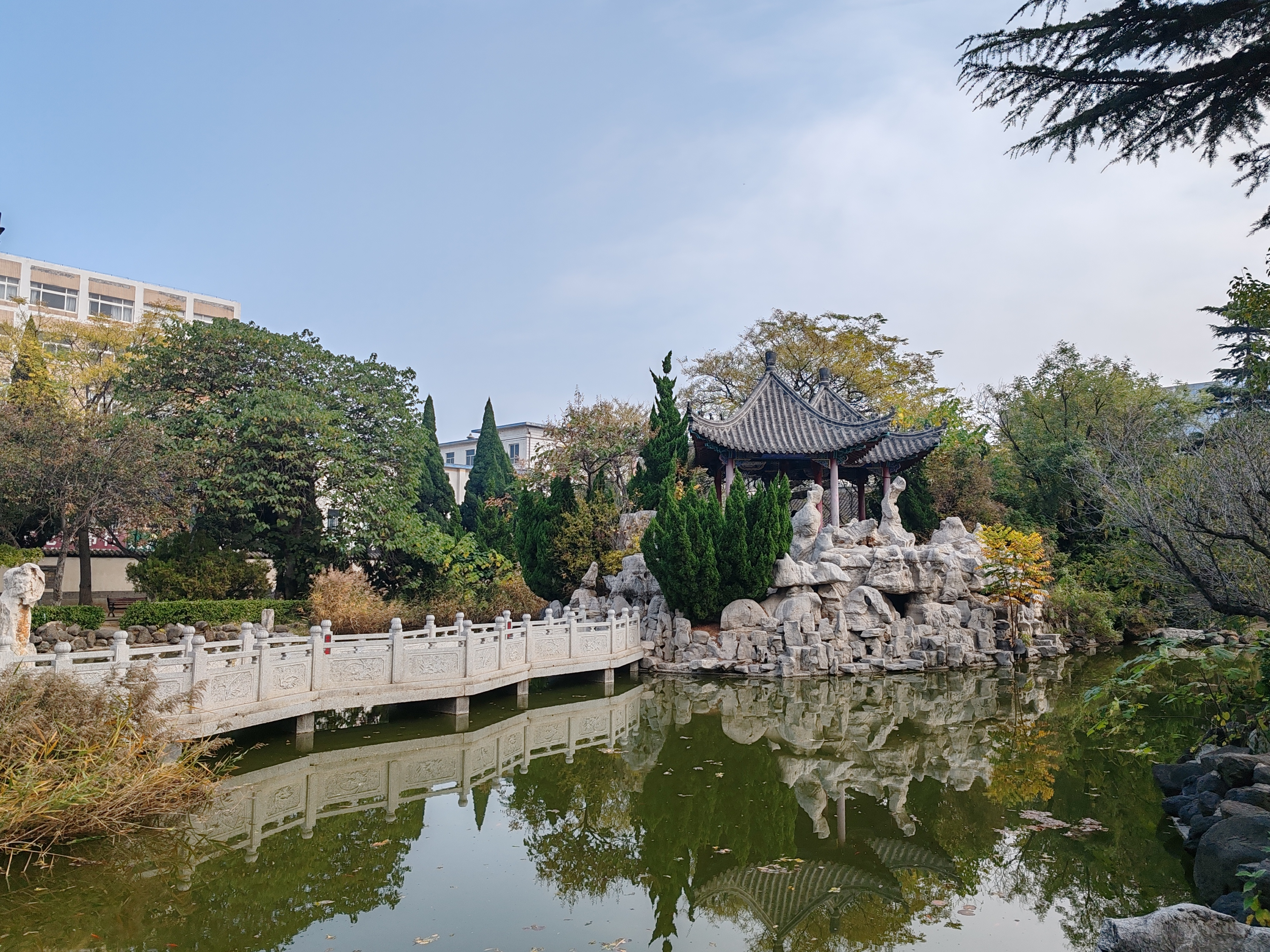
Ding Family Mansion in Huang County (now Donglai Subdistrict, Longkou, Yantai). Huang County used to be the administrative center of Donglai Commandery during Han Dynasty

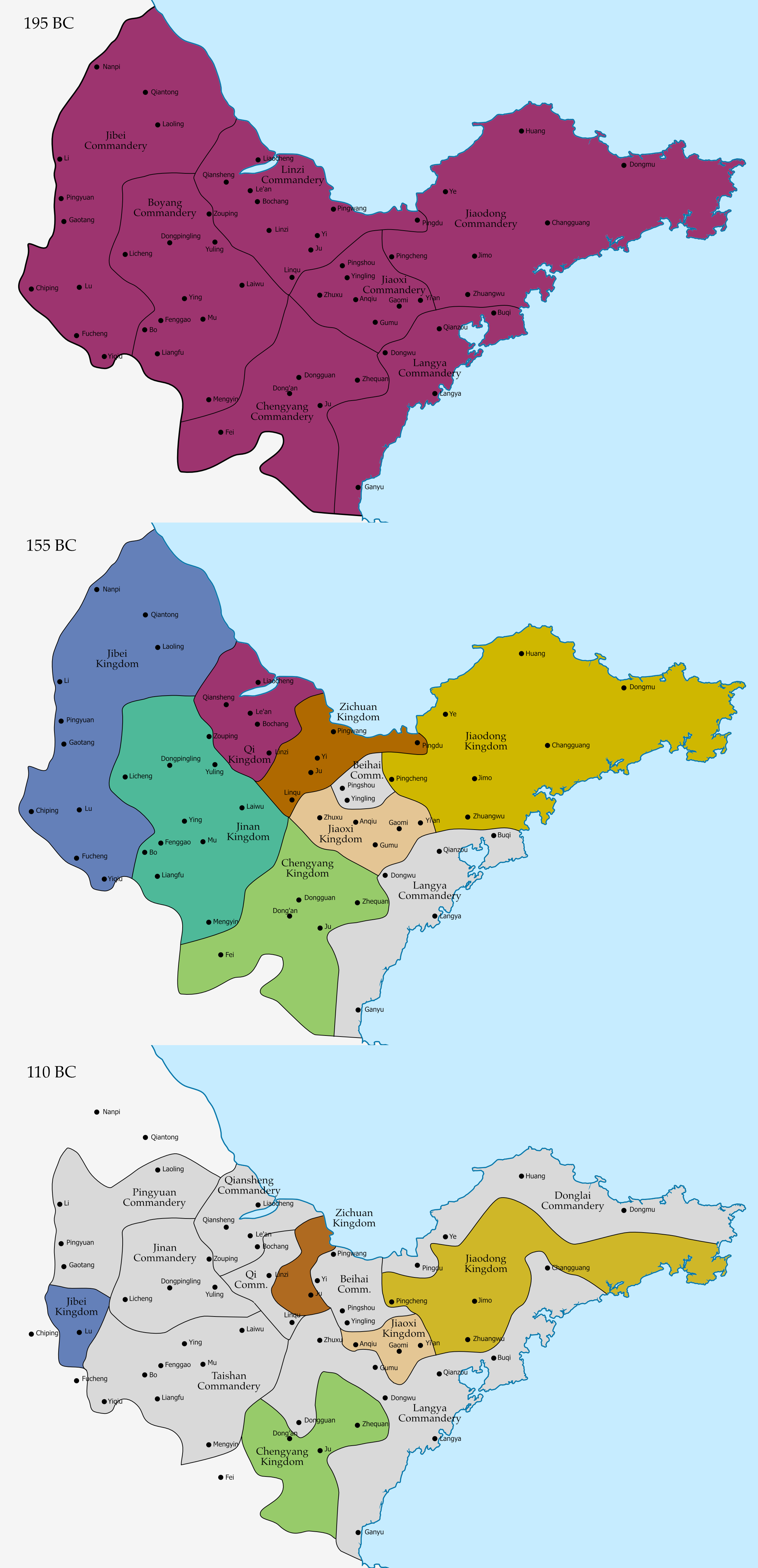
Evolution of administrative regions in Shandong in early Han Dynasty, Donglai Commandery and preceding Jiaodong Kingdom can be seen in the bottom of the picture

Donglai Commandery (Chinese: 東萊郡) was a historical Chinese commandery on the Jiaodong Peninsula, existing from Han dynasty to Tang dynasty.

Donglai Commandery was likely established during Emperor Jing of Han's reign on the lands of Jiaodong Commandery. In late Western Han dynasty, its territory included 17 counties and marquessates, namely Ye (掖), Chui (腄), Pingdu (平度), Huang (黃), Linqu (臨朐), Qucheng (曲成), Muping (牟平), Dongmu (東牟), Zang (脏), Yuli (育犁), Changyang (昌陽), Buye (不夜), Dangli (當利), Luxiang (盧鄉), Yangle (陽樂), Yangshi (陽石), and Xuxiang (徐鄉). In 140 AD during Eastern Han, the number of counties and marquessates was 13, including Huang, Muping, Jian (惤), Qucheng, Ye, Dangli, Dongmu, Changyang, Luxiang, Gelu (葛盧), Changguang (長廣), Qianzou (黔陬), and Buqi (不其), the last three of which were formerly part of Langya Commandery. During the Jian'an (建安) era of early 3rd century, Qianzou was transferred to the newly established Chengyang Commandery. Also during Jian'an Era, Changguang Commandery was established on the territory of Donglai and Beihai, covering 6 counties, although by 213 AD the commandery would have been dissolved, and the counties merged back into their respective original commanderies. Changguang Commandery was later restored in 277 AD.

In 280 AD, after the unification of China proper under the Jin dynasty, Donglai administered 6 counties. After the Disaster of Yongjia, the commandery was successively ruled by Later Zhao, Former Yan, Former Qin and Southern Yan, until it was conquered by Liu Yu of the Liu Song dynasty. Northern Wei conquered the region during Emperor Ming of Song's reign. The commandery was eventually abolished in early Sui dynasty.

In Sui and Tang dynasties, Donglai Commandery became the alternative name of Lai Prefecture. In 692, several counties were separated to form the new Deng Prefecture, later also known as Dongmu Commandery. In 742, the commandery's reduced territory covered 4 counties: Ye, Changyang, Jimo and Jiaoshui (膠水, formerly Changguang).

== Population ==
Dynasty	Western Han	Eastern Han	Western Jin	Liu Song	Northern Wei	Sui dynasty	Tang dynasty
Year	2	140	280	464	534	609	742
Households	103,292	104,297	6,500	10,131	19,195	90,351	26,998
Population	502,693	484,393		75,149	62,044		171,516
