= Qi Kingdom (Han dynasty) =

Kingdom that existed from the Chu–Han Contention period to late 2nd century BC

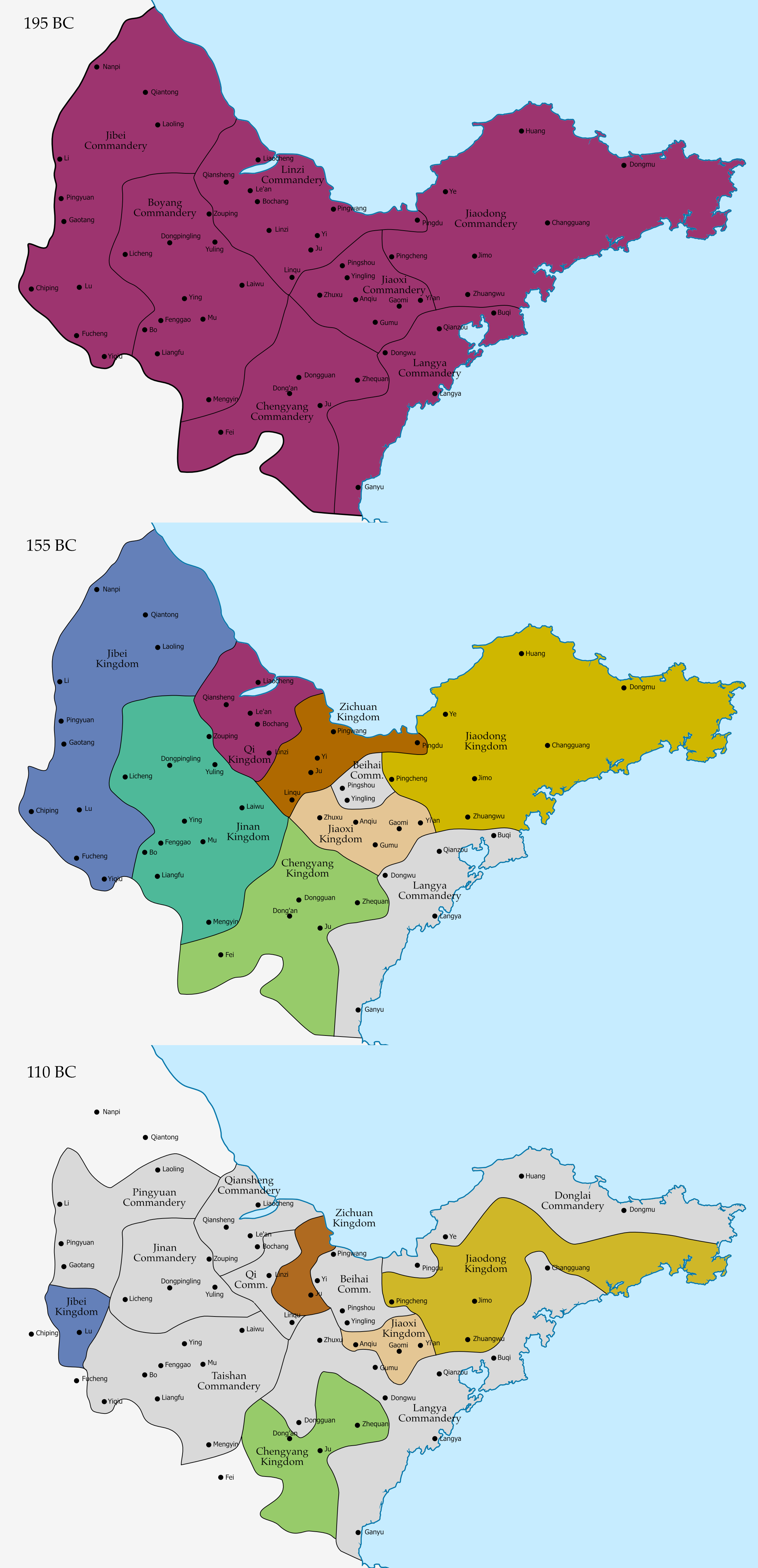
Kingdoms and commanderies in the Qi region, 195 BC (above), 155 BC (middle) and 110 BC (below).

Qi (Chinese: 齊; pinyin: Qí) was a Chinese kingdom that existed from the Chu–Han Contention period to late 2nd century BC, located in present-day Shandong and some surrounding areas.

== History ==
The kingdom was established on the former territories of the state of Qi (11th century BC – 221 BC), a great power during the Warring States period until its annexation by the Qin. In 206 BC, Xiang Yu divided the Qin empire into Eighteen Kingdoms. Three of them – Qi, Jiaodong and Jibei – were founded on Qi territories and were ruled by the former state's aristocrats. In 203 BC, the region was conquered by Han Xin, a prominent military general serving under Liu Bang, the later Emperor Gaozu of Han dynasty. Han Xin was briefly granted the title "King of Qi", but was later offered Chu instead.

In 201 BC, Emperor Gaozu installed his eldest son Liu Fei as the King of Qi, known posthumously as King Daohui. According to an order by Emperor Gaozu, "All the people who are able to speak the language of Qi shall be granted to Qi [Kingdom]." At the time, Qi consisted of seven commanderies, namely Linzi, Boyang, Jibei, Jiaodong, Jiaoxi, Chengyang and Langya.

After the death of Emperor Gaozu, the Han court was dominated by Empress Lü. In 193 BC, Liu Fei offered Chengyang to Princess Yuan of Lu, daughter of Empress Lü, as her fief. In 187 BC, a part of Jinan was split off to form the Kingdom of Lü, ruled by the empress' nephew Lü Tai (呂台). In 181 BC, Langya was also separated from Qi to form a new kingdom held by Liu Ze (劉澤), nephew-in-law of the empress.

Liu Fei died in 189 BC and was succeeded by his son Xiang. In 180 BC, Qi participated in the war against the Lü clan. Afterwards, the three commanderies Chengyang, Jinan and Langya was returned to the kingdom. Qi passed to Liu Ze (劉則), a son of Xiang, after the latter's death in 179 BC. Xiang's brothers Zhang and Xingju received Jibei and Chengyang, respectively, as their own kingdoms. Jibei was revoked by the Han government when Xingju attempted to rebel in 177 BC.

Ze died in 165 BC, leaving no male issue. Qi was subsequently divided between Fei's surviving sons. The territory under Liu Jianglü (劉將閭) retained the name "Qi", however, it only covered the Linzi Commandery. Jianglü's line continued until 126 BC. In 117 BC, the reigning Emperor Wu granted Qi to his son Liu Hong (劉閎), who also died without issue in 110 BC. Afterwards, the kingdom was converted to the Qi Commandery.

== Kings ==
Name	In Chinese	Posthumous name	In Chinese	Reigned from	Reigned to
Liu Fei	劉肥	King Daohui of Qi	齊悼惠王	201 BC	189 BC
Liu Xiang	劉襄	King Ai of Qi	齊哀王	189 BC	179 BC
Liu Ze	劉則	King Wen of Qi	齊文王	179 BC	165 BC
Liu Jianglü	劉將閭	King Xiao of Qi	齊孝王	164 BC	154 BC
Liu Shou	劉壽	King Yi of Qi	齊懿王	154 BC	131 BC
Liu Cichang	劉次昌	King Li of Qi	齊厲王	131 BC	126 BC
Liu Hong	劉閎	King Huai of Qi	齊懷王	117 BC	110 BC
