= Yi Prefecture (Shandong) =

Historical administrative division in Shandong, China

- Traditional Chinese: 沂州
Transcriptions
Standard Mandarin
- Hanyu Pinyin: Yí Zhōu
- Wade–Giles: Yi^{2} Chou^{1}

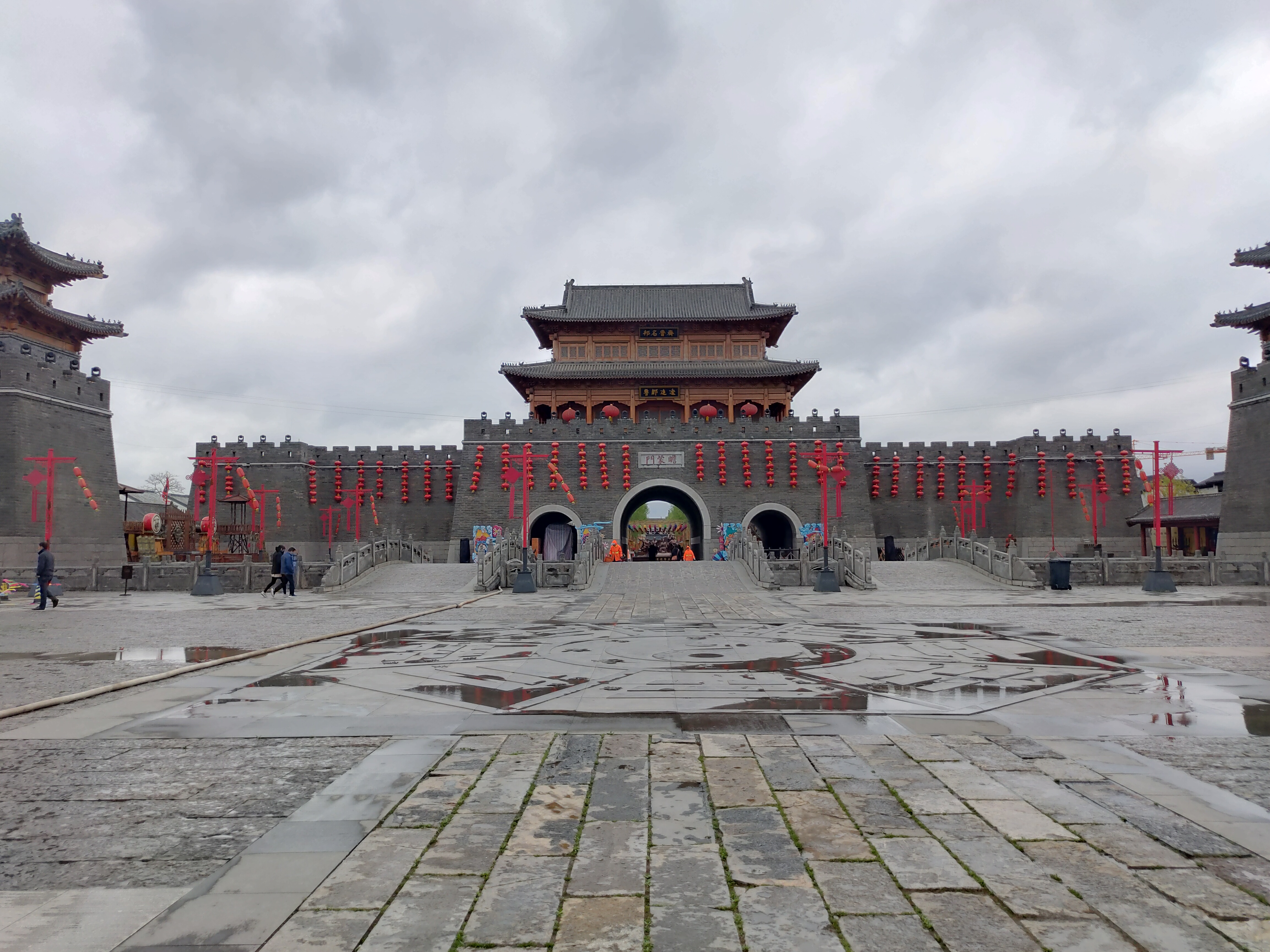
Yizhou Ancient City

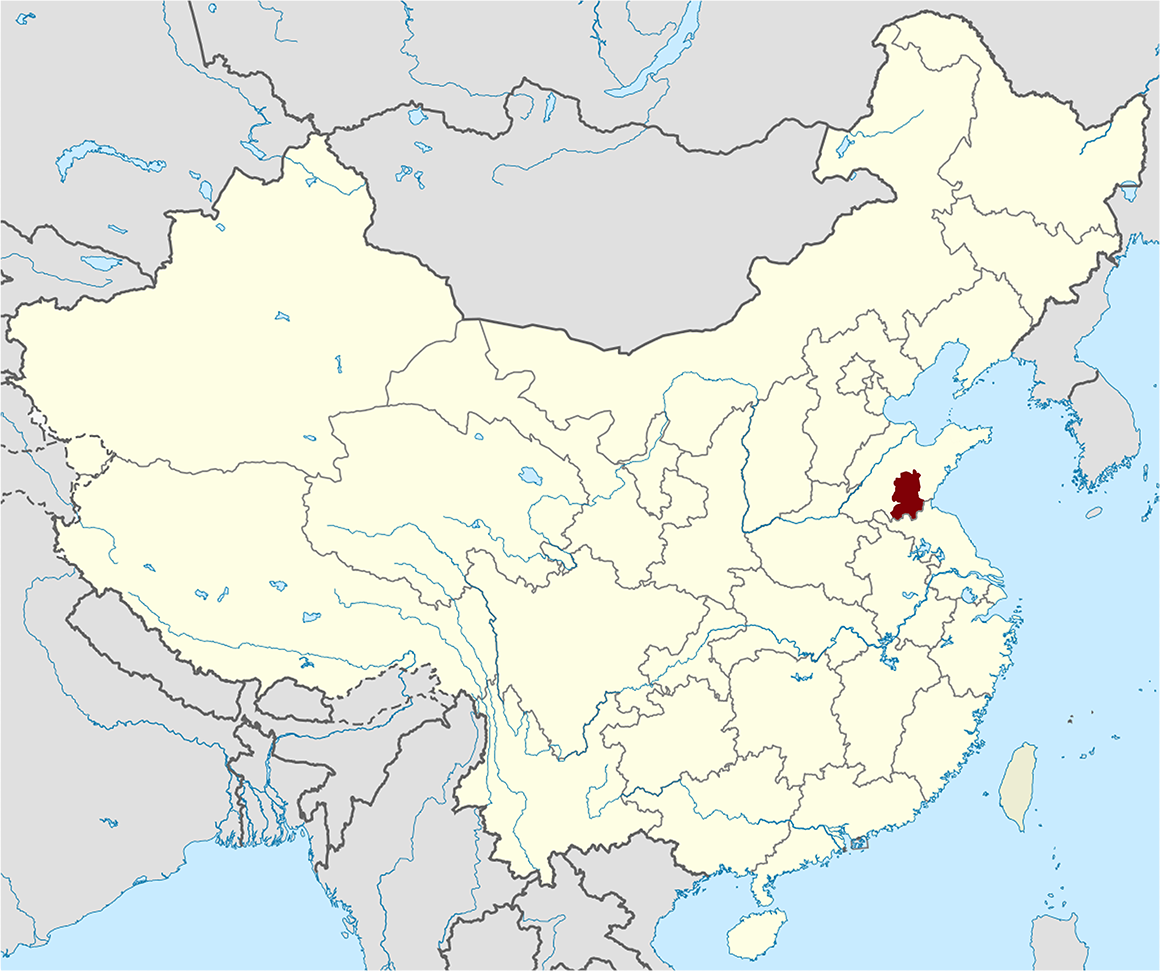
Location of Yizhou within China

Yizhou or Yi Prefecture was a zhou (prefecture) in imperial China centering on modern Linyi, Shandong, China. It existed (intermittently) from 578 until 1734, when it was recreated as Yizhou Prefecture by the Qing dynasty.

== Geography ==
The administrative region of Yi Prefecture in the Tang dynasty falls within modern Shandong. It probably includes modern:

- Under the administration of Linyi:
  - Linyi
  - Lanling County
  - Fei County
  - Pingyi County
  - Mengyin County
  - Yinan County
  - Yishui County
- Under the administration of Zaozhuang:
  - Zaozhuang
- Under the administration of Tai'an:
  - Xintai
- Under the administration of Zibo:
  - Yiyuan County

== See also ==
- Langya Commandery
- Yizhou Prefecture
