= Taishan Commandery =

Historic commandery of China

Taishan Commandery (Chinese: 泰山郡) was a historical commandery of China in present-day Shandong province, existing from Han dynasty to Sui dynasty.

Taishan Commandery was created in 122 BC, when the king of Jibei offered the land surrounding Mount Tai to the Han emperor. This region, together with a few counties from Jinan Commandery, formed the basis of Taishan Commandery. In 88 BC, Jibei was abolished, and its territories were merged into Taishan. In late Western Han dynasty, the commandery administered 24 counties: Fenggao (奉高), Bo (博), Cha (茬), Lu (盧), Feicheng (肥成), Yiqiu (蛇丘), Gang (剛), Chai (柴), Gai (蓋), Liangfu (梁父), Dongpingyang (東平陽), Nanwuyang (南武陽), Laiwu (萊蕪), Juping (鉅平), Ying (嬴), Mu (牟), Mengyin (蒙陰), Hua (華), Ningyang (寧陽), Chengqiu (乘丘), Fuyang (富陽), Taoshan (桃山), Taoxiang (桃鄉), Shi (式). The population in 2 AD was 726,604, in 172,086 households.

Several of the counties were abolished in early Eastern Han. In 90 AD, Jibei Kingdom was reestablished, and 3 counties (Lu, Yiqiu, Gang) was transferred to the new kingdom. In 140, Taishan covered 12 counties, including Fenggao, Bo, Liangfu, Juping, Cha, Laiwu, Gai, Nanwuyang, Nancheng (南城, formerly part of Donghai Commandery), Fei (費, formerly part of Donghai) and Mu. The population was 437,317.

After Jin reunification, Taishan administered 11 counties in 280, namely Fenggao, Bo, Ying, Nancheng, Liangfu, Shanchi (山茌, formerly Cha), Xintai (新泰, formerly Pingyang), Nanwuyang, Laiwu, Mu and Juping, with a total population of 9,300 households. After the Disaster of Yongjia, the commandery was successively ruled by Later Zhao, Former Yan, Former Qin and Southern Yan, until it was conquered by Liu Yu of the Liu Song dynasty. Northern Wei conquered the region during Emperor Ming of Song's reign. In Northern Wei, 6 counties, Juping, Fenggao, Boping, Ying, Mu and Liangfu, were in the commandery, with a total population of 91,673 in 26,800 households. The commandery was abolished in Northern Qi.
