= Liu Xingju =

Liu Xingju (劉興居) (died c.September 177 BC) was an important political figure during the Lü Clan Disturbance (180 BC). He was a grandson of Emperor Gaozu of Han and a son of Liu Fei, the Prince of Qi.

In 182 BC, Grand Empress Dowager Lü created him the Marquess of Dongmou and summoned him to the capital Chang'an to serve as an imperial guard commander.

After the destruction of the Lü Clan in 180 BC, Liu Xingju was initially promised the Principality of Liang for his role in the conspiracy by the new emperor, Emperor Wen (Liu Heng). When, however, the new emperor became aware that Liu Zhang had initially wanted to make his brother Liu Xiang, the Prince of Qi as emperor instead of him, he became very displeased. The new emperor therefore denied Liu Xingju the larger Principality of Liang and only created him the Prince of Jibei (a smaller principality carved out of his brother's principality) in 178 BC.

Unhappy over this slight, and probably angered by the deaths of Liu Xiang (died 179 BCE) and Liu Zhang (died c.June 177 BCE), Prince Xingju planned a rebellion. In summer 177 BC, when Emperor Wen was on a visit to his old Principality of Dai, Prince Xingju mistakenly thought that Emperor Wen was going to lead a military campaign against the Xiongnu, and therefore felt this was a suitable time to start his rebellion. When Emperor Wen heard of Prince Xingju's rebellion, he ordered Chai Wu (柴武), the Marquess of Jipu, to lead an army against Jibei forces. In autumn 177 BC, after military defeats, Prince Xingju killed himself.
