= Zichuan Kingdom =

Kingdom of the Han dynasty

Zichuan Kingdom (Chinese: 菑川國, 甾川國, 淄川國) was a kingdom of the Han dynasty, located in what is now northern Shandong.

Zichuan was separated from the Qi Kingdom in 165 BC and granted to Liu Xian (劉賢), son of Liu Fei, King of Qi. Xian was killed in the Rebellion of the Seven States, and was succeeded by his brother Liu Zhi (劉志). Zhi and his descendants held Zichuan until Wang Mang's usurpation. After the restoration of Eastern Han, the kingdom was granted to Liu Zhong (劉終), a follower of the Emperor Guangwu in the rebellion against Wang Mang. Zhong died in 34 AD, and Zichuan was converted to a commandery. In 37, the commandery was merged into Beihai.

A total of 10 kings ruled Zichuan:

- Liu Xian (賢), 164–154 BC;
- Liu Zhi (志), King Yi (懿) of Zichuan, 154–130 BC;
- Liu Jian (建), King Jing (靖) of Zichuan, 130–109 BC;
- Liu Yi (遺), King Qing (頃) of Zichuan, 109–74 BC;
- Liu Zhonggu (終古), King Si (思) of Zichuan, 74–46 BC;
- Liu Shang (尚), King Kao (考) of Zichuan, 46–39 BC;
- Liu Heng (橫), King Xiao (孝) of Zichuan, 39–9 BC;
- Liu You (友), King Huai (懷) of Zichuan, 9–2 BC;
- Liu Yong (永), 2 BC – 8 AD;
- Liu Zhong (終), 26–34.

In late Western Han, the kingdom consisted of 3 counties: Ju (劇), Dong'anping (東安平) and Louxiang (樓鄉). In 2 AD, the population was 227,031, or 50,289 households.
