= Jibei Kingdom =

Kingdom of Han dynasty

The commandery-county system of Shandong during the Qin dynasty, 221-206 BC, Jibei is shown in the center, with the capital in Boyang (in today's southeast Daiyue, Shandong province)

Jibei Kingdom (Chinese: 濟北國) was a kingdom of Han dynasty, in present-day northern Shandong and southern Hebei.

The kingdom was first established on the lands of Qi in 178 BC for Liu Xingju, son of Liu Fei, Prince of Qi, King of Qi. In 177 BC, Xingju committed suicide after a failed attempt of rebellion, and Jibei was merged back to Qi. In 164 BC, Jibei again became a kingdom under Liu Zhi (劉志), another son of Fei. After the Rebellion of the Seven States, Zhi was stripped of his fief, and part of Jibei was transferred to Liu Bo (劉勃), a former Prince of Hengshan (衡山) and son of Liu Chang (劉長), Prince of Huainan (淮南), while the rest was separated to become Pingyuan Commandery. Bo and his descendants held Jibei until 86 BC. Afterwards, the kingdom was abolished and merged into Taishan Commandery.

Jibei Kingdom was established for a second time in 90 AD, and granted to Liu Shou (劉壽), son of Emperor Zhang. The kingdom lasted to the end of Eastern Han. Jibei was subsequently converted to a commandery, though it would again become the fief of various imperial princes during Cao Wei and Western Jin dynasties. In 140 AD, the kingdom consisted of 5 counties, Lu (盧), Sheqiu (蛇丘), Gang (剛), Cheng (成) and Chiping (茌平). The population was 235,897, or 45,689 households.

== Kings of Jibei ==
- Liu Xingju, 178–177 BC;
- Liu Zhi (志), 164–154 BC;
- Liu Bo (勃), King Zhen (貞) of Jibei, 154–152 BC;
- Liu Hu (胡), King Cheng (成) of Jibei, 151–97 BC;
- Liu Kuan (寬), 97–86 BC;
- Liu Shou (壽), King Hui (惠) of Jibei, 90–121;
- Liu Deng (登), King Jie (節) of Jibei, 121–136;
- Liu Duo (多), King Ai (哀) of Jibei, 136–139;
- Liu Anguo (安國), King Li (釐) of Jibei, 139–146;
- Liu Ci (次), King Xiao (孝) of Jibei, 146–163;
- Liu Luan (鸞), 163–198;
- Liu Zheng (政), 198–206;
- Liu Miao (邈), 212–220.

== See also ==
- Jinan Commandery
