= Liu Fei, Prince of Qi =

Han dynasty prince (died 190 BC)

Liu Fei
- King/Prince of Qi
- Reign: 201–late 190 BC
- Born: Unknown
- Died: c.Nov 190 BC
Posthumous name
- King Daohui of Qi (齊悼惠王)
- Father: Emperor Gaozu of Han
- Mother: Consort Cao

Liu Fei (simplified Chinese: 刘肥; traditional Chinese: 劉肥), formally King Daohui of Qi (Chinese: 齊悼惠王; died c. November 190 BC) was the eldest son of Liu Bang, Emperor Gaozu of Han, and Consort Cao—initially his mistress when they lived in the same village. After Liu Bang decisively defeated Xiang Yu in the Battle of Gaixia in 202 BC, he proclaimed himself the emperor of the new Han dynasty and named Liu Fei, his first son, the King of Qi.

In c.December 194 BC, when Liu Fei made an official visit to the capital, he and Emperor Hui of Han (his younger half-brother) both attended a feast put on by Empress Dowager Lü. Emperor Hui, honoring the prince as an older brother, asked him to take a seat at the table even more honored than his own. The empress dowager was greatly offended and instructed her servants to pour two cups of poisoned wine which were set on the table between the trio. She ordered Liu Fei to toast her, while ignoring Emperor Hui. As Liu Fei was about to drink the poisoned wine, Emperor Hui, knowing his mother's murderously jealous temperament and remembering how his other brother Liu Ruyi had died, suddenly reached for the second cup, which the Empress did not intend. (The second cup was a decoy, placed there only to suggest to Liu Fei that she would return his toast, as ritual required, although he would die immediately on drinking his, so she would not need to drink the other cup. Her resentment toward Liu Fei fully captured her attention and she did not even think of her son's presence.) Empress Dowager Lü jumped up and slapped the second cup away from Emperor Hui, spilling it. Liu Fei realized the trick and left, pretending to be already drunk. In the end, he was only able to leave the capital by offering to the Empress an entire commandery from his principality, to be the feudal estate of Princess Yuan of Lu. Empress Dowager Lü, who greatly loved her daughter as well, was pleased and let Liu Fei return to his principality.

== Family ==
- Father
  - Emperor Gaozu of Han (eldest son of)
- Mother
  - Consort Cao—Emperor Gaozu's initial mistress
- Wife
  - Princess Si, mother of Prince Xiang
- Children
  - Liu Xiang (劉襄), Prince Ai of Qi (齊哀王) (died 179 BC)
  - Liu Zhang (劉章), Prince Jing of Chengyang (城陽景王) (died 177 BC)
  - Liu Xingju (劉興居), Marquess of Dongmou (committed suicide 177 BC)
  - Liu Bajun (劉罢军), Marquess of Guangong
  - Liu Ningguo (劉宁国), Marquess of Guaqiu
  - Liu Xindu (劉信都), Marquess of Ningping
  - Liu An (劉安), Marquess Gong of Yangqiu
  - Liu Jianglü (劉将闾), Prince Xiao of Qi (created after his nephew Liu Ze died sonless)
  - Liu Piguang (劉辟光), Prince of Jinan, one of the seven princes in Rebellion of the Seven States.
  - Liu Zhi (劉志), Prince of Jibei, later Prince of Zichuan.
  - Liu Ang (劉卬), Prince of Jiaoxi, one of the seven princes.
  - Liu Xian (劉贤), Prince of Zichuan, one of the seven princes.
  - Liu Xiongqu (劉雄渠), Prince of Jiaodong, one of the seven princes.

Prince Daohui of Qi House of Liu Died: 189 BC
Chinese royalty
Preceded by Han Xin	Prince of Qi; 202 BC – 189 BC	Succeeded by Liu Xiang
