= Liu Piguang =

Chinese prince

Liu Piguang (simplified Chinese: 刘辟光; traditional Chinese: 劉辟光; died 154 BC) was the ninth son of Liu Fei and grandson of Emperor Gaozu of Han. When Liu Ze, Prince of Qi, died without an heir in 165 BC, Emperor Wen of Han divided the Qi territory in the land among the living sons of Liu Fei. In 164, Piguang was named Prince of Jinan and received part of the former Qi land. In 154 BC, he joined the Rebellion of the Seven States initiated by Liu Pi, Prince of Wu. Piguang was defeated and killed in battle with generals Dou Ying and Zhou Yafu. His land was returned to Han and his title was abolished.

Prince of Jinan House of Liu Died: 154 BC
Chinese royalty
New creation	Prince of Jinan; 164 BC – 154 BC	Vacant Title next held by Liu Kang
