= Wu Kingdom (Han dynasty) =

Wu (Chinese: 吳; pinyin: Wú) was a kingdom of China's Han dynasty, located in what is now southern Jiangsu and northern Zhejiang provinces.

== History ==
In 201 BC, Emperor Gaozu of Han arrested and executed Han Xin, the King of Chu. Wu Kingdom was then founded on the eastern half of Chu's former territories. Its first king was Liu Jia (劉賈), a relative of the emperor. In 196 BC, Jia died in during Ying Bu's rebellion, and the emperor granted the title to his nephew Liu Pi.

The land of Wu initially consisted of three commanderies – Wu, Dongyang and Zhang, which were further divided into more than 50 counties. According to the Records of the Grand Historian, Pi claimed that Wu's territories stretched for 3,000 li, and could support an army of 500,000. In 154 BC, Liu Pi launched the Rebellion of Seven States. He was defeated and killed in the same year, and Wu Kingdom was subsequently abolished.
