= Qi Commandery =

Historical commandery of China

Western Han dynasty in 195 BC, with the fiefs shown in red.

The Qi Commandery (Chinese: 齊郡) was a historical commandery of China, located in what is now central Shandong.

== History ==
The commandery was established in the Qin dynasty, possibly as Linzi Commandery (臨菑郡). In early Western Han dynasty, it became part of the Qi Kingdom under Liu Fei, son of Liu Bang, and his descendants. In 165 BC, Liu Ze (劉則), the grandson of Fei and reigning King of Qi, died without issue and the Han court divided the kingdom among the sons of Fei. Linzi Commandery became the fief of Liu Jianglü (劉將閭) and retained the name "Qi", although it was only a fraction of Fei's Qi Kingdom. In 127 BC, Liu Cichang (劉次昌) died without issue, and the territory became directly administered by the Han central government as the Qi Commandery. In late Western Han dynasty, the commandery consisted of 12 counties and marquessates: Linzi (臨淄), Changguo (昌國), Li (利), Xi'an (西安), Juding (鉅定), Guang (廣), Guangrao (廣饒), Zhaonan (昭南), Linqu (臨朐), Beixiang (北鄉), Pingguang (平廣) and Taixiang (臺鄉). The total population in 2 AD was 554,444, in 154,826 households. The seat was Linzi, capital of the Warring States era Qi state.

In Eastern Han dynasty, Qi was the fief of Liu Zhang (劉章), nephew of Emperor Guangwu, and his descendants until 206 AD. In 140 AD, there were 6 counties, namely Linzi, Xi'an, Changguo, Linqu, Guang and Banyang (般陽), with a total population of 491,765 (64,415 households).

In Cao Wei dynasty, Qi was granted to Cao Fang, adopted son of Emperor Ming of Wei. After the foundation of Western Jin, Qi was granted to Sima You, brother of Emperor Wu, and passed to his descendants until the Yongjia era.

In Northern Wei, Qi administered 9 counties, including Linzi, Changguo, Yidu (益都), Panyang (盤陽), Pingchang (平昌), Guangrao, Xi'an, Anping (安平) and Guangchuan (廣川). According to the Book of Wei, the population was 82,100, in 30,848 households. The commandery was abolished in early Sui dynasty.

In Sui and Tang dynasties, Qi Commandery became an alternative name of Qi Prefecture (齊州). In 741, there were 6 counties, namely Licheng, Zhangqiu, Linyi (臨邑), Linji (臨濟), Changqing (長清) and Yucheng. The population was 365,972, in 62,485 households.
