= Beihai Commandery =

Historic commandery of China

Beihai Commandery (Chinese: 北海郡) was a historical commandery of China, located in present-day northern Shandong province.

Beihai was created during Emperor Jing of Han's reign. According to Zhou Zhenhe, Beihai was likely established on six counties from Jiaoxi Kingdom, and gradually expanded its borders over the rest of Western Han as marquessates from neighboring kingdoms were added to the commandery. In late Western Han, it covered 26 counties and marquessates: Yingling (營陵), Jukui (劇魁), Anqiu (安丘), Zhi (瓡), Chunyu (淳于), Yi (益), Pingshou (平壽), Ju (劇), Duchang (都昌), Pingwang (平望), Pingdi (平的), Liuquan (柳泉), Shouguang (壽光), Lewang (樂望), Rao (饒), Zhen (斟), Sangdu (桑犢), Pingcheng (平城), Mixiang (密鄉), Yangshi (羊石), Ledu (樂都), Shixiang (石鄉), Shangxiang (上鄉), Xincheng (新成), Chengxiang (成鄉) and Jiaoyang (膠陽). The population in 2 AD was 593,159, or 127,000 households.

In early Eastern Han, the neighboring commanderies Zichuan, Gaomi and Jiaodong were merged into Beihai. In 52, it became a kingdom, and was gifted to Liu Xing (劉興), who was the adopted son of Liu Zhong (劉仲), a brother of the Emperor Guangwu, as his fief. His descendants held the kingdom until 206, when it was converted to a commandery again. The Book of Later Han recorded 7 kings of Beihai:

- Liu Xing (興), King Jing (靖) of Beihai, 52–65;
- Liu Mu (睦), King Jing (敬) of Beihai, 65–76;
- Liu Ji (基), King Ai (哀) of Beihai, 76–90;
- Liu Wei (威), 90–97;
- Liu Pu (普), King Qing (頃) of Beihai, 107–125;
- Liu Yi (翼), King Gong (恭) of Beihai, 125–140;
- King Kang (康) of Beihai, 140–?

In 140 AD, the kingdom administered 18 counties and marquessates: Ju, Yingling, Pingshou, Duchang, Anqiu, Chunyu, Pingchang (平昌), Zhuxu (朱虛), Dong'anping (東安平), Gaomi (高密), Chang'an (昌安), Yi'an (夷安), Jiaodong (膠東), Jimo (即墨), Zhuangwu (壯武), Xiami (下密) and Ting (挺). The population was 853,604, or 158,641 households. ] Kong Rong was a noted governor during the Late Han dynasty - he later surrendered the territory to Yuan Tan.

From Cao Wei to Jin dynasties, Beihai's territory was much reduced, as a number of new commanderies including Gaomi, Chengyang (城陽) and Pingchang was created. In Liu Song dynasty, Beihai covered 6 counties (Duchang, Jiaodong, Ju, Jimo, Xiami, Pingshou) and had a population of 35,995, in 3,968 households. During Emperor Ming of Song's reign, the region was conquered by Northern Wei along with the rest of Song territories north of Huai River. The commandery was abolished in early Sui dynasty.

In Sui and Tang dynasties, Beihai Commandery became an alternative name of Qing Prefecture. In 741, there were 7 counties, namely Yidu, Linzi, Qiansheng (千乘), Shouguang, Linqu, Bochang (博昌) and Beihai. The population was 402,704, in 73,148 households.
