= Rebellion of the Seven States =

154 BC rebellion against the Han dynasty of China

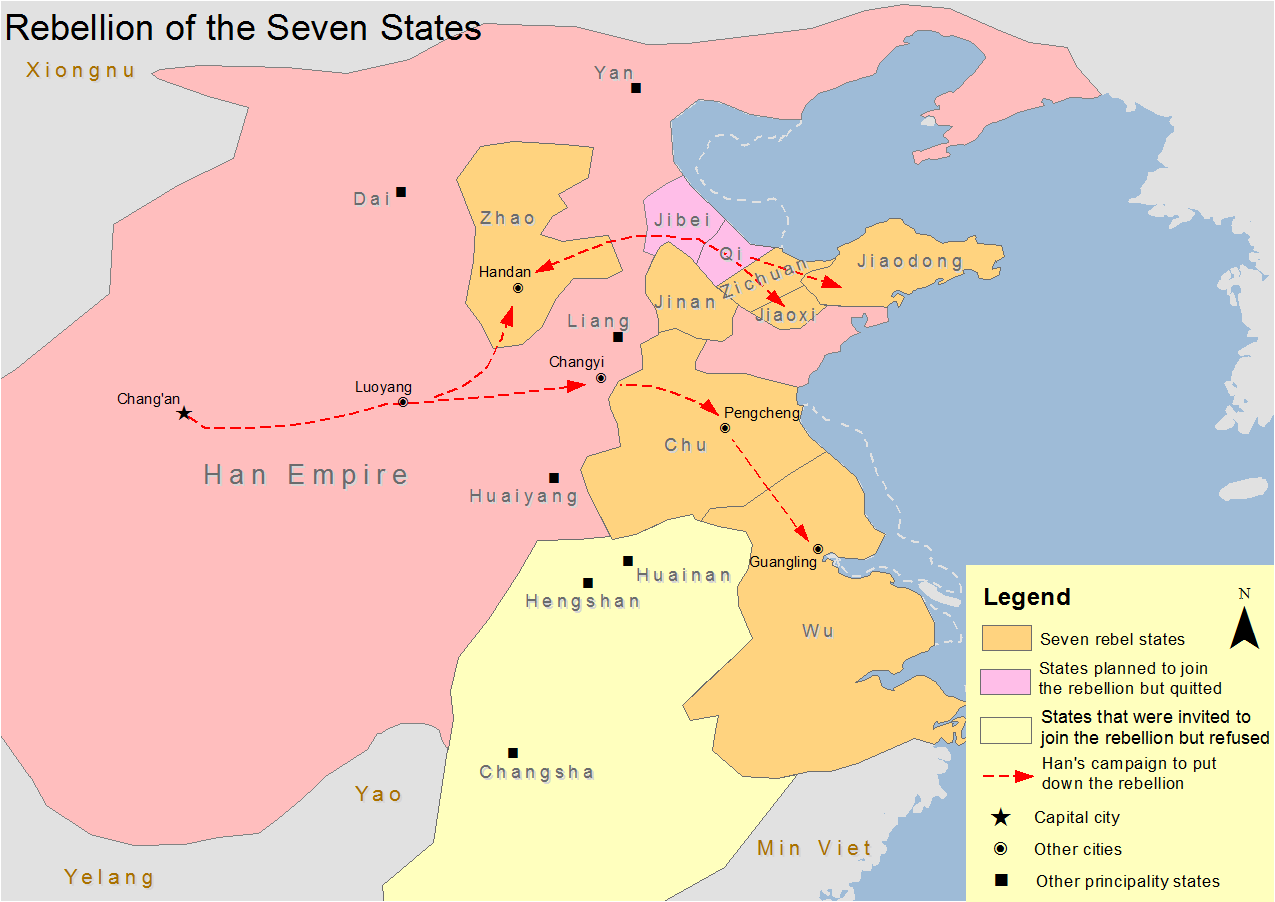
- Map showing the Rebellion of Seven States during the Han dynasty
Date	154 BC
Location	Eastern China
Result	Han victory, further centralization of imperial power

Belligerents
Han dynasty	Seven States: Wu; Chu; Zhao; Jiaoxi; Jiaodong; Zichuan; Jinan

Commanders and leaders
Emperor Jing of Han; Zhou Yafu; Dou Ying; Li Guang	Liu Pi; Liu Wu; Liu Piguang; Liu Sui; Liu Xiongqu; Liu Ang; Liu Xian

Strength
360,000 troops	200,000 Wu troops; 300,000 troops from the other states

Casualties and losses
Unknown	All troops either deserted, or were captured or killed

The Rebellion of the Seven States or Revolt of the Seven Kingdoms (simplified Chinese: 七国之乱; traditional Chinese: 七國之亂; pinyin: Qī Guó zhī Luàn) took place in 154 BC against the rule of Emperor Jing of the Western Han dynasty by its regional semi-autonomous kings, to resist the emperor's attempt to centralize the government further. The rebellion was crushed by the Western Han imperial forces within three months, and the powers of the imperial court grew exponentially afterward.

== Background ==
At the beginning of the Han dynasty, Liu Bang—Emperor Gaozu of Han—created princely titles for many of his relatives in certain territories that accounted for between approximately one-third to one-half of the empire. This was an attempt to consolidate Liu family rule over the parts of China that were not ruled directly from the capital under the commandery (simplified Chinese: 郡县; traditional Chinese: 郡縣; pinyin: jùnxiàn) system.

During the reign of Emperor Wen, these princes were still setting their own laws, but in addition they were minting their own coins (albeit with Emperor Wen's approval) and collecting their own taxes. Many princes were effectively ignoring the imperial government's authority within their own principalities. When Emperor Jing became emperor in 157 BC, the rich principality of Wu was especially domineering.

== Prelude ==
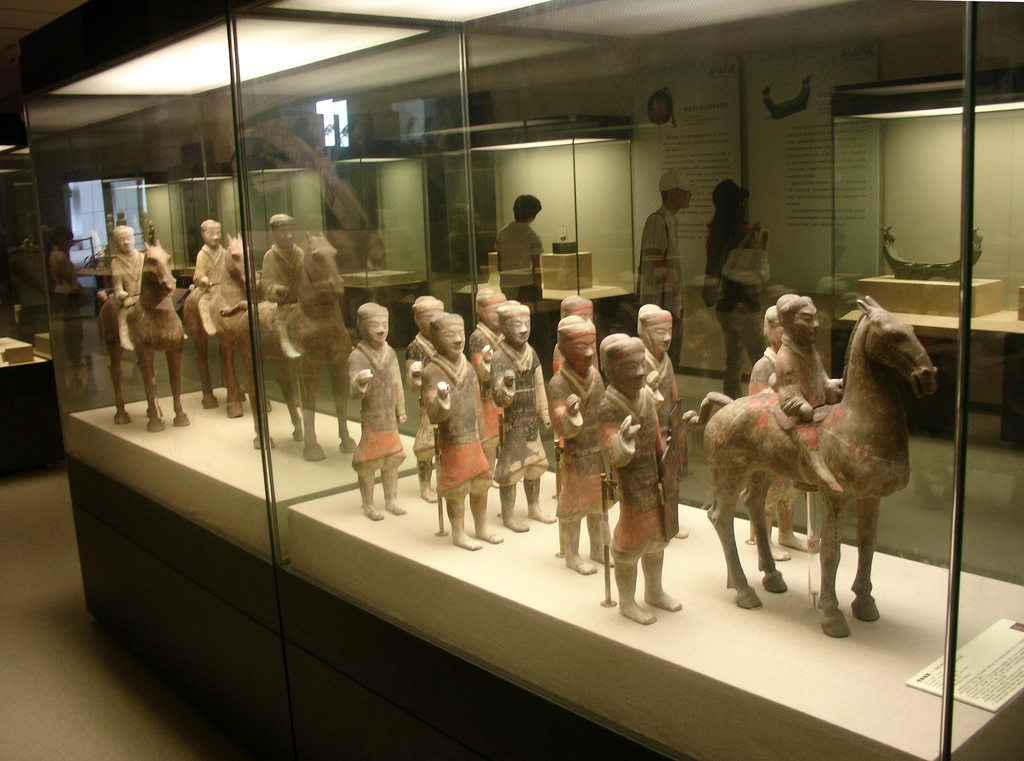
Western Han miniature pottery infantry (foreground) and cavalry (background); in 1990, when the tomb complex of Emperor Jing of Han (r. 157–141 BC) and his wife Empress Wang Zhi (d. 126 BC) was excavated north of Yangling, over 40,000 miniature pottery figures were unearthed. All of them were one-third life size, smaller than the 8,000-some fully life size soldiers of the Terracotta Army buried alongside the First Emperor of Qin. Smaller miniature figurines, on average 60 centimeters (24 in) in height, have also been found in various royal Han tombs where they were placed to guard the deceased tomb occupants in their afterlife.

Emperor Jing already had an inimical relationship with his cousin-once-removed Liu Pi, Prince of Wu, the nephew of his grandfather, Han founder Emperor Gaozu. The principality of Wu enjoyed, among other natural resources, abundant copper and salt supplies.

Around 179-175 BC, when Emperor Jing was still Crown Prince Qi, Liu Pi's heir apparent Liu Xian (Chinese: 劉賢) had been on an official visit to the capital Chang'an and they competed in a liubo board game. During arguments over the game, Liu Xian offended Crown Prince Qi, who beat him to death with the board. Liu Pi hated Emperor Jing for causing the death of Liu Xian.

Emperor Jing's key advisor Chao Cuo suggested using as excuses offenses that the princes had committed which had generally been ignored by Emperor Wen, that he cut down the sizes of the principalities to make them less threatening. Chao explicitly contemplated the possibility that Wu and other principalities might rebel, but justified the action by asserting that if they were going to rebel, it would be better to let them rebel earlier than later when they might be more prepared.

Emperor Jing, in 154 BC, thus ordered the following punishments:

- He carved out the commandery of Donghai from the Principality of Chu (modern northern Jiangsu and northern Anhui), based on Liu Wu, Prince of Chu, being caught drinking during the mourning period for Empress Dowager Bo.
- He carved out the commandery of Changshan from the Principality of Zhao (modern central and southern Hebei), based on an unspecified offence.
- He carved out six counties from the principality of Jiaoxi (roughly modern Weifang, Shandong), based on Liu Ang, the Prince of Jiaoxi, embezzling funds from the sales of titles intended for paying border patrol costs.
- Carving out the commanderies of Kuaiji (Note: Wu Commandery.) and Zhang (Note: Zhang Commandery was later renamed Danyang Commandery. In the Records of the Grand Historian, it was erroneously listed as Yuzhang Commandery.) from the Principality of Wu, based on various offences by Liu Pi, the Prince of Wu.

== Rebellion ==
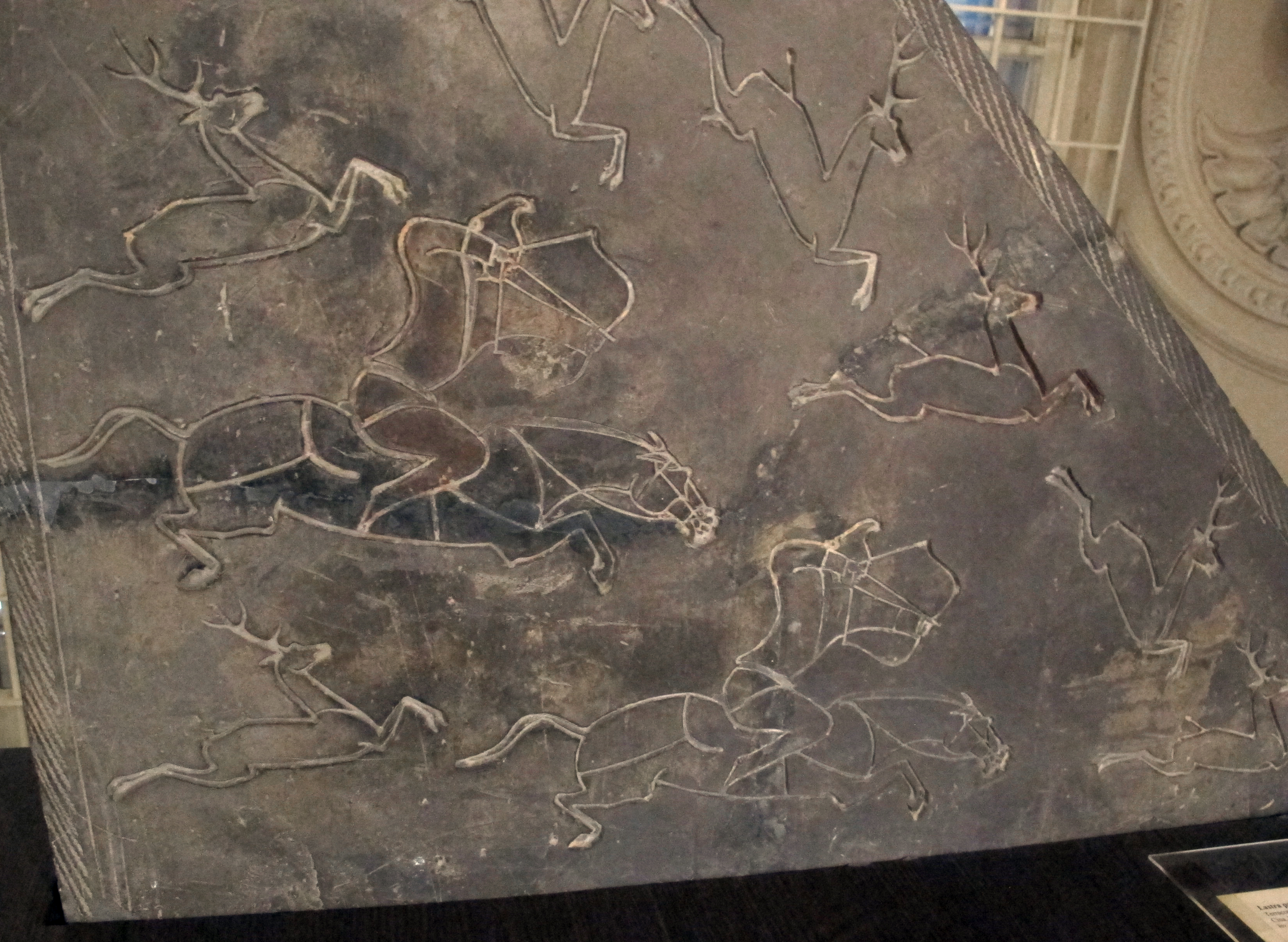
Wall fragment from a Chinese tomb, with an incised relief decoration showing a hunting scene with mounted archery, Han dynasty (202 BC - 220 AD) National Museum of Oriental Art, Rome

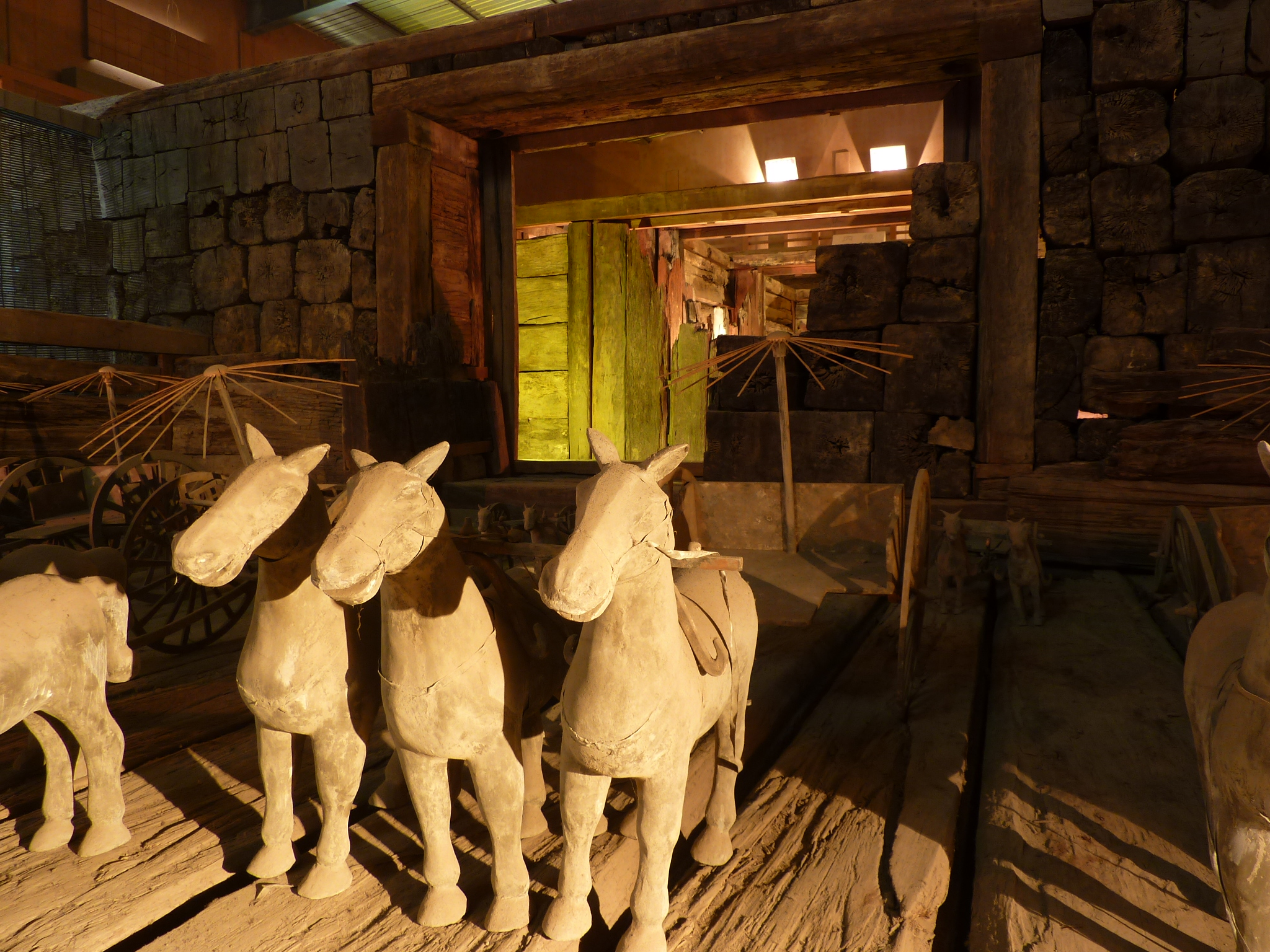
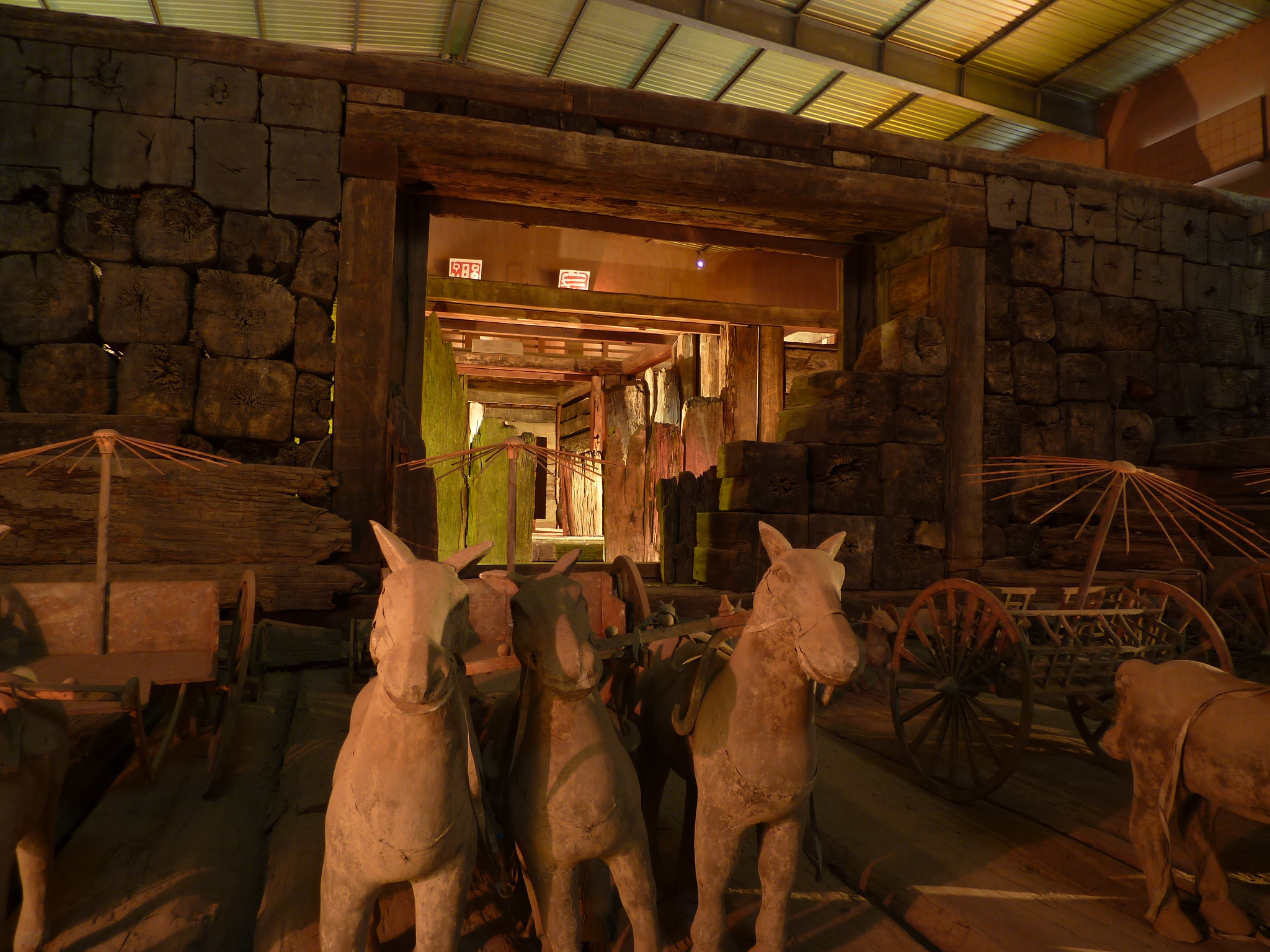
Ceramic statues of horse-drawn chariots from the tomb of the wife of Liu Xu (劉胥), Prince Li of Guangling (廣陵厲王), a son of Emperor Wu of Han who committed suicide 53 BC

In response to these actions, Liu Pi organized a rebellion. The seven actively participating princes were:

- Liu Pi (劉濞), Prince of Wu.
- Liu Wu (劉戊), Prince of Chu.
- Liu Ang (劉卬), Prince of Jiaoxi.
- Liu Xiongqu (劉雄渠), Prince of Jiaodong.
- Liu Xian (劉賢), Prince of Zichuan.
- Liu Piguang (劉辟光), Prince of Jinan.
- Liu Sui (劉遂), Prince of Zhao.

Two other principalities—Qi (modern central Shandong) and Jibei (modern northwestern Shandong)--agreed to join but neither actually did. Liu Jianglü (劉將閭), Prince of Qi, changed his mind at the final moment and chose to resist the rebel forces, and Liu Zhi (劉志), Prince of Jibei, was put under house arrest by the commander of his guards and prevented from joining the rebellion.

Three other princes were asked to join but either refused or merely did not join:

- Liu An (劉安), Prince of Huainan (roughly modern Lu'an, Anhui)
- Liu Ci (劉賜), Prince of Lujiang (roughly modern Chaohu, Anhui)
- Liu Bo (劉勃), Prince of Hengshan (roughly part of modern Lu'an, Anhui).

The seven princes also requested help from the southern independent kingdoms of Donghai (modern Zhejiang) and Minyue (modern Fujian), and the powerful Xiongnu in the north. Donghai and Minyue sent troops to participate in the campaign, but the Xiongnu, after initially promising to do so, did not.

The seven princes claimed that Chao Cuo was aiming to wipe out the principalities and that they would be satisfied if Chao were executed.

== Rebel campaigns and strategies ==
The four principalities on the periphery of Qi aimed to conquer Qi and divide it. Zhao forces headed west but stayed within the borders to wait for Wu and Chu forces, which were considered the main force in the rebellion.

Liu Pi, the Prince of Wu, had several strategies suggested to him that he considered:-

- A suggestion by Tian Lubo (田祿伯) to have two main forces—one to be led by Liu Pi himself, attacking the Principality of Liang (modern eastern Henan), and one to be led by Tian that would head west by the Yangtze River and the Han River to make a surprise attack directly on the capital Chang'an.
- A suggestion by a Gen. Huan (桓) to ignore all cities on the way and leapfrog to attack Luoyang and seize the plentiful supply of food and weapons near Luoyang.
- A suggestion (probably by Liu Pi's heir apparent Liu Ju (劉駒)) to concentrate the forces to attack Liang and destroy it first.

Liu Pi accepted the final suggestion, concerned that if he gave Tian a large force he might rebel, and that Huan's plan was too dangerous. Wu and Chu forces therefore concentrated against the loyalist kingdom of Liang, ruled by Emperor Jing's younger brother Liu Wu, whose fief shielded the eastern entrance into the Guanzhong heartland. Facing the blunt of rebel assault, Liu Wu's forces initially suffered devastating defeats and was forced to withdraw into his capital Suiyang (present-day Shangqiu in Henan), which the Wu and Chu forces then proceeded to besiege.

== Emperor Jing's responses ==
In accordance with instructions left by Emperor Wen, Emperor Jing commissioned Zhou Yafu as the commander of his armed forces to face the main rebel force—the joint forces of Wu and Chu. He commissioned Li Ji (酈寄), the Marquess of Quzhou, to attack Zhao, and Gen. Luan Bu (欒布) to try to relieve the siege of Qi. Dou Ying (竇嬰) was put in command of Li and Luan's forces, to coordinate them at his headquarters set at Xingyang.

== Main campaign ==
Wu and Chu forces continued to attack Liang's capital Suiyang fiercely. Zhou Yafu suggested to Emperor Jing that the proper strategy was not to engage Wu and Chu forces head on because, in particular, Chu forces were known for their ferocity and excellent mobility. Rather, his plan was to let Liang take the brunt of the attack, bypass Liang, and cut off the Wu and Chu supply lines to starve the rebel forces. Emperor Jing agreed, and Zhou set out from the capital Chang'an to join his main forces, already gathered at Yingyang. Wu and Chu prepared assassins on the way between Chang'an and Yingyang to assassinate Zhou, but Zhou, having been warned by the soldier Zhao She (趙涉), went by a circuitous route and avoided the assassins.

After taking command of his forces, Zhou headed toward Changyi (昌邑, in modern Jining, Shandong) to prepare to cut off the Wu and Chu supply routes. At this time Liang appeared to be in great danger, and Prince Liu Wu sent messenger after messenger to seek immediate assistance from Zhou, which Zhou ignored. Emperor Jing, concerned for his brother, ordered Zhou to head to Liang immediately to save it. Zhou refused, and instead sent a cavalry force to cut off the Wu and Chu supply lines. The strategy was effective. Wu and Chu, unable to capture Liang quickly due to the strong defence put up by the prince's Gen. Han Anguo (韓安國) and Gen. Zhang Yu (張羽), headed northeast to attack Zhou. Zhou refused to engage in a direct battle with Wu and Chu forces, but rather concentrated on defending his camp. After being unable to get a decisive victory over Zhou, the Wu and Chu forces began to suffer from starvation and collapsed. Liu Pi fled to Donghai; Donghai killed him and sought peace with Han. Liu Wu, the prince of Chu, committed suicide.

== Other theaters ==
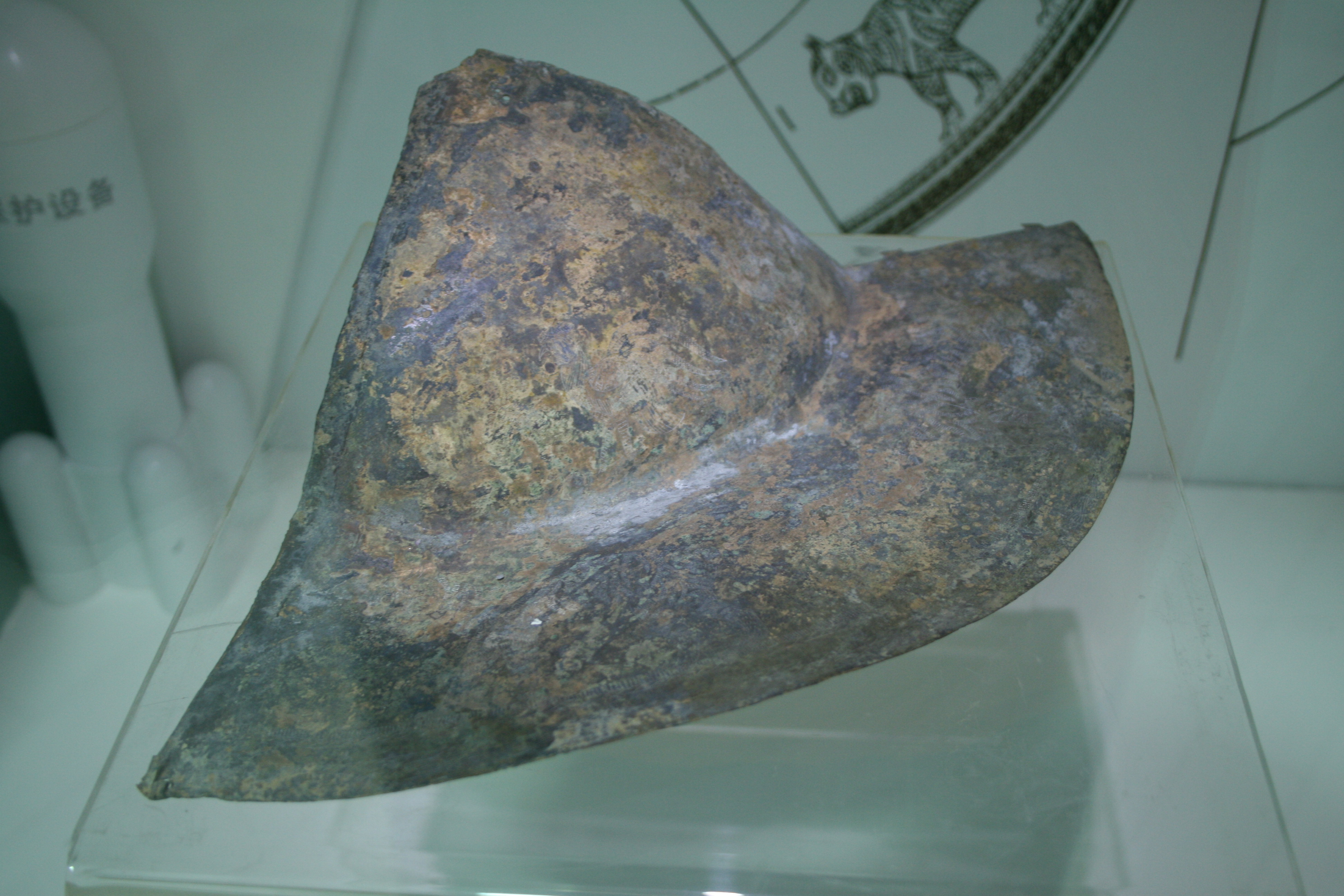
Iron helmet, Western Han period

The only other theater that Wu forces engaged in was a small one. Liu Pi's guest Zhou Qiu (周丘) was looked down on by Liu Pi, but he, with Liu Pi's approval, had some successes with a surprising plan he hatched. He headed to his home town Xiapi and, under the guise of being an imperial messenger, had the county magistrate killed and took over the county's militia. He then persuaded the people of the county to join the rebellion, and they headed north and had victories over the forces of the Principality of Chengyang (modern southeastern Shandong). However, after hearing that Liu Pi had been defeated, Zhou was so taken by anxiety that he died.

Meanwhile, four principalities were besieging the Qi capital Linzi. Liu Jianglü, the Prince of Qi, considered surrendering, but his resolve to resist was strengthened when his messenger Lu (路), who had been captured by the four princes, told him from under the walls of the capital to resist (even though he was under threat from the four princes to persuade Prince Jianglü to surrender). Eventually, Luan Bu and Cao Qi (曹奇), the Marquess of Pingyang, arrived and defeated the four principalities, but at the same time also discovered that Qi had initially been part of the conspiracy. Unable to explain himself, Prince Jianglü committed suicide, but Emperor Jing, having compassion on him, permitted his son Liu Shou (劉壽) to inherit the principality.

Not so fortunate were the princes of the four rebelling principalities. The general sent to suppress them, Han Tuidang (韓頹當), the Marquess of Gonggao, wrote a letter to Liu Ang, the Prince of Jiaoxi, threatening him with utter destruction if he did not surrender. Prince Ang did so and was allowed to commit suicide. The other three princes were captured and executed. The four principalities were seized by the central government.

The final principality to be destroyed was Zhao. While Li Ji was initially unable to prevail in besieging the Zhao capital of Handan (modern Handan, Hebei), Zhao's hopes were virtually lost when Xiongnu forces, realizing Zhao was about to be defeated, chose not to join in the battle. When Luan returned from Qi he attacked Handan with Li and was able to capture it by breaking a levee to flood the walls of Handan. Liu Sui, the Prince of Zhao, committed suicide.

Liu Zhi, the Prince of Jibei, who initially wished to join the rebellion, did not share their fate. His official Gongsun Huo (公孫獲) was able to persuade Liu Wu, the prince of Liang, that Liu Zhi had only pretended to join the rebellion and had in fact contributed to the rebellion's defeat. With Liu Wu's intercession, Prince Zhi was spared and he was instead given the Principality of Zaichuan.

In all, the initially ferocious rebellion lasted only three months before being defeated.

== Impact ==
Emperor Gaozu had initially created imperial princes with independent military powers with an eye to having them protect the dynasty from outside. By the time of Emperor Jing, however, they were already creating problems by their refusal to follow the imperial government's laws and orders. Had the seven princes prevailed in this conflict, in all likelihood the Han dynasty would have collapsed into a loose confederation of states. In the aftermath of the rebellion, while the principality system was maintained, the powers of the princes were gradually reduced and the sizes of the principalities reduced as well, under Emperor Jing and his son Emperor Wu. With the longevity of the Han dynasty, the Chinese mindset of it being normal to have a unified empire rather than divided states started to settle in.

== See also ==
- Zhuang Ji
