= Jiaoxi Commandery =

Historic commandery of China

Jiaoxi Commandery (Chinese: 膠西郡) was a historical commandery of China, located in what is now eastern Shandong.

The commandery was established in the Qin dynasty. In early Han dynasty, it constituted part of the Qi Kingdom. In 164 BC, Jiaoxi was granted to Liu Ang (劉卬), son of Liu Fei, King of Qi, as a separate kingdom. Ang was killed in the Rebellion of the Seven States, and he was succeeded by Liu Duan (端), son of the reigning Emperor Jing. During Emperor Wu's reign, much of Jiaoxi was revoked for Duan's misdeeds. Duan died in 108 BC without issue, and Jiaoxi again became a commandery administered by the Han central government. In 73 BC, Jiaoxi was granted to Liu Hong (弘), son of King Li of Guangling (廣陵厲王), as the Gaomi Kingdom. His descendants ruled Gaomi for 4 generations:

- Liu Hong (弘), King Ai (哀) of Gaomi, 73–65 BC;
- Liu Zhang (章), King Qing (頃) of Gaomi, 65–31 BC;
- Liu Kuan (寬), King Huai (懷) of Gaomi, 31–20 BC;
- Liu Shen (慎), 20 BC – 8 AD.

The last king of Gaomi was deposed after the usurpation of Wang Mang. In early Eastern Han, the territory was merged into Beihai Commandery.

In late Western Han, it administered 5 counties: Gaomi (高密), Chang'an (昌安), Shiquan (石泉), Yi'an (夷安), and Chengxiang (成鄉). The population was 192,536, or 40,531 households.
