= Liu Pi, Prince of Wu =

Liu Pi

Marquess of Pei
- Tenure: 26 January – 30 November 196 BC

King of Wu
- Reign: 30 November 196–154 BC
- Born: 215 BC
- Died: 154 BC (aged 61)
- Issue: Liu Xian (劉賢), Crown Prince of Wu State; Liu Zihua (劉子華); Liu Ju (劉駒)
Names
- Family name: Liu (劉); Given name: Pi (濞)
- House: House of Liu
- Father: Liu Xi, King Qing of Dai

Liu Pi (simplified Chinese: 刘濞; traditional Chinese: 劉濞; pinyin: Liú Pì; 215–154 BC) was a nephew of Emperor Gaozu of Han, being a son of Liu Xi, Prince Qing of Dai, and appointed Prince of Wu by Emperor Gao. During the reign of Emperor Jing, he initiated the Rebellion of the Seven States to resist the Emperor's centralizing policies, during which he was defeated and killed.

== Biography ==
On 26 January 196 BC, he was made Marquess of Pei at the age of 20. He later demonstrated his combat ability as a cavalry general in the campaign against Ying Bu. On 30 November 196 BC, Emperor Gao promoted Liu Pi to Prince of Wu due to his growing concerns about the Wu provinces.

When Emperor Wen of Han was on the throne, Liu Pi's son Liu Xian and Crown Prince Qi (later Emperor Jing of Han) were involved in a game of Liubo which ended in the two getting into an argument and the crown prince killing Liu Pi's son with the chess board. Out of revenge and reflecting his growing distrust of the Emperor, Liu Pi started building up his wealth and military power within his territory. Emperor Wen believed his son was at fault for Liu Xian's death and did not hold Liu Pi accountable for his aggressive actions.

After Crown Prince Qi became emperor, based on the advice from Chao Cuo, Emperor Jing began to centralize power in an attempt to reduce the strength of the regional princes. In c.February 154 BC, Liu Pi convinced six other princes to rebel against the emperor, thereby starting the Rebellion of the Seven States. The emperor appointed Zhou Yafu as commander and he defeated Liu Pi's army. Liu Pi fled to the Prince of Dongyue, who killed him under the inducement of the imperial court; the kingdom of Wu was later abolished.

Liu Pi House of Liu Born: 216 BC Died: 154 BC
Chinese royalty
New creation	Marquess of Pei; 196 BC – 195 BC	Enfeoffed as King of Wu
Chinese nobility
New creation	King of Wu; 195 BC – 154 BC	Demoted due to Rebellion of the Seven States
