= Jiaodong Kingdom =

Kingdom of the Han dynasty

Location of Jiaodong within Shandong

Jiaodong Kingdom (Chinese: 膠東國) was a kingdom of the Han dynasty, located in what is now eastern Shandong, with its capital in Jimo (the site is in today's Pingdu, not Jimo, Shandong).

== History ==
In 165 BC, Zichuan was separated from the Qi Kingdom and granted to Liu Xiongqu (劉雄渠), son of Liu Fei, King of Qi. Xiongqu was killed in the Rebellion of the Seven States, and was succeeded by Liu Che, son of Emperor Jing, and the future Emperor Wu. After Che was designated as the heir to the Han throne, Jiaodong was converted to a commandery.

In 148 BC, Jiaodong was granted to Liu Ji, another son of Emperor Jing. Ji and his descendants held Jiaodong for 6 generations:

- Liu Ji (劉寄), King Kang (康) of Jiaodong, 148–119 BC;
- Liu Xian (劉賢), King Ai (哀) of Jiaodong, 119–106 BC;
- Liu Tongping (劉通平), King Dai (戴) of Jiaodong, 106–82 BC;
- Liu Yin (劉音), King Qing (頃) of Jiaodong, 82–27 BC;
- Liu Shou (劉授), King Gong (恭) of Jiaodong, 27–14 BC;
- Liu Yin (劉殷), 14 BC – 8 AD.

The last king of Jiaodong was deposed after the usurpation of Wang Mang. After the restoration of Eastern Han, Jiaodong was merged into Beihai Commandery.

In late Western Han, Jiaodong consisted of 8 counties, namely Jimo (即墨), Changwu (昌武), Xiami (下密), Zhuangwu (壯武), Yuzhi (郁秩), Ting (挺), Guanyang (觀陽) and Zoulu (鄒盧). The population in 2 AD was 323,331, or 72,002 households.
