= Jinan Commandery =

Historical commandery of China

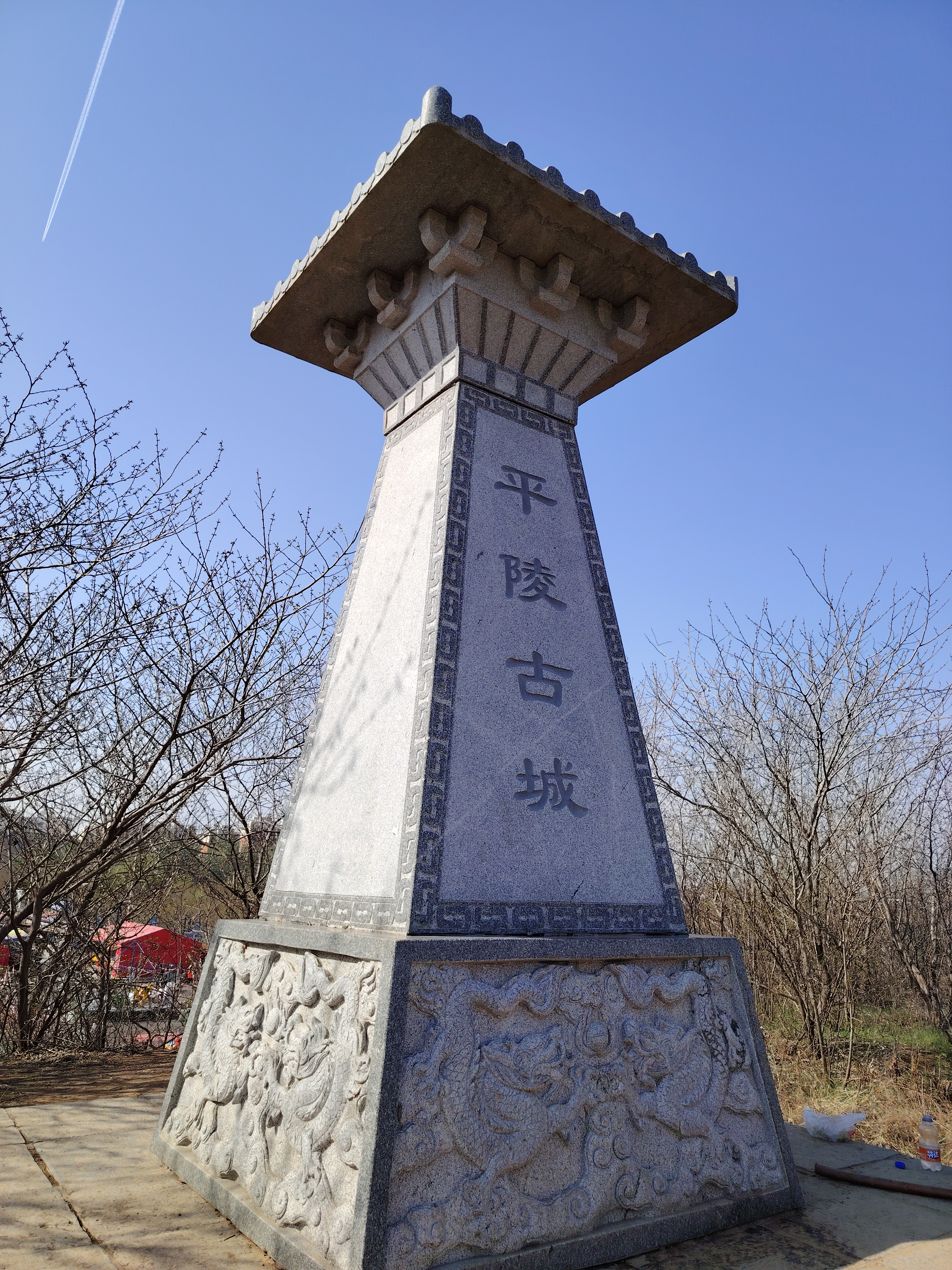
The monument of Dongpingling in Licheng, Jinan, which used to be the administrative center of Jinan Commandery

Jinan Commandery (Chinese: 濟南郡) was a commandery in historical China, located in what is now central Shandong province.

== History ==
Jinan was established in early Western Han dynasty under the Qi Kingdom of Liu Fei, son of Emperor Gaozu. In 165 BC, Liu Ze (劉則), the grandson of Fei and reigning King of Qi, died without issue and the Han court divided the kingdom among the sons of Fei, and Jinan became a short-lived principality ruled by Liu Piguang. During the Rebellion of the Seven States, Piguang was killed, and Jinan was converted to a commandery. In late Western Han dynasty, the commandery consisted of 14 counties and marquessates: Dongpingling (東平陵), Zouping (鄒平), Tai (臺), Liangzou (梁鄒), Tugu (土鼓), Yuling (於陵), Yangqiu (陽丘), Banyang (般陽), Jian (菅), Zhaoyang (朝陽), Licheng (歷城), Xiao (猇), Zhu (著) and Yicheng (宜成). The population in 2 AD was 642,884, in 140,761 households.

For much of Eastern Han, Jinan was a nominal kingdom/principality and served as the fief of various members of the imperial clan, with the first being Liu Kang, son of Emperor Guangwu, in 39 AD. In Cao Wei dynasty, the Prince of Jinan was Cao Kai (曹楷), a grandson of Cao Cao and a son of Cao Zhang, Prince of Rencheng. Jinan reverted to a commandery after the foundation of Western Jin. In 140 AD, the territory consisted of 10 counties, including Dongpingling, Zhu, Yuling, Tai, Jian, Tugu, Liangzou, Zouping, Dongzhaoyang (東朝陽) and Licheng. The population in 140 AD was 453,308, in 78,544 households.

The commandery was conquered by Northern Wei in early Northern and Southern Dynasties period, during Emperor Ming of Song's reign. The commandery then consisted of 6 counties, namely Licheng, Zhaoyang, Zhu, Tugu, Fengling (逢陵) and Pingling (平陵). The Book of Song recorded a population of 38,175 in 5,056 households, while the Book of Wei recorded a population of 68,820 in 20,017 households. The commandery was abolished in early Sui dynasty.

== Princes of Jinan ==
- Liu Piguang (劉辟光), 164–154 BC;
- Liu Kang (劉康), Prince An (安) of Jinan, 41–99;
- Liu Cuo (劉錯), Prince Jian (簡) of Jinan, 99–105;
- Liu Xiang (劉香), Prince Xiao (孝) of Jinan, 105–125;
- Liu Xian (劉顯), Prince Li (釐) of Jinan, 125–128;
- Liu Guang (劉廣), Prince Dao (悼) of Jinan, 129–153;
- Liu Kang (劉康), 174–?;
- Liu Yun (劉贇), ?–207;
- Liu Kai (劉開), 207–220;
- Cao Kai (曹楷), 246–265.
