= Zhang Ao =

Feudal lord of Han dynasty (died 182 BC)

Zhang Ao 張敖 (Chinese)

King of Zhao (趙王)
- Tenure: c. September 202 BC – c. February 198 BC
- Predecessor: Zhang Er
- Successor: Liu Ruyi

Marquis of Xuanping (宣平侯)
- Tenure: c. February 198 BC – 182 BC
- Died: 182 BC
- Spouse: Princess Luyuan
- Issue: Zhang Yǎn; Zhang Shou; Zhang Chi; Zhang Yān
Posthumous name
- Wu (武)
- Dynasty: Han Dynasty
- Father: Zhang Er

Zhang Ao (simplified Chinese: 张敖; traditional Chinese: 張敖; pinyin: Zhāng Áo; died 182 BC) was one of the feudal lords after the end of the Qin dynasty in 206 BC.

== Life ==
Zhang Ao was the son of Zhang Er, posthumously known as King Jing of Zhao (趙景王). Zhang Ao participated in his father's campaigns against the last armies of the Qin. During this time, rebel leader Chen Sheng granted him the title of Lord of Chengdu (成都君). The hegemon king Xiang Yu of Western Chu made Zhang Er king of Changshan (常山王) during the Eighteen Kingdoms Period, but Zhang Er changed his loyalty to Liu Bang, the eventual founder of the Han dynasty, and was appointed King of Zhao. In 202 BC, Zhang Er died and Zhang Ao succeeded him to the throne of Zhao. He married Liu Bang and Empress Lü's daughter, Princess Yuan of Lu (posthumous title), who would later predecease him.

In 200 BC, Liu Bang passed by Zhang Ao's domain and paid him a visit, during which Zhang Ao personally served him with great deference, even though Liu Bang treated him rudely. Guan Gao (贯高) and Zhao Wu (趙午), both Zhang Ao's retainers, were dismayed by Zhang Ao's apparent cowardice and urged him to allow them to murder Liu Bang on his behalf in order to preserve his honor. Zhang Ao refused to grant such permission, though this did not stop the plot.

Zhang Ao
- Traditional Chinese: 張敖
- Simplified Chinese: 张敖
Transcriptions
Standard Mandarin
- Hanyu Pinyin: Zhāng Áo
- Wade–Giles: Chang Ao

In 199 BC, Liu Bang passed by Zhang Ao's domain once again. Guan Gao and his accomplices set up an ambush at an inn that Liu Bang had intended to stay in, but Liu Bang, in an apparent moment of premonition, chose to pass by without staying. In the next year, one of Guan Gao's enemies caught wind of the plot and reported it to the imperial court, which promptly arrested Zhang Ao, Guan Gao, and the others involved.

Upon Guan Gao's pleading and further investigation, it was revealed that Zhang Ao was not involved in the assassination plot, so he was pardoned and only demoted to Marquis of Xuanping (宣平侯). The emperor pardoned Guan Gao for his loyalty, but he, seeing that his final worth was to exonerate his master and that it had been accomplished, killed himself.

== Legacy ==
Zhang Ao died during the reign of Empress Lü (r. 188–180 BC) and received the posthumous title of Marquis Wu (武侯). His di son Zhang Yǎn (張偃), being also the grandson of Empress Lü, was granted the title of King of Luyuan (魯元王) after the title of Yan's mother Princess Luyuan. Zhang Shou (張壽) and Zhang Chi (張侈), Zhang Ao's sons born to concubines, were given the titles Marquis of Lechang (樂昌侯) and Marquis of Xingdu (信都侯), respectively. All three of them had their titles taken away after the Lü Clan disturbance, though Zhang Yan was given the title of Marquis of Nangong (南宫侯) upon the accession of Emperor Wen. The title of King of Zhao had been given to Liu Bang's young son Liu Ruyi in 198 BC, when it was taken away from Zhang Ao.

Zhang Ao's daughter Zhang Yān became the wife of Emperor Hui (r. 195–188 BC), her uncle of her mother's side.
