= Lü Clan disturbance =

Chinese political upheaval in 180 BCE

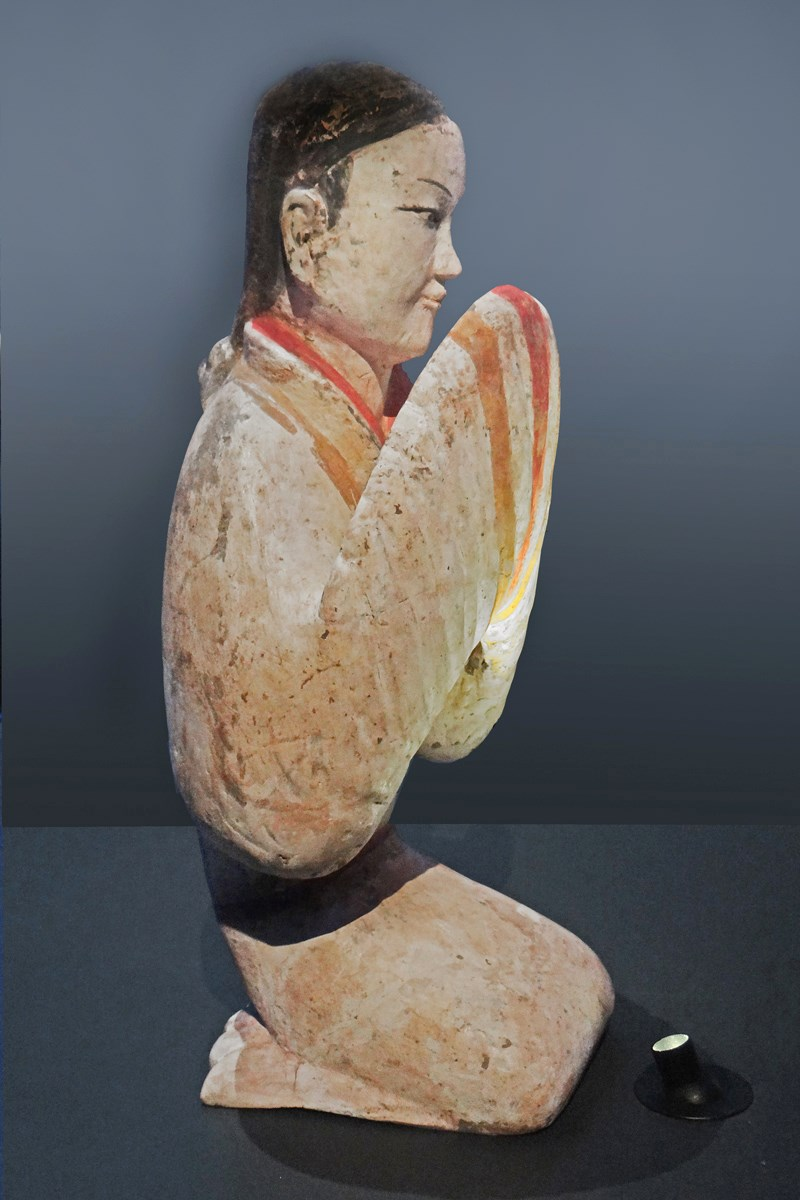
A Western Han (202 BCE – 9 CE) ceramic statuette of a seated female court attendant holding up her robes, from a tomb of Xianyang, Shaanxi province

The Lü Clan disturbance (Chinese: 呂氏之亂; pinyin: Lǚ shì zhī luàn, 180 BCE) refers to a political upheaval after the death of Empress Lü Zhi of the early Han dynasty. In the aftermath, her clan of Lü (呂) were deposed from their seats of power and exterminated, Emperor Houshao was deposed and Emperor Wen acceded the throne. The term "Lü Clan disturbance" also sometimes encompasses the prior period of total domination of the political scene by Empress Lü Zhi and her family after the death of her son Emperor Hui.

== Emperor Gaozu's death and Empress Lü Zhi in power ==
When Ying Bu rebelled in August or September 196 bCE, Emperor Gaozu of Han personally led the troops against Ying and suffered an arrow wound which allegedly led to his death the following year. His heir apparent Liu Ying took the throne and is posthumously known as Emperor Hui of Han (r. 195–188 bce). Shortly afterward, Gaozu's widow Empress Lü – now empress dowager – had two of her opponents murdered. Liu Ruyi, a potential claimant to the throne, was poisoned. His mother, Lady Qi, was mutilated and publicly humiliated before being killed. When the teenage Emperor Hui discovered his mother's cruel deeds, Loewe says that he "did not dare disobey her." From that point, Emperor Hui only "indulged himself with wine and women" and no longer made key governing decisions, leaving them to his mother.

== Emperor Hui's death and Empress Lü's seizing control ==
When Emperor Hui died in the autumn of 188 BCE, his son (whose parentage is disputed) ascended to the throne as Emperor Qianshao. There was no pretension that he was actually in charge: Emperor Hui's mother Empress Dowager Lü maintained control of the imperial court. With Empress Dowager Lü acting as regent, she was the one who exercised the power of the emperor and decided who bore that title, rendering the identity of the emperor rather meaningless. The Book of Han describes her as "presiding over court and issuing edicts" (臨朝稱制; lín cháo chēngzhì).

In the winter of 188 BCE, Empress Lü decided to elevate her brothers as princes, despite Emperor Gaozu's ruling that only members of the imperial Liu clan could be ennobled as princes— a ruling that Empress Lü had a hand in creating. She was opposed by Chancellor of the Right Wang Ling (zh:王陵 (西汉)) but was supported by Chancellor of the Left Chen Ping and the commander-in-chief of the armed forces, Marshal of State Zhou Bo. When Wang criticized Chen and Zhou in private for contravening Gaozu's edict, they claimed that their compliance with Empress Dowager Lü's position was necessary to protect the empire and the Liu family.

Empress Dowager Lü then appointed Wang Ling to the position of Grand Tutor (太傅; tàifù)— the emperor's teacher. Nominally a promotion, this appointment would have the effect of removing Wang from court. He declined, claiming illness, and Lü removed him from his position as Chancellor, sending him away from the capital to his fief of Anguo (安國, in modern Baoding, Hebei). She promoted Chen Ping to Chancellor of the Right, and promoted Superintendent of State Visits Shen Yiji (zh:審食其) to the office of Chancellor of the Left. Shen is described as a favoured servant of the empress, and romantic connection between the two was rumoured.

Empress Dowager Lü then followed through on her intent to ennoble her kin. In the summer of 187 BCE, her daughter Princess Yuan of Lu died. Afterwards, the princess's son, Zhang Yan (zh:張偃), was created Prince of Lu on Empress Lü's orders. Zhang Yan's father Zhang Ao had been Prince of Zhao during Gaozu's reign, and had been demoted as part of the policy against non-Liu princes, so this first ennoblement could be seen as a return to older forms.

One month later, she required the emperor's officials to formally petition her to make her nephew Lü Tai (zh:呂台) Prince of Lü – carving the principality out from the Principality of Qi. Continuing to consolidate her family's power, she arranged the marriage of Lü Lu's daughter to Liu Zhang, a grandson of Gaozu by descent from a different consort. She subsequently created Lu Zhang Marquess of Zhuxu (朱虛, present-day Linqu County, Shandong). The empress then enfeoffed a further two nephews to different ranks of marquess.

In 184 bce, in an action unprecedented under the traditional patriarchy, Empress Lü ennobled her younger sister Lü Xu (zh:呂嬃; wife of Fan Kuai) as a marquise. In the spring of 181 BCE, Lü Tai's son Lü Chan (zh:呂產), who had become Prince of Lü after his father's death, was given the larger Principality of Liang. He remained in the imperial court in Chang'an to serve as Grand Tutor and assist Empress Dowager Lü. Later that year, the empress made her nephew Lü Lu (zh:呂祿) Prince of Zhao and another son of Lü Tai's, Lü Tong (zh:呂通 (西汉)), Prince of Yan. Three more nephews were ennobled as marquesses.

== Death of Empress Dowager Lü ==
In the summer of 180 BCE, Empress Dowager Lü Zhi died, having elevated ten relatives to noble ranks of prince or marquess, an assault against the power of the royal house. Immediately before her death, she had put Lü Lu and Lü Chan in charge both of the imperial guards – Lü Lu in charge of the stronger northern division and Lü Chan in charge of the weaker southern division – and also the government. After her death, it was alleged that the Lü clan had a plan to overthrow the Han dynasty and assume imperial power themselves. Purportedly, this plan was leaked to Liu Zhang, the Marquess of Zhuxu and grandson of Emperor Gao through his oldest son Liu Fei (劉肥), who had married a daughter of Lü Lu and who had learned of the scheme from his wife. Liu Zhang then planned a rebellion with his younger brother Liu Xingju, the Marquess of Dongmou, and their older brother Liu Xiang, the Prince of Qi. Under their plan, Liu Xiang would lead Qi forces against the capital, while Liu Zhang and Liu Xingju would persuade the imperial guards to rise up against the Lüs. If they were successful, they intended to have Liu Xiang declared emperor.

== Coup d'état against the Lüs and their destruction ==
However, everything did not go to plan. In the autumn of 180 BCE, Liu Xiang did indeed start a military campaign with his own forces and also gained the support of the nearby Principality of Langye. Lü Chan sent Guan Ying (灌嬰), the Marquess of Yingyin (潁陰), against the Qi forces, but Guan actually distrusted the Lüs more than Qi, and was unwilling to fight the Qi forces. He negotiated a secret armistice with Liu Xiang, and both armies halted some distance apart from each other.

Allegedly, at this time, the Lü clan was ready to take over the imperial dynasty but did not do so because they were concerned at the reactions of Zhou Bo, Liu Zhang, and the principalities of Qi and Chu. While the crisis was forming in Xi'an, a new conspiracy was formed in response, involving:

- Liu Zhang, royal house, potential imperial claimant
- Liu Xingju, royal house
- Zhou Bo (who, despite his title as commander of the armed forces, did not actually have control of the armed forces in the capital)
- Chen Ping (who, also despite his title as prime minister, did not have actual control over the capital bureaucracy)
- Guan Ying, former marshal and prime minister
- Cao Qu (zh:曹窟), the Marquess of Pingyang and son of Cao Can (曹參), a former prime minister
- Li Ji (zh:酈寄), the son of Li Shang, the Marquess of Quzhou and the best friend of Lü Lu
- Ji Tong (紀通), the Marquess of Xiangping
- Liu Jie (zh:劉揭), the Minister of Vassal Affairs.

The conspirators first attempted to get the Lüs to give up power voluntarily. Li Ji persuaded Lü Lu that the best course of action for him and Lü Chan was to return to their principalities and give power to Zhou Bo and Chen Ping, the two highest ranking government officials. Lü Lu agreed but was unable to reach a consensus with the Lü clan elders.

The conspirators then took drastic actions. Ji Tong issued a forged imperial edict, ordering the northern division of the imperial guards to be turned over to Zhou. When the edict arrived at the northern division's camp, Li Ji and Liu Jie convinced Lü Lu that the edict was genuine and that he should obey it, which he did. After requiring the guards to affirm their loyalty to the imperial Liu clan, Zhou Bo took over the northern division.

The conspirators then moved against Lü Chan, who had not known of the change in authority over the capital garrison. While he was trying to enter the imperial palace (alleged by the conspirators later to be preparing for the takeover), Liu Zhang and Cao Qu took control of the gates of the palace and had Lü Chan and his guards confined to the courtyard. Zhou Bo sent some soldiers to Liu Zhang, who fought with Lü Chan's guards and killed him in battle. Over the next few days, each member of the Lü clan was executed regardless of age or gender.

== Emperor Wen's accession to the throne ==
The conspirators argued that their actions were justified in order to protect Emperor Houshao against the Lü conspiracy, but once the Lüs were killed, the conspirators claimed that neither the emperor nor his brothers were in fact Emperor Hui's sons. Rather, they suggested that Empress Zhang Yan, Emperor Hui's wife, had stolen and adopted the boys at Empress Dowager Lü's instigation. They also admitted that they were concerned about reprisals when Emperor Houshao and his brothers grew up. They then agreed to depose Emperor Houshao and invite an imperial prince, not from Emperor Hui's line, to be the new emperor.

As to which prince to be the new emperor, some of the conspirators suggested that Liu Xiang, being the eldest Di son (嫡長子) of Emperor Gao's oldest son (thus the eldest grandson of Emperor Gao), was the obvious choice. Most of the important officials disagreed with this suggestion. They were concerned that Liu Xiang's uncle Si Jun (驷均) was a dominating figure, and if Liu Xiang were to become emperor they would have a repeat of the Lü clan situation. They believed that Emperor Gao's oldest surviving son, 23-year-old Prince Liu Heng of Dai, was the better choice, because he was known to be filial and tolerant, and because his mother Consort Bo's family was known to be careful and kind. Messengers discreetly carried the invitation to Prince Heng, asking him to be the new emperor.

Prince Heng's advisors were suspicious of this invitation. Apparently, they felt that the massacre of the Lü clan was unjustified, and were concerned that the officials intended to make Prince Heng a puppet, ready to take real power themselves. One advisor, Song Chang (zh:宋昌), dissented. He believed that the supporters of the Han dynasty and would not tolerate a takeover, and that given that there were many other principalities outside the capital, the officials would be unable to usurp imperial power even if they wanted to. Still uncertain, Prince Heng sent his uncle Bo Zhao (zh:薄昭) to Chang'an to meet with Marshal Zhou, who guaranteed that the officials were sincere in their invitation and had no ulterior motive. The uncle believed this and urged Prince Heng to accept the offer.

Prince Heng then headed to Chang'an. During an evening ceremony, Prime Minister Chen led the officials in offering the throne to Prince Heng. After declining the customary three times, plus an extraordinary fourth time, Prince Heng accepted the offer, formally ascending the throne as Emperor of China. That same night, Liu Xingju evicted Emperor Houshao from the imperial palace, and into the palace with great pomp the officials welcomed the new emperor (posthumously named Emperor Wen of Han).

== Implications ==
Overall, the Lü Clan Disturbance had positive effects for the nascent Han dynasty. It affirmed that power would rest with the emperor. More importantly, Emperor Wen became an effective and diligent ruler. The stable reigns of Emperor Wen and his son Emperor Jing were generally regarded as one of the golden ages of Chinese history. The Lü clan disturbance and subsequent fate of the Lü clan has often been used throughout Chinese history as a warning to the families of empresses not to assume too much power, and to emperors not to allow them to do so.

== General references ==
- Sima Qian; Sima Tan (1959) [90s BCE]. 9: 呂太后本紀. Records of the Grand Historian 史記. Zhonghua Shuju.
- Ban Gu; Ban Zhao; Ban Biao (1962) [111]. 3: 高后紀. Book of Han 漢書. Zhonghua Shuju.
