= Guan Ying =

Han dynasty general and official (died 176 BCE)

- 灌嬰

Chancellor
- In office 177–176 BC
- Monarch: Emperor Wen of Han
- Preceded by: Zhou Bo
- Succeeded by: Zhang Cang

Personal details
- Born: Unknown; Shangqiu, Henan
- Died: c.January 176 BC
- Occupation: Military general, politician
- Posthumous name: Marquis Yi (懿侯)
- Peerage: Marquis of Yingyin (潁陰侯)

Guan Ying (died c. January 176 BC), posthumously known as Marquis Yi of Yingyin, was a Chinese military general and politician who served as a chancellor of the early Han dynasty.

== Life ==
Guan Ying was from Suiyang (睢陽), which is present-day Shangqiu, Henan. He served under Liu Bang, the founding emperor of the Han dynasty, and had fought for Liu Bang in battles during the rebellion against the Qin dynasty and during the Chu–Han Contention (206–202 BC) against his rival Xiang Yu.

After Liu Bang became emperor and established the Han dynasty, Guan Ying served as General of Chariots and Cavalry (車騎將軍). He put down Chen Xi's rebellion and killed Hou Chang (侯敞), one of Chen Xi's lieutenants, in battle near Quni (曲逆; around 20 miles or 32 kilometers west of present-day Baoding, Hebei) in 196 BC.

When Liu Bang died in 195 BC, his empress Lü Zhi became empress dowager while their son Liu Ying (Emperor Hui), ruled as a puppet emperor under her control. Lü Zhi and her clan seized power from the Lius and dominated the political scene; this period, lasting about 15 years, ended in a coup which was historically known as the Lü Clan disturbance.

After Lü Zhi died in August 180 BC, Liu Xiang, one of Liu Bang's grandsons, and others led a rebellion against the Lü-controlled Han government to restore the Lius to power. Guan Ying was appointed General-in-Chief (大將軍) by the Lü-controlled Han government and ordered to lead troops to suppress the revolt. However, he led his men to combine forces with Zhou Bo, Chen Ping and others who were loyal to the Lius and joined them in ousting the Lüs from power. In the end, the Lü clan was exterminated and Liu Heng (Emperor Wen), one of Liu Bang's sons, became the new emperor.

During Emperor Wen's reign, Guan Ying served as Grand Commandant (太尉) and later succeeded Zhou Bo as Chancellor. He died in office after about a year and was given the posthumous name "Marquis Yi" (懿侯).
