= Zhang Cang =

Zhang Cang 張蒼 (253–152 BC) was a Chinese military general, philosopher, and politician during the Western Han dynasty. He was the representative thinker of the Yin-Yang School, as well as a Confucian scholar, army general and prime-minister under Liu Bang (Han Gaozu, the founder of the Han dynasty). Evidence on his life is contained in the Book of Han and some other sources.

== Early life ==
Zhang Cang was born in Yangwu 陽武 (present day Yuanyang, Henan Province).

In his youth, Zhang studied in Xun Kuang's circle, which was known for teaching prominent figures such as Han Fei and Li Si. When the state of Qin conquered other vassal states of the Zhou dynasty, he came to Qin's capital Xianyang and became an official to manage the imperial books. During the rule of Er Shi huang, Zhang Cang broke the imperial law and fled to his hometown. At that time, people, and the nobles of the former six vassal states rose up against the Qin's rule. Liu Bang, a general from Chu, was ordered by King Huai of Chu to lead his army westward. Zhang Cang enrolled Liu Bang's troops upon their passing of Yangwu.

== Military career ==
Zhang Cang became a general in Liu Bang's army and arrived in Nanyang. When the Chu troops attacked Nanyang, Zhang's misbehavior became the reason for his condemnation to death. However, he was saved by Wang Ling (王陵), an old friend of Liu Bang and the commander-in-chief, who later succeeded Cao Can on the post of prime minister of the Han Empire. Zhang Cang appreciated Wang Ling greatly from that day on, and regarded him as his father. Later on, after becoming the prime minister, Zhang would always visit Wang Ling's residence after court meeting to care Wang Ling's wife as his mother after Wang Ling died. According to the Book of Han, Wang Ling saw the stripped Zhang Cang on the spot of execution and wondered at his impressively tall and beautiful body and persuaded Liu Bang to spare Zhang.

In BC 206, Liu Bang was named King of Han by Xiang Yu, another Chu general and claimant on the succession of the rule in China and Liu Bang's future arch-rival. Liu Bang went to Han, his kingdom. Zhang Cang followed him and went to Hanzhong. Some months late, some former generals who had no gains from Xiang Yu's post-war arrangement rebelled (cf. Tian Rong and his activity in reestablishing the unified Kingdom of Qi, despite Xiang Yu's will). Xiang Yu drove Emperor Yi of Chu, the lord to all the kings in name, to Chen (modern Chenzhou, Hunan Province), and then ordered King of Jiujiang and King of Linjiang secretly to murder the Emperor Yi.

Liu Bang was also unsatisfied with Xiang Yu. After Xiang Yu went eastward to Pengcheng (modern Xuzhou, Jiangsu Province), he conquered three kingdoms in modern Shaanxi which Xiang Yu founded. Then Han's troops matched eastward and the small kingdoms between Han and Chu surrendered to Han troops and joined the war against Xiang Yu's West Chu. Zhang Cang was one of the generals. Liu Bang ordered his generals to attack West Wei, Zhao and Dai. The three kingdoms were conquered, their kings surrendered or killed. Liu Bang nominated Zhang Er as the King of Zhao, and Zhang Cang as the Prime Minister to Zhang Er. Then Zhang Cang was changed as the governor of Dai, and then as the Prime Minister when Dai became a kingdom.

Zhang Cang finished his military career after Han Empire put down the rebellion of King Yan.

== Political career ==
For his merits, Zhang Cang was titled Marquis of Beiping. When Xiao He became the empire's prime minister, Zhang Cang was appointed as the Minister of Audit, working as assistant to Prime Minister, because of his expertise in mathematics and music.

In 195 BC, Ying Bu the King of Huainan Kingdom rose up against Han Empire and soon was defeated and killed, Liu Bang nominated his youngest son Liu Chang as the King of Huainan Kingdom. Zhang Cang was appointed as the Prime Minister of Huainan. In 181, Zhang Cang came back to Chang'an, the capital of Han Empire, and took the position of Yushi Daifu, the vice Prime Minister and the Supreme Justice of the Empire. The next year, as the member of the clique of meritorious generals and minister, Zhang Cang took part in the coup d'état against Empress Dowager Lü and extinguished the Lü's family as soon as she died. Then Zhang Cang also took part in electing Liu Heng the King of Dai Kingdom as the future Emperor.

In BC176, Guan Ying died, and Zhang Cang succeeded to his position of Prime Minister of the Empire; staying in the position for more than ten years. At the end of rule of Emperor Xiaowen (Liu Heng), he participated in the cosmological argument concerning the position of the Han dynasty in correlation with the wu xing. Some scholars thought the Han dynasty corresponded to Earth, and must change the color of emperor and minister's uniforms into yellow. Meanwhile, the right correlate was Water, and so the empire must continue to use black as the noblest color as usual. The current correlate was established by Zhang Cang upon the foundation of the empire. However, a yellow dragon was found in Chengji (modern Gansu Province) was used as an argument against his theory. Correspondingly, the Emperor established a new era, to Zhang's discontent. As a result, Zhang Cang resigned his post saying that he was enough old and ill.

Zhang Cang died in 152 BC, being more than 100 years of age. He was given the posthumous title "Wen" (文), and entered history as Marquis Wen of Beiping.

== Scholarly legacy ==
Zhang Cang is described as a prominent master of the calendar and music theory of his time, making great contributions to System Construction of the Han dynasty according to Sima Qian's record. Zhang Cang is regarded as the representative of Yin-Yang School; his writings edited into the book bearing his name.

It is believed that The Nine Chapters on the Mathematical Art, the most important book in early history of Chinese mathematics, was edited by him.

Zhang Cang was also a representative Confucian scholar of the transition period from the Warring States to Han. Kong Yingda (574 – 648) names him as recipient of Xunzi's transmission of the Zuo Zhuan (The Zuo Commentary to the Spring and Autumn Chronicle) His expertise in the Zuo Zhuan did not constitute the mainstream in the field, since the Zuo Commentary was related to the Old Text school, while in his time the New Text school was more popular (see New Text Confucianism).

Being a student of Xunzi, he transmitted his teaching to Jia Yi.

== Position career ==
Preceded by Guan Ying	Han dynasty Prime Minister	Succeeded by Shentu Jia
