= Empress Lu (disambiguation) =

Empress Lü (呂雉, 241–180 BC), of the Han dynasty, was the first empress in Chinese history.

Empress Lu or Empress Lü may also refer to:

- Empress Lü (Houshao) (呂皇后, died 180 BC), wife of Emperor Houshao of Han, also a grandniece of Empress Lü Zhi
- Empress Lu (Liu Song dynasty) (路皇后, fl. 465), wife of Emperor Qianfei of Liu Song
- Empress Lu (Tang dynasty) (陸皇后, fl. 710), wife of Emperor Shang of Tang
