= Empress Lü (Houshao) =

Empress of China in 180 BC

Empress Lü (Chinese: 呂皇后, personal name unknown) (died c. 180 BCE) was an empress during the Han dynasty.

Lady Lü was the daughter of Lü Lu (呂祿), the son of Lü Shizhi (吕释之)—the elder brother of the powerful Grand Empress Dowager Lü Zhi, who was the true power at the time even though her grandson Emperor Houshao (Liu Hong) was the titular emperor. As Grand Empress Dowager Lü grew sick in 180 BC, she put Lü Lu (along with her other nephew Lü Chan (呂產), son of Lü Ze (吕泽), her elder brother) in charge of Emperor Houshao's regency, and married Lady Lü to Emperor Houshao.

When the Lü clan was later destroyed that year, in the Lü Clan disturbance, Emperor Houshao was deposed and executed. Historians implied that Empress Lü was also executed, although her fate was not explicitly stated.

Chinese royalty
Preceded by Empress Zhang Yan	Empress of the Western Han dynasty 180 BC	Succeeded by Empress Dou
