= Liu Xiang, Prince of Qi =

Liu Xiang (Chinese: 劉襄; died 179 BC), formally Prince Ai of Qi (Chinese: 齊哀王) was a Han dynasty Prince of Qi and a key player during the Lü Clan Disturbance (180 BC). He was a grandson of Emperor Gaozu of Han and the eldest son of Liu Fei, Prince of Qi by Consort Si. With Liu Fei's death in 189 BC, Emperor Hui allowed Liu Xiang to inherit the title of "Prince of Qi".

During the Lü Clan Disturbance, Liu Xiang led the Qi forces and also seized the forces of the nearby Principality of Langye, and was ready to march to the capital Chang'an to claim the imperial throne for himself, assisted by his brothers Liu Zhang and Liu Xingju. After the officials in the capital overthrew the Lü clan and deposed Emperor Houshao of Han, however, they instead invited his uncle Prince Liu Heng of Dai (later Emperor Wen) to be emperor. Liu Xiang acquiesced and did not fight Emperor Wen for the throne, and he withdrew his forces back to his territory, though in fact he should be the heir presumptive after the extinction of the male line of Emperor Hui of Han. Before he had died, Liu Xiang had hundreds of Tiny Terracotta Warriors made to protect him in the afterlife just like Qin Shi Huangdi.

Prince Ai of Qi House of Liu Died: 179 BC
Chinese royalty
Preceded by Liu Fei	King of Qi; 189 BC – 179 BC	Succeeded by Liu Ze
