= Ji Bu =

Chinese military general

- Born: Unknown; Xiaxiang (present-day Sucheng District, Suqian, Jiangsu
- Died: Unknown
- Occupation: General

Ji Bu (季布; fl. 200s BC) was a Chinese military general from late Qin to the early Western Han dynasty. He was from Xiaxiang (下相; present-day Sucheng District, Suqian, Jiangsu). He previously served under Xiang Yu, a warlord who engaged Liu Bang (Emperor Gaozu), the founder of the Han dynasty, in a four-year-long power struggle historically known as the Chu–Han Contention (206–202 BC). After Xiang Yu's defeat and death, Ji Bu became a fugitive of the Han Empire and had a price placed on his head by Emperor Gaozu. However, the emperor eventually pardoned him after being persuaded by Xiahou Ying and recruited him to serve in the Han government as a "Palace Assistant" (郎中). He was promoted to the position of "General of the Household" (中郎將) after Emperor Hui ascended the throne, and was appointed as the Administrator (郡守) of Hedong Commandery during the reign of Emperor Wen.

== Anecdote ==
The Chinese idiom "yi nuo qian jin" (一諾千金), literally "a promise, a thousand jin of gold", which is used to describe a kept promise, was derived from an anecdote about Ji Bu. There was one Cao Qiusheng (曹丘生), who was from the same hometown as Ji Bu, and he was known for bragging and trying to build relations with the wealthy and powerful. When Ji Bu heard that Cao had befriended Dou Zhangjun, he wrote to Dou to discourage him from maintaining a friendship with Cao. At the same time, Cao asked Dou to help him write a letter to formally introduce him to Ji Bu, but Dou told him that Ji Bu disliked him and advised him not to meet Ji Bu. After Cao insisted, Dou wrote to Ji Bu, who was displeased when he received the letter. Later, when Cao finally met Ji Bu, he said, "The people of Chu have a saying: 'a hundred jin of gold is nothing compared to a promise from Ji Bu.' Why do you think you have such a good reputation? I see you as my fellow townsman, so I have been helping to spread your good name around. Why do you look down on me?" Upon hearing that, Ji Bu changed his attitude towards Cao and treated him better.
