= Princess Yuan of Lu =

Han Dynasty princess (died 187 BC)

- Born: c. 217 BCE
- Died: May 187 BCE (aged 29-30)
- Burial: Anling
- Spouse: Zhang Ao, Prince of Zhao
- Issue: Empress Xiaohui; Zhang Yan, Marquis of Nangong
- House: House of Liu (by birth); House of Zhang (by marriage)
- Father: Emperor Gaozu of Han
- Mother: Empress Lü Zhi

Princess Yuan of Lu
- Traditional Chinese: 魯元公主
- Simplified Chinese: 鲁元公主
Transcriptions
Standard Mandarin
- Hanyu Pinyin: Lǔ Yuán Gōngzhǔ

Princess Yuan of Lu (魯元公主), personal name unknown, also called Princess Lu Yuan (late 3rd-century BC – c. May 187 BC), was the eldest daughter of the Han dynasty's founder Emperor Gaozu and Empress Lü Zhi. She had one daughter who was married to her younger brother, Emperor Hui.

== Biography ==
Lu Yuan's exact birth date is unknown, but her appearance in official records suggests that she was born before 211 BC. She was born before her father Liu Bang became a serious political contender, after which most of her early life was spent avoiding capture by enemy forces.

In 204 BC, during the Chu–Han Contention, the carriage of Lu Yuan and her brother Liu Ying was pursued by forces of the Chu State. Duke Teng, a member of the Xiahou family, ordered the two to leave the carriage and replaced them with two decoy travellers to allow them to escape.

Liu Bang was proclaimed Emperor Gaozu of the Han dynasty in 202 BC. Lu Yuan's mother Empress Lü Zhi had little power after her husband became emperor and was powerless to prevent Emperor Gaozu from planning to marry Lu Yuan, as the daughter of the legitimate wife, to a Xiongnu leader to prevent the nomads from causing trouble on the northern border. However, Lu Yuan was married in 202 BC to Zhang Ao, the King of Zhao. Their daughter Zhang Yan was married to Lu Yuan's younger brother Liu Ying in c. November 192 BC, as part of their mother's attempts to control the imperial household.

In c. December 194 BC, King Daohui of Qi presented Chengyang Commandery to Lu Yuan and honoured her as Queen dowager.

== Burial ==
Lu Yuan is buried in the Anling mausoleum group near Xianyang, alongside her brother, daughter and husband. Her tomb is larger than that of her husband.

== Media ==
- Lu Yuan is one of the characters of the 2010 Chinese TV series Beauty's Rival in Palace. She is portrayed by Lü Jiarong.
