= Zhai Gong =

Chinese politician

Zhai Gong (Chinese: 翟公, fl. 2nd century BCE) was a magistrate under the Emperor Wen of the Han dynasty of China.

Gong was a native of Xiagui (下邽), Shaanxi. He was considered a popular politician until his dismissal from office. Upon his reinstatement, Gong's friends tried to come back, but he denied them. He posted a notice to the effect that true friendship endures even through poverty and disgrace.
