= Zhang Yan (empress) =

Empress of Han China from 192 to 188 BC

- Empress of the Han dynasty

Empress of the Han dynasty
- Tenure: 192–188 BC
- Predecessor: Empress Lü
- Successor: Empress Lü (Houshao)
- Born: 202 BC?
- Died: April or May 163 BC (aged 38-39)
- Spouse: Emperor Hui of Han
Names
- Zhang Yan
Posthumous name
- Empress Xiaohui (孝惠皇后)
- Father: Zhang Ao, Prince of Zhao
- Mother: Princess Yuan of Lu

Zhang Yan (Note: Lady Zhang's name was not recorded in official histories. The name "Yan" was found in Shiji Suoyin by Sima Zhen, citing Huangfu Mi.) (traditional Chinese: 張嫣; simplified Chinese: 张嫣; pinyin: Zhāng Yān; died April or May 163 BC), known as Empress Xiaohui (孝惠皇后) posthumously, (Note: During her time, empresses did not have their own posthumous names.) was an empress during the Han dynasty. She was a daughter of Princess Yuan of Lu (the only daughter of Emperor Gao (Liu Bang) and his wife Empress Lü) and Princess Yuan's husband Zhang Ao (son of Zhang Er), the Prince of Zhao and later Marquess of Xuanping.

== Biography ==
In c.November 192 BC, at the insistence of then-Empress Dowager Lü, Lady Yan married her uncle Emperor Hui, the son of Emperor Gao and Empress Dowager Lü, and she was created empress. The marriage was a childless one. At Empress Dowager Lü's instruction, Empress Zhang took several male children as her own and killed their mothers. (Whether these children were Emperor Hui's is a matter of controversy, although it appears likely that they were Emperor Hui's children by his concubines.)

When Emperor Hui died in September 188 BC at the age of 22, one of the children that Empress Zhang adopted became emperor (as Emperor Qianshao), but Grand Empress Dowager Lü had effective total control of the imperial government. Empress Zhang, was not made empress dowager as this title was retained by Empress Dowager Lü who never claimed the title Grand Empress Dowager and did not appear to have significant influence. Nevertheless, when Emperor Qianshao found out in 184 BC that he was not actually her child, he made a careless comment that he would take vengeance on her—at which Empress Dowager Lü had him deposed and executed, and replaced him with his brother Liu Hong (as Emperor Houshao), who was also adopted by Empress Zhang. It was during Emperor Qianshao's reign that Empress Zhang's brother Zhang Yan (Chinese: 張偃; pinyin: Zhāng Yǎn—notice difference in tone) was created the Prince of Lu.

After Empress Dowager Lü died in August 180 BC, and the Lü clan overthrown and slaughtered by the officials opposed to the Lüs in the Lü Clan Disturbance, Emperor Houshao was deposed and killed. Empress Zhang was not killed, but she was put under house arrest in a palace to the north after being deposed from her position as empress and henceforth referred to as Empress Hui. Her brother, the Prince of Lu, was also deposed and reduced in rank to Marquess of Nangong. After this no records exist of her later life until her death. Empress Zhang died in 163 BC and was buried with her husband of merely four years.

== Family ==
- Father: Zhang Ao, Prince of Zhao and Marquis of Xuanping
  - Grandfather: Zhang Er, Prince Jin of Zhao
- Mother: Princess Yuan of Lu (Note: This is according to Empress Zhang's biography in Han Shu. In Shiji, the identity of her mother was not recorded.)
  - Grandfather/father-in-law: Emperor Gaozu of Han
    - Great-grandfather: Liu Taigong
  - Grandmother/mother-in-law: Empress Lü Zhi
    - Brother: Zhang Yan, Prince Yuan of Lu and Marquis of Nangong
    - Brother: Zhang Shou, Marquis of Lechang
- Uncle/Husband: Emperor Hui of Han
  - Adopted son: Emperor Qianshao
  - Adopted son: Liu Qiang, Prince Huai of Huaiyang
  - Adopted son: Liu Buyi, Prince Ai of Hengshan
  - Adopted son: Liu Hong, Emperor Houshao
  - Adopted son: Liu Zhao, Prince of Hengshan
  - Adopted son: Liu Wu, Prince of Huaiyang
  - Adopted son: Liu Tai, Prince of Liang

== Titles ==
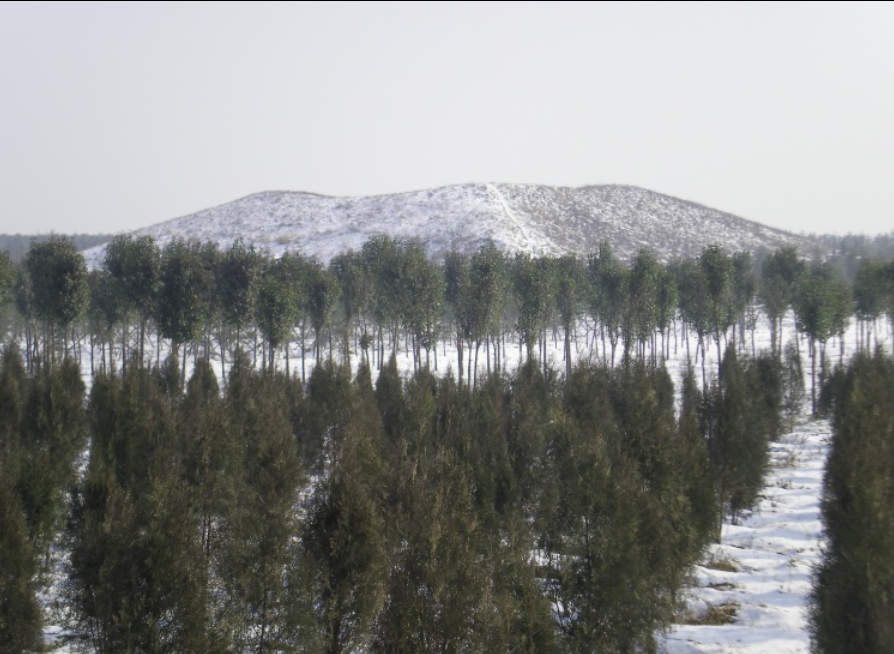
Tomb of Emperess Zhang Yan in Anling (安陵), in Xianyang, Shaanxi

- 210–192 BC: Princess Zhang Yan of Zhao
- 192–188 BC: Empress of China
- 188–163 BC: Empress Xiaohui

== Notes ==
Chinese royalty
Preceded by Empress Lü Zhi	Empress of Western Han Dynasty; 192–188 BC	Succeeded by Empress Lü
