= Rule of Wen and Jing =

180–141 BC period of China's Han Dynasty

The Rule of Wen and Jing (Chinese: 文景之治; pinyin: wén jǐng zhī zhì, 180 BC – 141 BC) refers to the reigns of Emperor Wen of Han and his son Emperor Jing of Han, a period known for the benevolence and thriftiness of the emperors, reduction in tax and other burdens on the people, pacifism, and general stability. The Rule of Wen and Jing was marked by Taoist influences in political theory, due to the influence of Emperor Wen's wife and Emperor Jing's mother, Empress Dou. Taoist influence on government did not truly end until her death in 135 BC, during the reign of her grandson Emperor Wu of Han.

The Rule of Wen and Jing is often viewed as one of the golden ages in Chinese history, in particularly the Western Han dynasty, and it paved the way for the long and stable reign of Emperor Wu. It also enabled Emperor Wu to maintain a powerful army and employ an aggressive foreign policy, which greatly expanded the empire and ultimately pushed the Han dynasty to its zenith. The main criticism against it, however, was an increase of wealth inequality due to the lack of wealth redistribution mechanisms.
