= Emperor Houshao of Han =

Emperor of the Han dynasty from 184 to 180 BC

Emperor Houshao of Han 漢後少帝
- Huangdi (皇帝)

Emperor of the Han dynasty
- Reign: 15 June 184 – 14 November 180 BC
- Predecessor: Emperor Qianshao
- Successor: Emperor Wen
- Regent: Empress Lü
- Born: Liu Hong (劉弘) c. March 196 BC
- Died: 14 November 180 BC (aged 16)
- Consorts: Lady Lü
Names
- Family name: Liu (劉); Given name: Hong (弘)
- House: Liu
- Dynasty: Han (Western Han)
- Father: Emperor Hui

Emperor Houshao of Han (Chinese: 漢後少帝; c. March 196 BC – 14 November 180 BC), personal name Liu Hong (劉弘), was the fourth emperor of the Han dynasty. He was a son of Emperor Hui and an unknown wife of him, likely by a concubine—although there is some controversy on the subject—and adopted by Emperor Hui's wife, Empress Zhang Yan. At the instigation of his grandmother, Empress Lü, Empress Zhang had Emperor Houshao's mother put to death.

Very little about Emperor Houshao's life and personality is known. There are only a few major important events in his life that are documented (which does not even include the year of his birth). In September 188 BC, his father Emperor Hui died, and his brother Liu Gong succeeded to the throne as Emperor Qianshao; his name came about as Empress Dowager Lü personally exercised the power of government alone and held power for herself. In 187 BC, he was made the Marquess of Xiangcheng. In 186 BC, after his brother Liu Buyi (劉不疑), the Prince of Hengshan, died, he was made the Prince of Hengshan, and his name was changed to Liu Yi, likely because it was considered inappropriate to have one's name (or one's male ancestors' names) share characters with one's titles.

Some time during or before 184 BC, Emperor Qianshao discovered that he was not, in fact, now-Empress Dowager Zhang's son and that his mother, like Prince Hong's mother, had been put to death. Emperor Qianshao made the mistake of publicly making the remark that when he grew up, Empress Dowager Zhang would pay for this. Grand Empress Dowager Lü, once she heard of this, had Emperor Qianshao secretly imprisoned within the palace and publicly announced that he was severely ill and unable to receive anyone.

After some time, Grand Empress Dowager Lü told the officials that he continued to be ill and incapable of governing, and that he had also suffered a psychosis. She proposed that he be deposed and replaced. The officials complied with her wishes, and he was deposed and put to death. Prince Hong then succeeded his brother to the throne as Emperor Houshao and in effect as Grand Empress Dowager Lü's indisputable puppet. Because Grand Empress Dowager Lü was actually the ruling absolute figure and she still had all the powers of the empire, one thing that is normally done when a new emperor succeeds to the throne—the resetting of the calendar year—was not done; rather, the calendar continued from the start of Emperor Qianshao's reign.

In the autumn of 180 BC, Grand Empress Dowager Lü died of an illness. Emperor Houshao, however, still did not have actual powers, because most power was still largely controlled by the Lü clan. Indeed, the grand empress dowager's will required him to marry the daughter of her nephew Lü Lu (呂禄) and make her empress. The officials of the imperial government, led by Chen Ping and Zhou Bo, however, formed a conspiracy against the Lü clan, and they were successful in surprising the Lü clan and slaughtering them. Afterwards, the conspirators met and made the assertion that none of the sons of Emperor Hui were actually his. Admitting that they were concerned that these imperial children, when they grew up, would take vengeance on the officials, the conspirators resolved to find a replacement emperor.

After a period of disagreement, they settled on Emperor Houshao's uncle, Prince Liu Heng of Dai. Prince Heng soon arrived in the capital Xi'an and was declared emperor, and Emperor Houshao was deposed. Initially, one of the officials involved in the conspiracy, Emperor Houshao's cousin, Liu Xingju, the Marquess of Dongmou, merely expelled Emperor Houshao from the palace and had him stay at the Ministry of Palace Supplies. Some of the imperial guard still wished to resist the coup d'etat but were eventually persuaded by the officials to desist. Some time later that year, Emperor Houshao was executed along with his three younger brothers. Historians are of the view that his wife, Empress Lü, was also executed, but there is no explicit evidence to support this view.

Emperor Houshao, considered to be a mere puppet of Grand Empress Dowager Lü, is totally omitted from the official list of emperors of the Han dynasty.

== Consorts ==
- Empress, of the Lü clan (皇后 呂氏; d. 180 BC), second cousin

== See also ==
1. Family tree of the Han dynasty

Emperor Houshao of Han House of Liu Died: 180 BC
Regnal titles
Preceded by Emperor Qianshao of Han	Emperor of China; Western Han; 184–180 BC with Empress Dowager Lü (184–180 BC)	Succeeded by Emperor Wen of Han
