= Emperor Qianshao of Han =

Emperor of the Han dynasty from 188 to 184 BC

Emperor Qianshao of Han 漢前少帝
- Huangdi (皇帝)

Emperor of the Han dynasty
- Reign: 26 September 188 – 15 June 184 BC
- Predecessor: Emperor Hui
- Successor: Emperor Houshao
- Regent: Empress Lü
- Born: 193 BC
- Died: 15 June 184 BC (aged about 8–9)
Names
- Family name: Liu (劉); Given name: Gong (恭)?
- House: Liu
- Dynasty: Han (Western Han)
- Father: Emperor Hui

Emperor Qianshao of Han (Chinese: 漢前少帝, 193 BC – 15 June 184 BC), birth name said to be Liu Gong (Chinese: 劉恭), was the third emperor of the Han dynasty. He was a son of Emperor Hui by an unknown minor wife or concubine—although there is some controversy on the subject—and was adopted by Emperor Hui's wife, Empress Zhang Yan. At the instigation of his grandmother, Empress Lü, Empress Zhang had Emperor Qianshao's mother put to death.

Very little about Emperor Qianshao's life and personality is known. There are only a few major important events in his life that are documented (which does not even include the year of his birth). In 188 BC, his father Emperor Hui died, and he, who had been previously made crown prince, succeeded to the throne. However, his grandmother, now Grand Empress Dowager Lü, publicly presided over all government affairs.

Sometime in or before 184 BC, Emperor Qianshao discovered that he was not in fact now-Empress Dowager Zhang's son and that his mother had been put to death. He made the mistake of remarking that when he grew up, those who killed his mother would pay for this. Grand Empress Dowager Lü, once she heard of this, had him secretly imprisoned within the palace and publicly announced that he was severely ill and unable to receive anyone. After some time, she told the officials that he continued to be ill and incapable of governing, and that he had also suffered a psychosis. She proposed that he be deposed and replaced. The officials complied with her wishes, and he was deposed and put to death. He was succeeded by his brother Liu Yi on 15 June 184 BCE; Liu Yi's name was then changed to Liu Hong.

Emperor Qianshao, considered to be a mere puppet of Grand Empress Dowager Lü, is often omitted from the official list of emperors of the Han dynasty.

== See also ==
- Family tree of the Han dynasty

Emperor Qianshao of Han House of Liu Died: 184 BC
Regnal titles
Preceded by Emperor Hui of Han	Emperor of China; Western Han; 188–184 BC with Empress Dowager Lü (188–184 BC)	Succeeded by Emperor Houshao of Han
