= Empress Lü =

Empress of Han China from 202 to 195 BC, regent from 195 to 180 BC

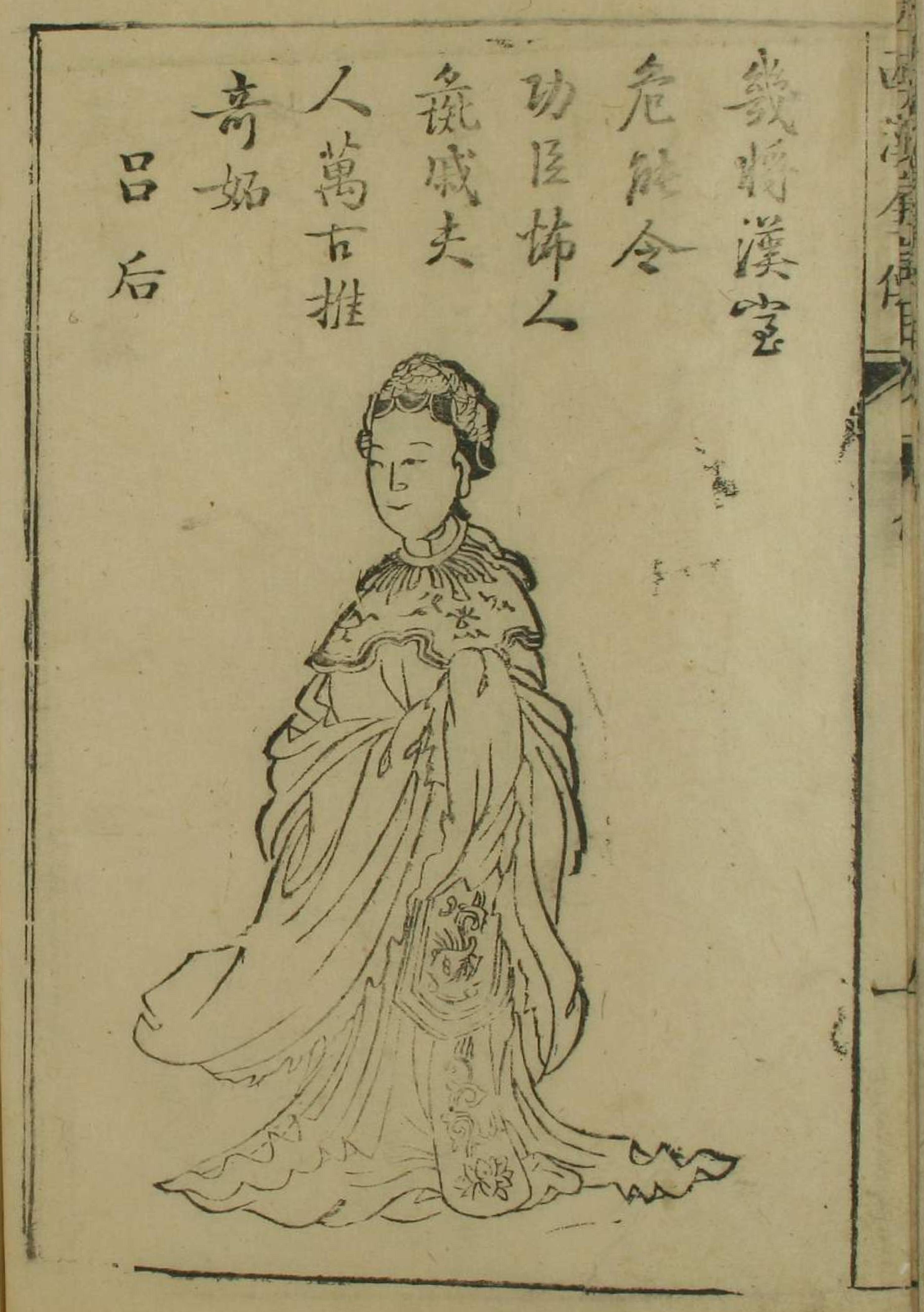

Regent of the Han dynasty
- Regency: 195–180 BC
- Monarchs: Emperor Hui; Emperor Qianshao; Emperor Houshao

Empress Dowager of the Han dynasty
- Tenure: 1 June 195 – 18 August 180 BC (15 years as mother of the emperor, 195–188 BC, and as grandmother of the emperor, 188–180 BC)
- Successor: Empress Dowager Bo

Empress Consort of the Han dynasty
- Tenure: 202– 1 June 195 BC
- Successor: Empress Xiaohui
- Born: 241 BC; Shanfu, China
- Died: 18 August 180 BC (aged 60–61); Han China
- Burial: Changling Mausoleum
- Spouse: Emperor Gaozu of Han
- Issue: Princess Yuan of Lu; Emperor Hui of Han
- Father: Lü Wen, Prince Xuan of Lü

Chinese name
- Traditional Chinese: 呂雉
- Simplified Chinese: 吕雉
Transcriptions
Standard Mandarin
- Hanyu Pinyin: Lǚ Zhì
- Gwoyeu Romatzyh: Leu Jyh
- Wade–Giles: Lü^{3} Chih^{4}
- Yale Romanization: Lyǔ Jr̀
- IPA: [lỳ ʈʂɻ̩̂]

Lü Zhi (241 BC – 18 August 180 BC), courtesy name Exu (娥姁), and commonly known as Empress Lü (traditional Chinese: 呂后; simplified Chinese: 吕后; pinyin: Lǚ Hòu) and formally Empress Gao of Han (漢高后; 汉高后; Hàn Gāo Hòu), was the empress consort of Gaozu, the founding emperor of the Han dynasty. They had two known children, Liu Ying (later Emperor Hui of Han) and Princess Yuan of Lu. Lü was the first woman to assume the title of "empress of China" and paramount power. After Gaozu's death, she was honored as empress dowager and ruled as regent during the short reigns of Emperor Hui and his successors Emperor Qianshao and Emperor Houshao.

She played a role in the rise and foundation of her husband, Emperor Gaozu, and his dynasty, and in some of the laws and customs laid down by him. Empress Lü, even in the absence of her husband from the capital, killed two prominent generals who played an important role in Gaozu's rise to power, namely Han Xin and Peng Yue, as a lesson for the aristocracy and other generals. In June 195 BC, with the death of Gaozu, Empress Lü became, as the widow of the late emperor and mother of the new emperor, Empress Dowager (皇太后; Huángtàihòu), and assumed a leadership role in her son's administration.

Less than a year after Emperor Hui's accession to the throne, in 194 BC, Lü had one of the late Emperor Gaozu's consorts whom she deeply hated, Concubine Qi, put to death in a cruel manner. She also had Concubine Qi's son Liu Ruyi fatally poisoned. Emperor Hui was shocked by his mother's cruelty and fell sick for a year, and thereafter no longer became involved in state affairs, and gave more power to his mother. As a result, Empress Dowager Lü held the court, listened to the government, spoke on behalf of the emperor, and did everything (臨朝聽政制; linchao tingzheng zhi).

With the untimely death of her 22-year-old son, Emperor Hui, Empress Dowager Lü subsequently proclaimed his two young sons emperor (known historically as Emperor Qianshao and Emperor Houshao respectively). She gained more power than ever before, and these two young emperors had no legitimacy as emperors in history; the history of this 8-year period is considered and recognized as the reign of Empress Dowager Lü. She dominated the political scene for 15 years until her death in August 180 BC, and is often depicted as the first woman to have ruled China. While four women are noted as having been politically active before her—Fu Hao, Yi Jiang, Lady Nanzi, and Queen Dowager Xuan—Lü was perhaps the first woman to have ruled over united China.

== Family background and marriage to Liu Bang ==
Lü Zhi was born in Shanfu County (單父; present-day Shan County, Shandong) during the late Qin dynasty. Her courtesy name was Exu (娥姁; Éxǔ). To flee from enemies, her father Lü Wen (呂文) brought their family to Pei County, settled there, and became a close friend of the county magistrate. Many influential men in town came to visit Lü Wen. Xiao He, then an assistant of the magistrate, was in charge of the seating arrangement and collection of gifts from guests at a banquet in Lü Wen's house, and he announced, "Those who do not offer more than 1,000 coins in gifts shall be seated outside the hall." Liu Bang (later Emperor Gaozu of Han), then a minor patrol officer (亭長), went there bringing a single cent and said, "I offer 10,000 coins." Lü Wen saw Liu Bang and was so impressed with him on first sight, that he immediately stood up and welcomed Liu into the hall to sit beside him. Xiao He told Lü Wen that Liu Bang was not serious, but Liu ignored him and chatted with Lü. Lü Wen said, "I used to predict fortunes for many people but I've never seen someone so exceptional like you before." Lü Wen then offered his daughter Lü Zhi's hand in marriage to Liu Bang and they were wed. Lü Zhi bore Liu Bang a daughter (later Princess Yuan of Lu) and a son, Liu Ying (later Emperor Hui of Han).

Liu Bang later participated in the rebellion against the Qin dynasty under the insurgent Chu kingdom, nominally-ruled by King Huai II. Lü Zhi and her two children remained with her father and family for most of the time during this period.

== Life during the Chu–Han Contention ==
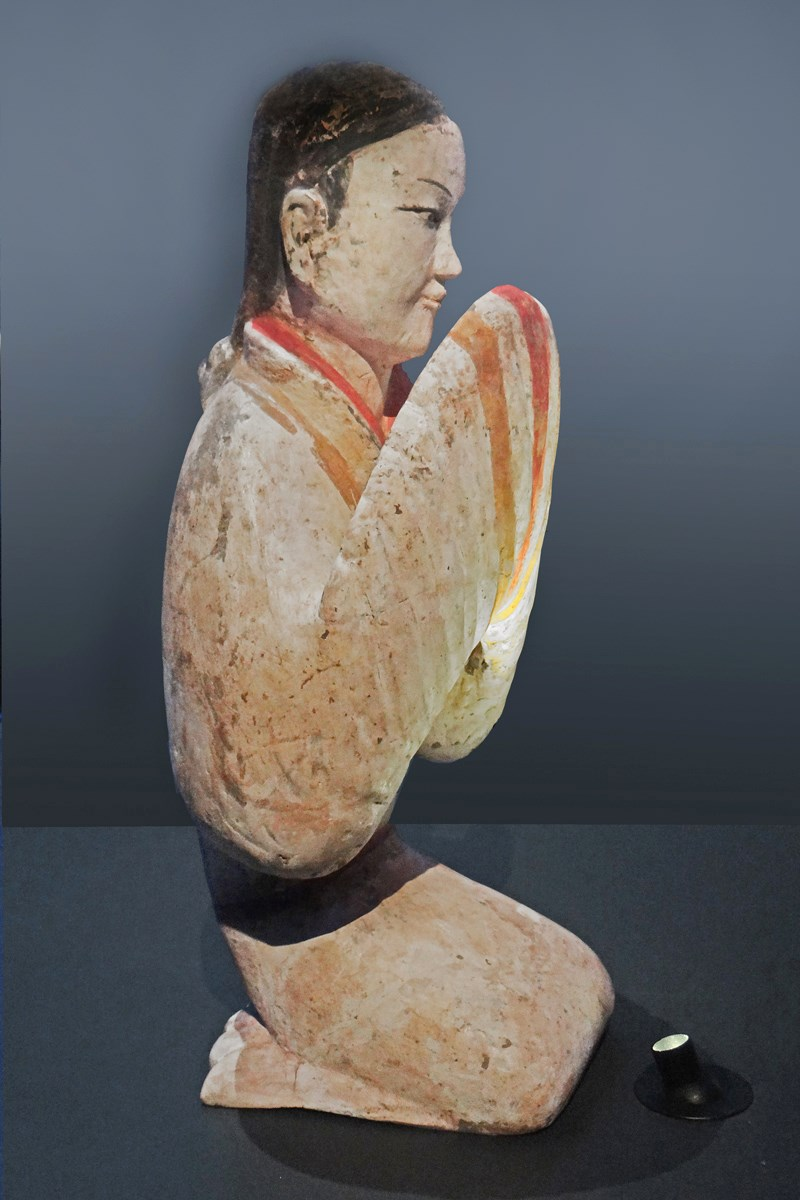
A Western Han (202 BC – 8 AD) ceramic statuette of a seated woman and court attendant holding up her robes, from a tomb in Xianyang, Shaanxi province

In early 206 BC, after the fall of the Qin dynasty, Xiang Yu divided the former Qin Empire into the Eighteen Kingdoms. Liu Bang was named "King of Han" and given the lands in the remote Bashu region (in present-day Sichuan) as his domain. However, Liu Bang's family, including Lü Zhi and her children, remained in Pei County, which was a territory of Xiang Yu's kingdom of Western Chu.

Later that year, Liu Bang attacked and seized the Three Qins (three kingdoms covering the Guanzhong region) directly north of his own fief. Guanzhong was rightfully Liu Bang's, according to an earlier promise by Emperor Yi of Chu (previously known as King Huai II of Chu) to appoint whoever conquered Guanzhong first (during the rebellion against the Qin dynasty) as king of that area. This marked the beginning of a four-year power struggle for supremacy over China between Liu Bang and Xiang Yu, from 206 BC to 202 BC, known as the Chu–Han Contention. Xiang Yu initially took no action against Liu Bang's family. In the eighth lunar month, Liu Bang sent his followers, Wang Xi (王吸) and Xue Ou (薛歐), to meet Wang Ling (王陵) in Nanyang and fetch his family. However Xiang Yu mobilised troops to Yangxia (陽夏) and prevented the Han forces from advancing.

In the summer of 205 BC, Liu Bang took advantage of the situation when Xiang Yu was occupied with suppressing rebellions in the Qi kingdom to attack and capture Western Chu's capital of Pengcheng. Xiang Yu immediately withdrew from Qi and launched a counterattack, defeating Liu Bang's forces at Suishui (睢水). Lü Zhi and Liu Bang's family were captured by Chu forces and held hostage. During this period of time, Lü Zhi started an illicit affair with Shen Yiji (審食其), one of Liu Bang's followers, who was also held captive together with her.

In the autumn of 203 BC, Liu Bang and Xiang Yu came to a temporary reconciliation, known as the Treaty of Hong Canal, which divided China into west and east under their Han and Western Chu domains respectively. As part of their agreement, Xiang Yu released Lü Zhi and Liu Bang's family and returned them to Liu. Lü Zhi was given the title of "Queen Consort of Han" (漢王妃). Liu Bang later renounced the truce and attacked Xiang Yu, eventually defeating the latter at the Battle of Gaixia in 202 BC and unifying China under his rule. Liu Bang proclaimed himself Emperor of China and established the Han dynasty. He instated Lü Zhi as his empress and their son Liu Ying as crown prince.

== As empress and paramount authority ==
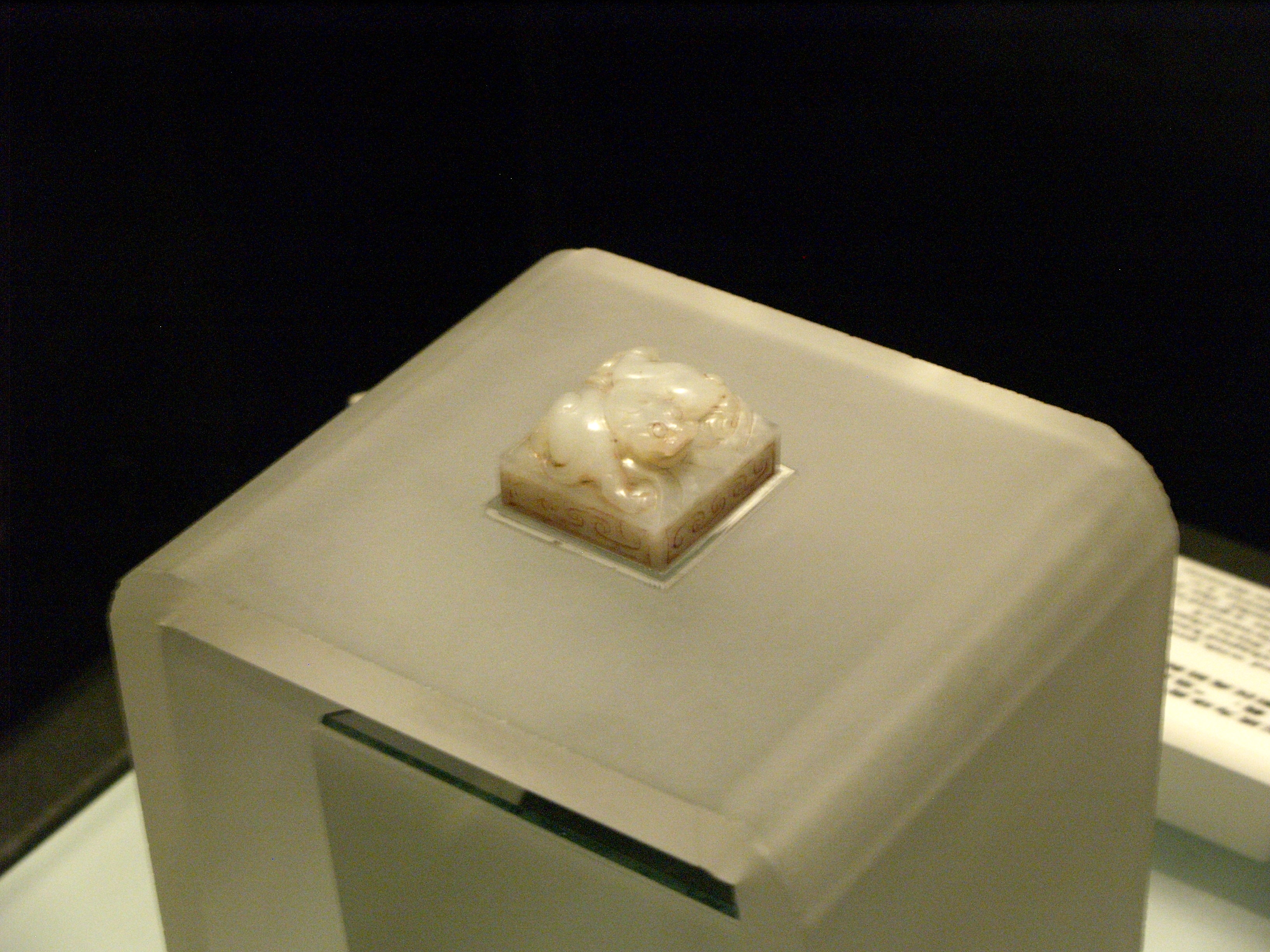
Lü Zhi's jade seal, excavated from Xianyang, now in the Shaanxi History Museum.

Even after Emperor Gaozu (Liu Bang)'s victory over Xiang Yu, there were still unstable areas in the empire, requiring the new government to launch military campaigns to pacify these regions thereafter. Gaozu placed Empress Lü Zhi and the crown prince Liu Ying (Lü Zhi's son) in charge of the capital Chang'an and making key decisions in court, assisted by the chancellor Xiao He and other ministers. During this time, Lü Zhi proved herself to be a competent administrator in domestic affairs, and she quickly established strong working relationships with many of Gaozu's officials, who admired her for her capability and feared her for her ruthlessness. After the war ended and Emperor Gaozu returned, she remained in power and she was always influential in many of the country's affairs.

=== Roles in the deaths of Han Xin and Peng Yue ===
Lü Zhi is known for her roles in the deaths of Han Xin and Peng Yue, two of Emperor Gaozu's subjects who contributed greatly to the founding of the Han dynasty, of whose military capabilities both she and her husband had been apprehensive.

In 196 BC, Gaozu left the capital Chang'an to suppress a revolt in Julu started by Chen Xi, the Marquis of Yangxia. A year before, Chen Xi met Han Xin before departing from Chang'an for Julu, and it was alleged that Han Xin was involved in the rebellion. Lü Zhi became wary of Han Xin, and after consulting the chancellor Xiao He, she had Xiao summon Han to meet her in Changle Palace. There, the empress had Han Xin taken by surprise, captured, and subsequently executed in a torturous manner. Lü Zhi also ordered Han Xin's family and relatives to be put to death as well.

When Gaozu was putting down Chen Xi's revolt, he requested reinforcements from Peng Yue but the latter claimed that he was ill and sent his subordinates to assist Gaozu instead. After Chen Xi's rebellion was quelled, Gaozu heard rumours that Peng Yue was plotting against him too, and he had Peng arrested and stripped off his titles. Peng was demoted to the status of a commoner and exiled to the remote Qingyi County (青衣縣; in present-day Ya'an, Sichuan). During his journey to Qingyi, Peng Yue encountered Lü Zhi, who wanted to have him killed. He pleaded with her to spare his life and let him return to his hometown in Changyi (昌邑; present-day Jinxiang County, Shandong), and the empress pretended to agree. Peng Yue was brought to Luoyang, where he was subsequently executed on false charges of treason. Lü Zhi ordered Peng Yue's body to be mutilated and had Peng's clan exterminated as well.

=== Dispute over the succession ===
In his late years, Emperor Gaozu started favouring one of his younger consorts, Concubine Qi, who bore him a son, Liu Ruyi, who was instated as Prince of Zhao in 198 BC, displacing Lü Zhi's son-in-law Zhang Ao (Princess Yuan of Lu's husband). Gaozu had the intention of replacing Liu Ying with Liu Ruyi as crown prince, reasoning that the former was too "soft-hearted and weak" and that the latter resembled him more. Since Lü Zhi had strong rapport with many ministers, they generally opposed Gaozu's decision but the emperor seemed bent on deposing Liu Ying. Lü Zhi became worried and she approached Zhang Liang for help, and the latter analysed that Gaozu was changing the succession on grounds of favouritism. Zhang Liang invited the "Four Whiteheads of Mount Shang", a group of four reclusive wise men, to persuade Gaozu to change his decision. The four men promised to assist Liu Ying in future if he became emperor, and Gaozu was pleased to see that Liu Ying had their support. Gaozu told Concubine Qi, "I wanted to replace (the crown prince). Now I see that he has the support of those four men; he is fully fledged and difficult to unseat. Empress Lü is really in charge!" This marked the end of the dispute over the succession and affirmed Liu Ying's role as crown prince. (Note: In his Zizhi Tongjian Kaoyi, Sima Guang was skeptical of this account. He opinioned that given Liu Bang's tenacious personality, he would not easily change his mind due to criticism from others; the main reason why Liu Bang did not make Liu Ruyi taizi was that Liu Bang feared that after his death, Ruyi would not be able to receive support from court officials. If Liu Bang really wanted to make Ruyi taizi, as someone who had been close to Liu Bang for many years, Zhang Liang was right in his observation that it would take more than a few words to change Liu Bang's mind; so, how can a few words from four old men of the woods convince Liu Bang? If the "Four Whiteheads" could affect the succession, Liu Bang would have killed them, and not lament to Lady Qi. Also, even if the "Four Whiteheads" did convince Liu Bang to alter the succession, it would be an example of Zhang Liang providing assistance to Liu Ruyi against the latter's father, which is something Zhang would not have done. Thus, Sima did not include the account of the "Four Whiteheads" in Zizhi Tongjian, just like he did not include the account of Qin not attacking the Hangu Pass for 15 years after Su Qin had canvassed the other Six States, and the account of the Qin army retreating for 50 li after Lu Zhonglian persuaded Xinyuan Yan. Sima Guang also criticized Sima Qian for including these three accounts in his Shiji due to the latter's propensity in believing incredible accounts.)

== As empress dowager and de facto Regent ==
In June 195 BC, Emperor Gaozu died and was succeeded by Liu Ying, who became historically known as Emperor Hui of Han. Lü Zhi was honoured by Emperor Hui as empress dowager. She exerted more influence during the reign of her son than she had when she was empress, and she became the powerful and effective lead figure in his administration.

=== Roles in the deaths of Concubine Qi and Liu Ruyi ===
Lü Zhi did not harm most of Gaozu's other consorts and treated them according to the rules and customs of the imperial family. For example, consorts who bore male children that were instated as princes were granted the title of "Princess Dowager" (王太妃) in their respective sons' principalities. One exception was Concubine Qi, whom Lü Zhi greatly resented because of the dispute over the succession between Liu Ruyi (Qi's son) and Liu Ying. Liu Ruyi, the Prince of Zhao, was away in his principality, so Lü Zhi targeted Concubine Qi. She had Qi stripped of her position, treated like a convict (head shaved, in stocks, dressed in prison garb), and forced to do hard labour in the form of milling rice.

Lü Zhi then summoned Liu Ruyi, who was around the age of 12 then, to Chang'an, intending to kill him together with his mother. However Zhou Chang (周昌), the chancellor in Liu Ruyi's principality, whom Lü Zhi respected because of his stern opposition to Emperor Gaozu's proposal to make Liu Ruyi crown prince, temporarily protected Liu Ruyi from harm by responding to Lü Zhi's order that, "The Prince of Zhao is ill and unfit for travelling over long distances." Lü Zhi then ordered Zhou Chang to come to the capital, had him detained, and then summoned Liu Ruyi again. Emperor Hui tried to save Liu Ruyi by intercepting his half-brother before the latter entered Chang'an, and kept Liu Ruyi by his side most of the time. Lü Zhi refrained from carrying out her plans for several months because she feared that she might harm Emperor Hui as well.

One morning in the winter of 195–194 BC, Emperor Hui went for a hunting trip and did not bring Liu Ruyi with him because the latter refused to get out of bed. Lü Zhi's chance arrived, so she sent an assassin to force poisoned wine down Liu Ruyi's throat. The young prince was dead by the time Emperor Hui returned. Lü Zhi then had Concubine Qi killed in an inhumane manner: she had Qi's hands and feet chopped off, eyes gouged out, ears burned, nose sliced off, tongue cut out, forced her to drink a potion that made her mute, and had her thrown into a latrine. She called Qi a "human swine" (人彘). Several days later, Emperor Hui was taken to view the "human swine" and was shocked to learn that it was Concubine Qi. He cried loudly and became ill for a long time. He requested to see his mother and said, "This is something done not by a human. As the empress dowager's son, I'll never be able to rule the empire." From then on, Emperor Hui indulged himself in carnal pleasures and ignored state affairs, leaving all of them to his mother, and this caused power to fall completely into her hands.

=== Treatment of Emperor Gaozu's other sons ===
Around the winter of 195–194 BC, Liu Fei, the Prince of Qi, Emperor Gaozu's eldest son born to Lady Cao (曹氏), visited Chang'an and he and Emperor Hui attended a banquet hosted by the empress dowager. Emperor Hui honoured Liu Fei as an older half-brother and treated the latter respectfully. Lü Zhi felt offended and secretly instructed her servants to pour a cup of poisoned wine for Liu Fei, and then toasted him. Just as Liu Fei was about to drink the wine, Emperor Hui realised his mother's intention and grabbed Liu Fei's cup as if he would drink from it. Lü Zhi immediately jumped up and knocked the cup out of Emperor Hui's hand. Liu Fei then offered to give up an entire commandery from his principality to Lü Zhi's daughter, Princess Yuan of Lu. Lü Zhi accepted the offer and allowed him to leave.

Lü Zhi also played a role in the death of another of Gaozu's sons, Liu You, the Prince of Zhao. Liu You married Lü Zhi's niece but was caught having an affair with another woman, so Lü Zhi's niece reported to her aunt that Liu You was plotting a rebellion. Lü Zhi summoned Liu You to Chang'an and had him imprisoned and deprived of food. Liu You was afraid of committing suicide and eventually starved to death, in February 181 BC.

Lü Zhi then transferred another of Gaozu's sons, Liu Hui, the Prince of Liang, to Zhao, and forced him to marry a daughter of Lü Chan. The Lü clan grabbed the authority of Zhao and oversaw Liu Hui, thus making Liu Hui feel restricted. Princess Lü had a favored concubine of Liu Hui poisoned to death. Liu Hui was distressed and committed suicide in fear in July 181 BC.

For the matters above, Lü Zhi was criticized for "having murdered three princes of Zhao".

=== Marriage proposal from Modu ===
In 192 BC, Lü Zhi received a marriage proposal from the Xiongnu chanyu Modu, who wrote as follows in a letter meant to intimidate and mock her:

I'm a lonesome ruler born in marshes and raised in plains populated by livestock. I've visited your border numerous times and wanted to tour China. Your Majesty is now alone and living in solitude. Since both of us are not happy and have nothing to entertain ourselves, I'm willing to use what I possess to exchange for what you lack.

Lü Zhi was infuriated at the rude proposition, and in a heated court session, her generals advised her to rally an army and exterminate the Xiongnu immediately. As she was about to declare war, an outspoken attendant named Ji Bu pointed out that the Xiongnu army was much more powerful than the Chinese. At Ji Bu's words, the court immediately fell into a fearful silence. Rethinking her plans, Lü Zhi rejected Modu's proposition humbly, as follows:

Your Lordship does not forget our land and writes a letter to us, we fear. I retreat to preserve myself. I'm old and frail, I'm losing hair and teeth, and I struggle to maintain balance when I move. Your Lordship has heard wrongly, you shouldn't defile yourself. Our people did not offend you, and should be pardoned. We've two imperial carriages and eight fine steeds, which we graciously offer to Your Lordship.

However, she continued implementing the heqin policy of marrying Han princesses to Xiongnu chieftains and paying tribute to the Xiongnu in exchange for peace between both sides.

=== Emperor Hui's marriage to Empress Zhang Yan ===
In 191 BC, at Lü Zhi's insistence, Emperor Hui married his niece Zhang Yan (Princess Yuan of Lu's daughter) and made her empress. They did not have any children. It was alleged that Lü Zhi told Zhang Yan to adopt eight boys and have their mothers killed. There is uncertainty whether these children were Emperor Hui's; the traditional view is that they were not, while modern historians believe that they were born to his concubines.

== As Regent de jure and acting emperor ==
Emperor Hui died in 188 BC and was succeeded by Emperor Qianshao, one of the children Empress Zhang adopted. Empress Dowager Lü closely monitored and controlled the imperial court and kept the whole army firmly in her hands, thus maintaining power more strongly than before. His death and the succession of an immature child left power completely and solely in the hands of Empress Dowager Lü, and as a regent, legitimized her as the first female absolute ruler in Chinese history to do so exclusively. Lü Zhi's position as regent was first recorded in the official history of Ban Gu in the Book of Han:

"Emperor Hui died and the prince was established as emperor, the Empress Dowager presiding over court and issuing edicts, and gave a general imperial pardon."

As grandmother of the infant emperor, Lü Zhi retained her title as Empress Dowager and never claimed the title as Grand Empress Dowager. As a result, she played the role of an emperor and de facto filled the empty throne. She addressed herself as Zhèn (朕), a first-person pronoun reserved for use by the emperor after the Qin dynasty. Officials addressed her as "Imperial Majesty" (陛下; Bìxià)), an honorific used when addressing the emperor directly, not "Imperial Highness" (殿下; Diànxià)), an honorific used when addressing the empress or empress dowager directly. The edicts (敕; chi) she issued were referred to as Sheng Zhe (聖制), which were the personal orders of the emperor. Conventional historians do not consider Emperor Qianshao a true sovereign, so he is usually omitted from the list of emperors of the Han dynasty.

Emperor Gaozu had previously decreed that no non-imperial clan members could become princes (not including the vassal kings), a rule that Lü Zhi herself had a hand in creating. In spite of this, Lü Zhi attempted to install some of her kinsmen as princes. The Right Chancellor Wang Ling (王陵) opposed her decision but the Left Chancellor Chen Ping and general Zhou Bo accepted this move. When Wang Ling rebuked Chen Ping and Zhou Bo in private for going against Emperor Gaozu's law, they rationalized that their compliance with the empress dowager's wishes was necessary to protect the empire and the Liu clan. Lü Zhi promoted Wang Ling to the position of Grand Tutor (太傅) but the latter claimed that he was ill and declined, so she ordered him to return to his marquisate (Wang Ling held the title of Marquis of Anguo). Lü Zhi then appointed Chen Ping as Right Chancellor and her illicit lover Shen Yiji (審食其) as Left Chancellor.

Lü Zhi then proceeded to make her kin nobles. Her first step was to install her maternal grandson Zhang Yan (張偃; Princess Yuan of Lu's son, Empress Zhang Yan's brother) as the Prince of Lu. Over the next few years she instated several of her nephews and grandnephews as princes and marquises. In an unprecedented move, in 184 BC, Lü Zhi also granted her younger sister Lü Xu (呂須) the title of Marquise of Lingguang, in a separate fief from that of the latter's husband Fan Kuai.

Around 184 BC, Emperor Qianshao discovered that he was not Empress Dowager Zhang Yan's son, and his birth mother was executed by the empress dowager. He remarked that when he grew up he would make Empress Dowager Zhang pay for his mother's death. When Lü Zhi heard about this, she had the young emperor secretly confined in the palace and publicly announced that the emperor was seriously ill and unable to meet anyone. After some time, she told the imperial court that Emperor Qianshao was still sick and suffered from psychosis, and was thus incapable of ruling. She then proposed that the emperor be replaced. The court complied with her wish, and Emperor Qianshao was deposed and put to death. He was succeeded by his brother, Liu Yi (劉義), who was renamed to Liu Hong (劉弘), and was also historically known as Emperor Houshao of Han. Like his predecessor Emperor Qianshao, Liu Hong is generally not regarded as a real monarch, so he is also not included in the list of emperors of the Han dynasty.

== Death ==
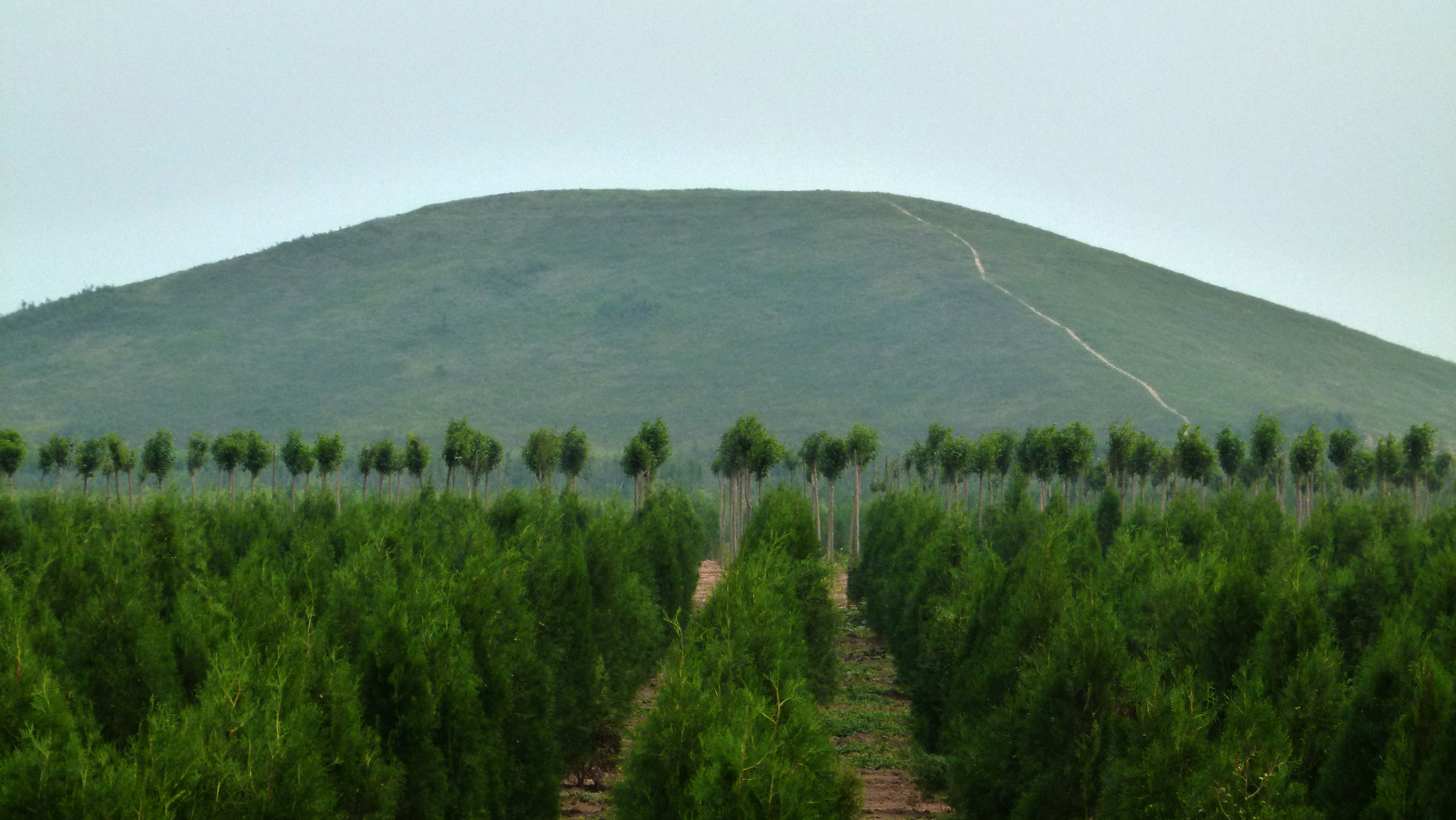
Tomb of Empress Lü in Changling, Xianyang, Shaanxi

Lü Zhi died of illness at the age of 61 in 180 BC and was interred in Emperor Gaozu's tomb in Changling (長陵). Near the end of Wang Mang's Xin dynasty (AD 9 – AD 23), Lü Zhi's body was desecrated by Chimei rebels when they raided Gaozu's tomb. Emperor Guangwu, who restored the Han dynasty in AD 25, posthumously replaced Lü Zhi as "Empress Gao" in Gaozu's temple with another of Gaozu's concubines, Consort Bo. Lü Zhi was enshrined in a separate temple instead.

In the aftermath of Lü Zhi's death, her clan members were overthrown from their positions of power and massacred, in an event historically known as the Lü Clan Disturbance. The masterminds of this coup d'état included ministers who previously served Emperor Gaozu, including Chen Ping, Zhou Bo, and Guan Ying. Liu Heng, a son of Gaozu and Consort Bo, was installed on the throne as Emperor Wen of Han.

== Family ==
- Father: Lü Wen (呂文), sometimes referred to as Lü Gong (呂公). In 187 BC, he was granted the posthumous title of "Prince Xuan of Lü" (呂宣王).
- Husband: Liu Bang, Emperor Gaozu of Han.
- Children:
  - Liu Ying, Emperor Hui of Han.
  - Princess Yuan of Lu (魯元公主), personal name unknown.
- Siblings and their descendants:
  - Lü Changxu (呂長姁), older sister.
    - Lü Ping (呂平), Lü Changxu's son, Marquis of Fuliu (扶柳侯).
  - Lü Ze (呂澤), older brother, posthumously known as "Prince Daowu of Lü" (呂悼武王).
    - Lü Tai (呂台), Lü Ze's son, instated as Prince Su of Lü (呂肅王) in 186 BC.
      - Lü Jia (呂嘉), Lü Tai's son, Prince of Lü (呂王).
      - Lü Tong (呂通), Lü Tai's son, instated as Prince of Yan (燕王) in 181 BC.
      - Lü Pi (呂庀), Lü Tai's son, Marquis of Dongping (東平侯).
    - Lü Chan (呂產), Lü Ze's son, instated as Prince of Liang (梁王) in 181 BC.
  - Lü Shizhi (呂釋之), older brother, posthumously known as "Prince Zhao of Zhao" (趙昭王).
    - Lü Ze (呂則), Lü Shizhi's son, Marquis of Jiancheng (建成侯).
    - Lü Zhong (呂種), Lü Shizhi's son, Marquis of Buqi (不其侯).
    - Lü Lu (呂祿), Lü Shizhi's son, instated as Prince of Zhao in 181 BC.
  - Lü Xu (呂嬃), younger sister, Fan Kuai's wife, instated as Marquise of Linguang (臨光侯) in 184 BC

== In popular culture ==
- Portrayed as by Joe Chen in The Beauty of the Emperor series
- Portrayed by Qin Lan in the 2012 television series King's War
- The character of Jia Matiza in Ken Liu's The Dandelion Dynasty is based on Empress Lü.

== See also ==
- Lü Clan Disturbance
- Emperor Hui of Han

Chinese royalty
New dynasty	Empress of the Western Han dynasty 202–195 BC	Succeeded by Empress Zhang Yan
New creation	Empress of China; 202–195 BC	Succeeded by Empress Zhang Yan
