= Emperor Wen of Han =

Emperor of the Han dynasty from 180 to 157 BC

Emperor Wen of Han 漢文帝
- Huangdi (皇帝)
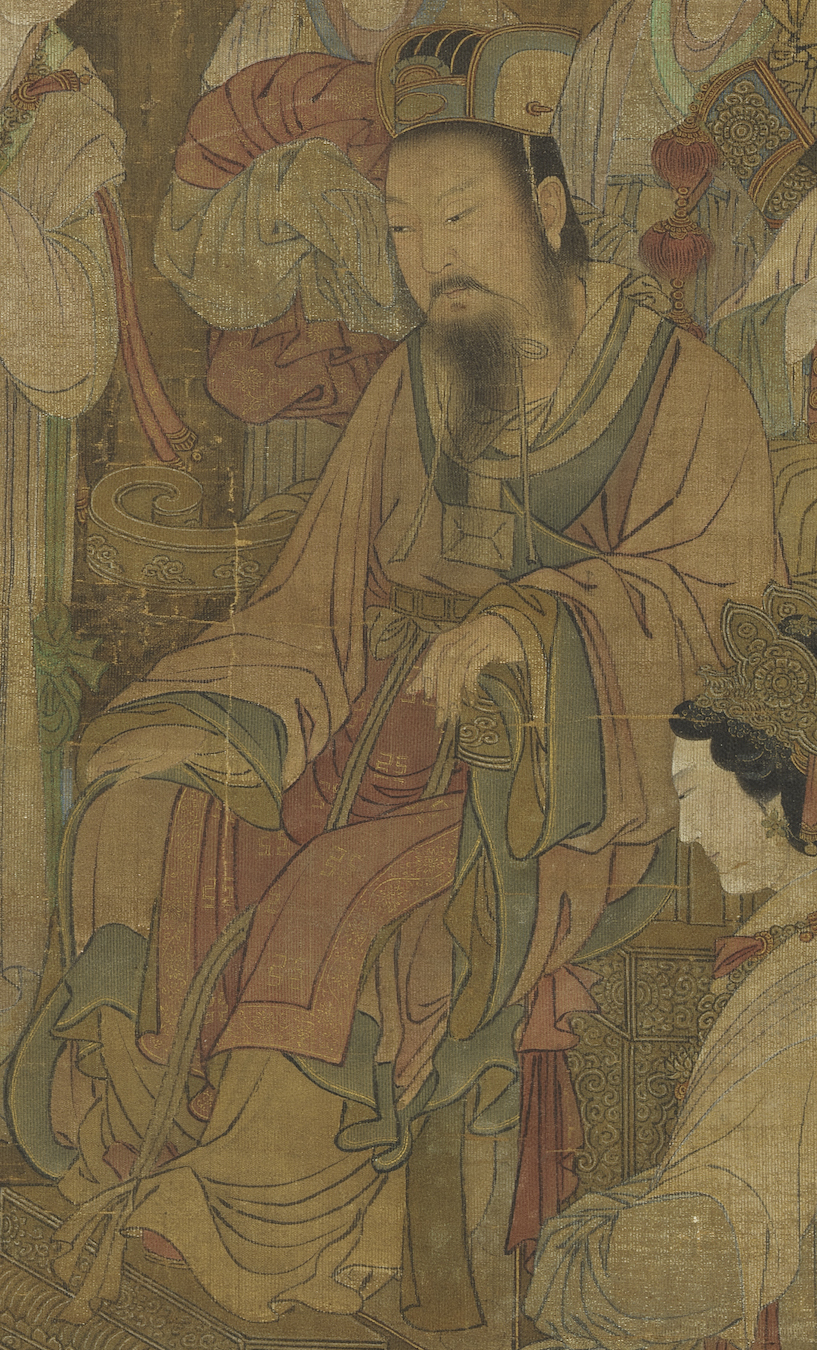
- Posthumous Song dynasty depiction of Emperor Wen, detail from the hanging scroll, Refusing the Seat

Emperor of the Han dynasty
- Reign: 14 November 180 – 6 July 157 BC
- Predecessor: Emperor Houshao
- Successor: Emperor Jing
- Born: Liu Heng (劉恆); 203/02 BC; Chang'an, Han dynasty
- Died: 6 July 157 BC (aged 46); Chang'an, Han dynasty
- Burial: Ba Mausoleum (霸陵)
- Consorts: Lady Lü; Empress Xiaowen; Consort Shen
- Issue: Emperor Jing of Han; Liu Wu, Prince Xiao of Liang; Liu Can, Prince Xiao of Dai; Liu Yi, Prince Huai of Liang; four unnamed sons; Eldest Princess Guantao; Princess Changping
Era dates
- Qíanyuán (前元) 179–164 BC; Hòuyuán (後元) 163–156 BC
Posthumous name
- Short: Emperor Wen (文帝) 'Illustrious Emperor'; Full: Emperor Xiaowen (孝文皇帝)
Temple name
- Taizong (太宗)
- House: Liu
- Dynasty: Han (Western Han)
- Father: Emperor Gaozu
- Mother: Empress Gao

Emperor Wen of Han (Chinese: 漢文帝; 203/02 – 6 July 157 BC), personal name Liu Heng (劉恆), was the fifth emperor of the Han dynasty from 180 until his death in 157 BC. The son of Emperor Gao and Consort Bo, his reign provided a much needed stability within the ruling Liu clan after the unstable and violent regency of Empress Lü, who went after numerous members of the clan. The prosperous reigns of Emperor Wen and his son Emperor Jing are highly regarded by historians, being referred to as the Rule of Wen and Jing. He was one only four Western Han emperors to receive a temple name, along with Emperor Gaozu, Emperor Wu, and Emperor Xuan of Han.

When Emperor Gaozu suppressed the rebellion of Dai (代), he made Liu Heng Prince of Dai. Since Emperor Gaozu's death, power had been in the hands of his wife, Empress Lü, the empress dowager. After Empress Lü's death, the officials eliminated the powerful Lü clan, and deliberately chose the Prince of Dai as the emperor, since his mother, Consort Bo, had no powerful relatives, and her family was known for its humility and thoughtfulness.

Emperor Wen's reign brought a much needed political stability that laid the groundwork for prosperity under his grandson Emperor Wu. According to historians, Emperor Wen trusted and consulted with ministers on state affairs. Under the influence of his Taoist wife, Empress Dou, the emperor also sought to avoid wasteful expenditures. Historians note that the tax rates were at a ratio of "1 out of 30" and "1 out of 60", corresponding to 3.33% and 1.67%, respectively. (These rates are not for income taxes, but property taxes, as the only ancient Chinese attempt to levy an income tax would come in the time of Wang Mang.) Warehouses were so full of grain that some of it was left to decay.

== Life ==
=== Prince of Dai ===
In 196 BCE, after Emperor Gao defeated the Chen Xi rebellion in the Dai region, he made Liu Heng, his son by Consort Bo, the Prince of Dai. The capital of the principality was at Jinyang (晉陽, modern Taiyuan, Shanxi). Dai was a region on the boundaries with Xiongnu, and Emperor Gao probably created the principality with the mind to use it as a base to defend against Xiongnu raids. For the first year of the principality's existence, Chen, whose army was defeated but who eluded capture, remained a threat, until Zhou Bo killed him in battle in November or December 196 BCE. It is not known whether at this time Prince Heng, who was then seven years old, was already in Dai, but it seems likely, because his brother Liu Ruyi was the only prince at the time explicitly to have been recorded to be remaining at the capital Chang'an rather than being sent to his principality.

In February 181 BCE, Prince Heng's half-brother, Prince Liu You of Zhao starved to death in prison. In c. March 181 BCE, Liu Hui, who was formerly Prince of Liang, was made Prince of Zhao; Liu Hui later committed suicide over his marital problems in July that year. After Liu Hui's death, Grand Empress Dowager Lü, who was then in effective control of the imperial government, offered the more prosperous Principality of Zhao to Prince Heng, but Prince Heng, judging correctly that she was intending to make her nephew Lü Lu prince, politely declined and indicated that he preferred remaining on the border. The grand empress dowager then made Lü Lu Prince of Zhao.

During these years, the Principality of Dai did in fact become a key position in the defense against Xiongnu, and Prince Heng became well-acquainted with Xiongnu customs and military strategies, although the extent of his own participation in military actions was unknown.

=== Accession ===
In August 180 BCE, after Grand Empress Dowager Lü died and the officials made a coup d'etat against her clan and slaughtered them (during the Lü Clan Disturbance), after some deliberation, the officials offered the imperial throne to Prince Heng, rather than Prince Liu Xiang of Qi, the oldest grandson of Emperor Gao. The key to their decision was that Prince Xiang's maternal clan was domineering and might repeat the behaviors of the Lü clan, while the clan of Prince Heng's maternal clan, the Bos, were considered to be kind and humble. After some hesitation, Prince Heng, then 23 years old, accepted the throne as Emperor Wen on 14 November 180 BCE. His nephew, Emperor Houshao, viewed as a mere puppet of Grand Empress Dowager Lü and suspected of not being actually a son of Emperor Wen's older brother Emperor Hui, was deposed and executed.

=== Early reign ===
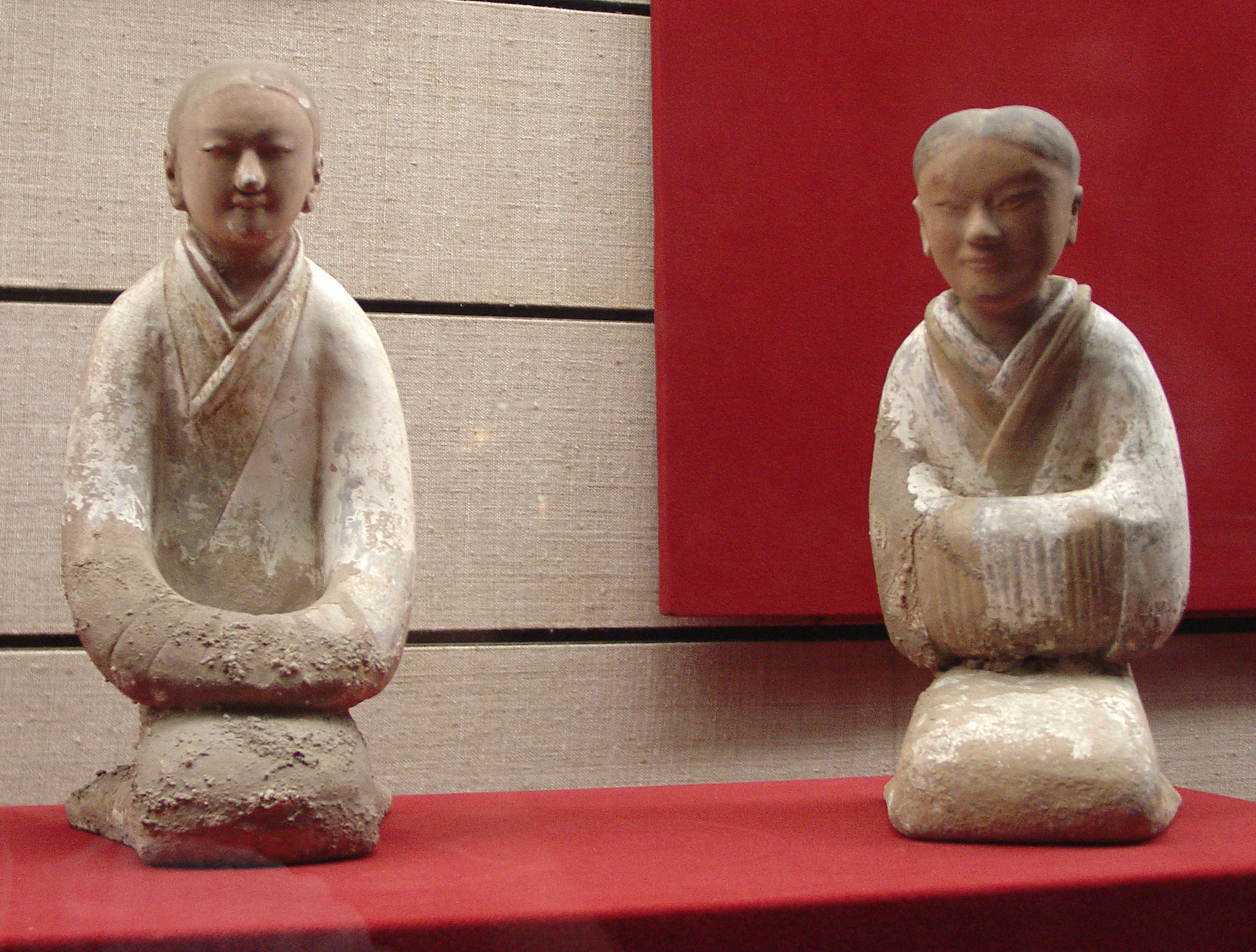
Ceramic female attendants from the tomb of Empress Dou (d. 135 BCE), Western Han dynasty, Shaanxi History Museum, Xi'an

Emperor Wen quickly showed an aptitude to govern the empire with diligence, and appeared to be genuinely concerned for the people's welfare. Heavily influenced by his wife Empress Dou, who was an adherent of Taoism, Emperor Wen governed the country with the general policies of non-interference with the people and relaxed laws. His personal life was marked by thriftiness and general willingness to forgive. He was initially very deferential to Zhou Bo, Chen Ping, and Guan Ying (灌嬰), who were instrumental in his accession, and they served as successive prime ministers.

Examples of Emperor Wen's policies that showed kindness and concern for the people include the following:

- In 179 BCE, he abolished the law that permitted the arrest and imprisonment of parents, wives, and siblings of criminals, with the exception of the crime of treason.
- In 179 BCE, he created a governmental assistance program for those in need. Loans or tax exemptions were offered to widowers, widows, orphans, and seniors without children. He also ordered that monthly stipends of grain, wine, and meat be given to seniors over 80 years of age, and that additional stipends of cloth and cotton be given to seniors over 90 years of age.
- In 179 BCE, he made peace with Nanyue, whose king Zhao Tuo Empress Dowager Lü had offended with an economic embargo and which therefore engaged in raids against the Principality of Changsha (modern Hunan) and the Commandery of Nan (modern Hubei). Emperor Wen accomplished this by writing humble yet assertive letters to Zhao offering peace with dignity and by caring for Zhao's relatives remaining in his native town of Zhending.
- In 178 BCE, after a solar eclipse (then viewed as a symbol of divine displeasure), he requested that officials give him honest criticism and recommend capable individuals for governmental positions. He also tried to decrease mandatory taxes and hard labor.

In 179 BCE, after some hesitation (during which he, apparently influenced by the theory of shanrang (禪讓), thought that maybe it would be more proper for him to find the wisest person in the empire and offer the throne to him, or that he should consider offering the throne to his uncle Liu Jiao (劉交), the Prince of Chu; his cousin Liu Pi (劉濞), the Prince of Wu; or his younger brother Liu Chang (劉長), the Prince of Huainan), he made his oldest son Liu Qi the Crown Prince and Prince Qi's mother, Consort Dou, Empress.

In addition to Empress Dou, Emperor Wen also favored Consort Shen (慎夫人). Despite her favored state, however, she only wore simple dresses rather than elaborate designs, as a means of savings.

Emperor Wen, during the early part of his reign, was often impressed with suggestions tendered by a young official, Jia Yi, but opposed by senior officials, he did not promote Jia to particularly high positions; rather, Jia was put into a rotation as a teacher for various princes. Jia proposed dividing the larger principalities ruled by branch lines of the imperial family, a proposal that Emperor Wen agreed with but hesitated to actually carry out, and he did not actually implement Jia's proposal, which later might have prevented the Rebellion of the Seven States.

=== Middle reign ===
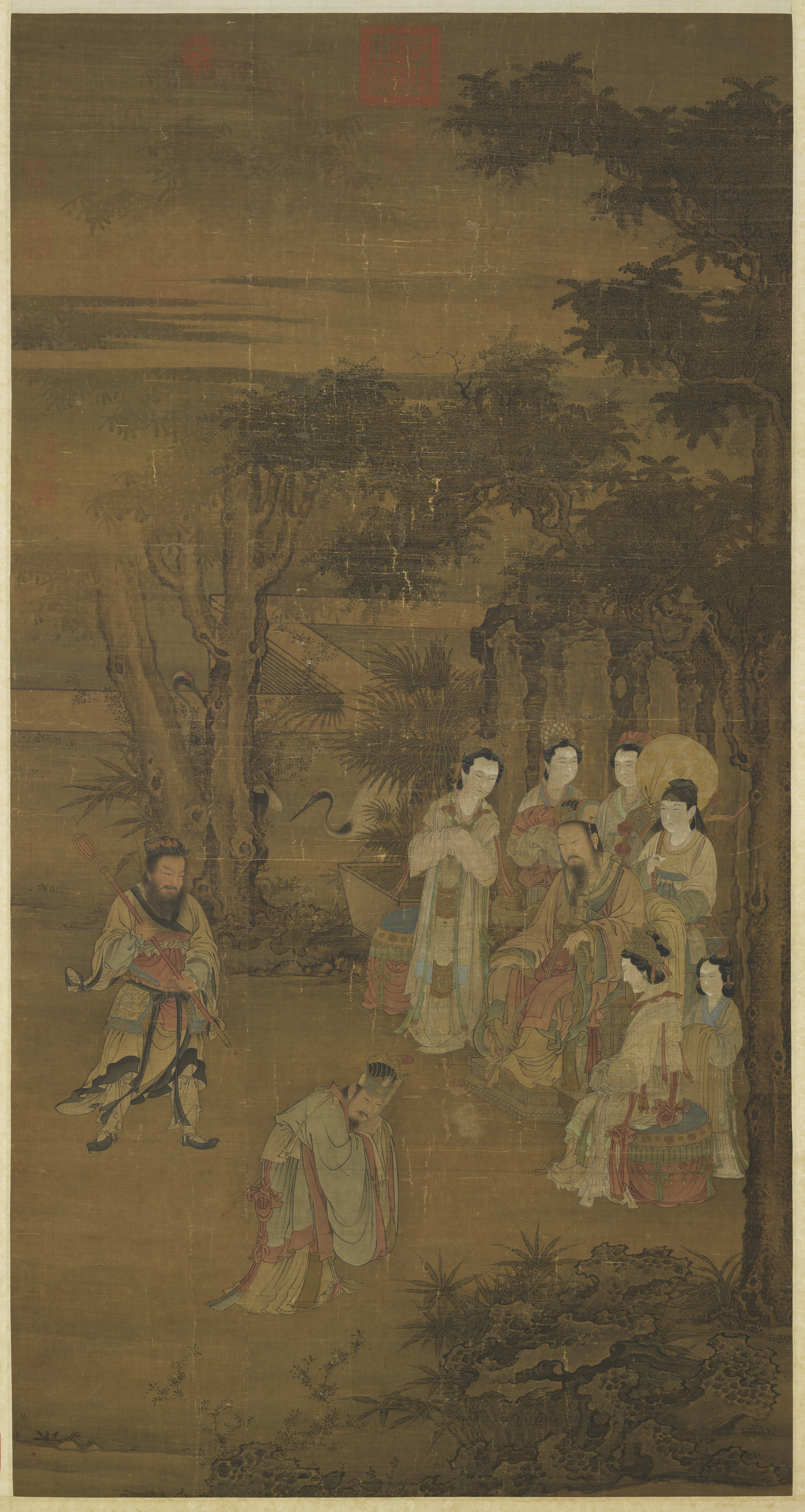
The emperor is seated and listens intently to his official Yuan Ang at Shanglin Garden.

An incident otherwise uncharacteristic of Emperor Wen occurred in 176 BCE. Zhou Bo, who had been instrumental in Emperor Wen's becoming emperor and who had by that point retired to his March of Jiang (絳, in modern Linfen, Shanxi), was falsely accused of treason. Instead of doing initial investigations first, Emperor Wen had Zhou arrested and incarcerated. It was only with the intercession of his mother Empress Dowager Bo and his daughter Princess Changping (昌平公主, Zhou's daughter-in-law) that Zhou was released, and the charges against him dismissed.

In 175 BCE, over the objections of Jia Yi, Emperor Wen issued an edict permitting any person to mint money (then only in the form of coins) out of copper and tin. The main beneficiaries of this policy were those with access to copper, including the court official Deng Tong (鄧通), a favorite of Emperor Wen, who bestowed upon Deng a major copper mine in Yandao (嚴道, in modern Yaan, Sichuan). Another beneficiary was Liu Pi, the Prince of Wu, whose principality had a major copper mine at Yuzhang (豫章, in modern Nanchang, Jiangxi).

In 174 BCE, a major incident occurred involving Liu Chang, the Prince of Chen, who was by then Emperor Wen's only living brother. Emperor Wen had great affection for him and did not punish him for using styles and ceremonies that only emperors were supposed to use. Also, contrary to imperial laws, Prince Chang issued edicts within his own principality and also commissioned his own prime minister. He also carried out executions and made titles for people—two powers that were also reserved to the emperor.

Emperor Wen constantly excused him for his indiscretions—which included killing Shen Yiji (審食其), the Marquess of Piyang—but eventually became unhappy. He asked his uncle Bo Zhao (薄昭) to write a letter to Prince Chang to try to change his ways. Instead, Prince Chang was offended and planned a rebellion. When the conspiracy was discovered, Emperor Wen stripped Prince Chang of his title and exiled him to Yandao—with the intent to teach him a lesson and then summoning him back. However, on the way, Prince Chang died—probably by suicide. In 172 BCE, Emperor Wen, missing Prince Chang dearly and still lamenting his death, made his sons Liu An, Liu Bo (劉勃), Liu Ci (劉賜), and Liu Liang (劉良) marquesses, again over Jia Yi's objection.

Also in 174 BCE, when the Xiongnu's new chanyu Laoshang came to power, Emperor Wen continued the heqin policy by giving him a prince's daughter in marriage.

In 170 BCE, Emperor Wen's uncle Bo Zhao, who had been instrumental in his administration, killed an imperial messenger. Emperor Wen forced him to commit suicide. This incident drew criticism from later historians, who believed that he should have curbed Bo's powers earlier and saved his life in that manner.

In 169 BCE, Chao Cuo (晁錯), then a low-level official, offered Emperor Wen a number of suggestions for dealing with the Xiongnu. Emperor Wen was impressed, and made him a member of Crown Prince Qi's household. At Chao's suggestion, in 168 BCE, Emperor Wen instituted the policy that if people contributed food for use by the northern defense force against Xiongnu, they could receive titles or have their crimes pardoned.

In 167 BCE, Emperor Wen banned the corporal punishments of facial tattoo and cutting off the nose or a foot, and replaced them with whipping. These punishments would not be instituted again as a matter of formal legal sentencing for the rest of Chinese history. (However, as was later noted, this actually caused more deaths, and so the amount of whipping was further reduced in 156 BCE by Emperor Jing.)

=== Late reign ===
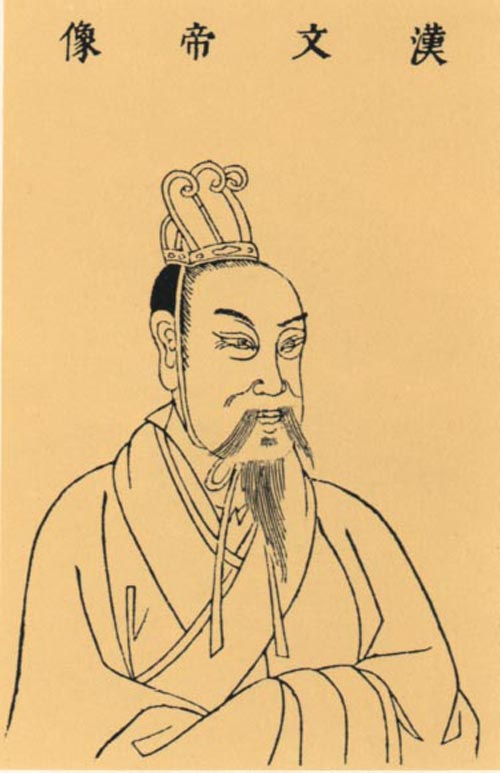
Emperor Wen of Han from the Sancai Tuhui

Later in his reign, Emperor Wen became superstitious and started to search for supernatural events. In 165 BCE, at the instigation of the sorcerer Xinyuan Ping (新垣平), he built a temple north of Wei River dedicated to five gods. He then promoted Xinyuan and awarded him with much treasure. At Xinyuan's suggestion, Emperor Wen planned a thorough revision of the governmental system and the building of many temples. In 164 BCE, Xinyuan Ping had an associate place a jade cup outside the imperial palace with mysterious writings on them, and also predicted a regression in the path of the sun. (This phenomenon has never been adequately explained, but might have actually been a partial solar eclipse.) In response, Emperor Wen joyously proclaimed an empire-wide festival and also restarted the calendaring for his reign. (Therefore, the years 163 BCE and on, for the rest of his reign, were known as the later era of his reign.) However, in winter 164 BCE, Xinyuan was exposed to be a fraud, and he and his clan were executed. That ended Emperor Wen's period of supernatural fascination.

In 158 BCE, when the Xiongnu made a major incursion into the Commanderies of Shang (上, modern northern Shaanxi) and Yunzhong (雲中, modern western Inner Mongolia, centered on Hohhot), Emperor Wen made a visit to the camps of armies preparing to defend the capital Chang'an against a potential Xiongnu attack. It was on this occasion that he became impressed with Zhou Bo's son Zhou Yafu as a military commander; compared to the other generals, who, upon the emperor's arrival, dropped all things and did what they could to make the emperor feel welcome, Zhou remained on military alert and required the imperial guards to submit to proper military order before he would allow the imperial train to enter. Later, he would leave instructions for Crown Prince Qi that if military emergencies arose, he should make Zhou his commander of armed forces—instructions that were heeded during the Rebellion of the Seven States.

Emperor Wen died in summer 157 BCE. He was succeeded by Crown Prince Qi. Emperor Wen, in his will, reduced the usual mourning period to three days, contrary to the previous lengthy periods of mourning in which weddings, sacrifices, drinking, and the consumption of meat were disallowed, thus greatly reducing the burden on the people. He also ordered that his concubines be allowed to return home. (Before and after Emperor Wen, generally, imperial concubines without children were required to guard the emperor's tomb for the rest of their lives.)

== Legacy ==
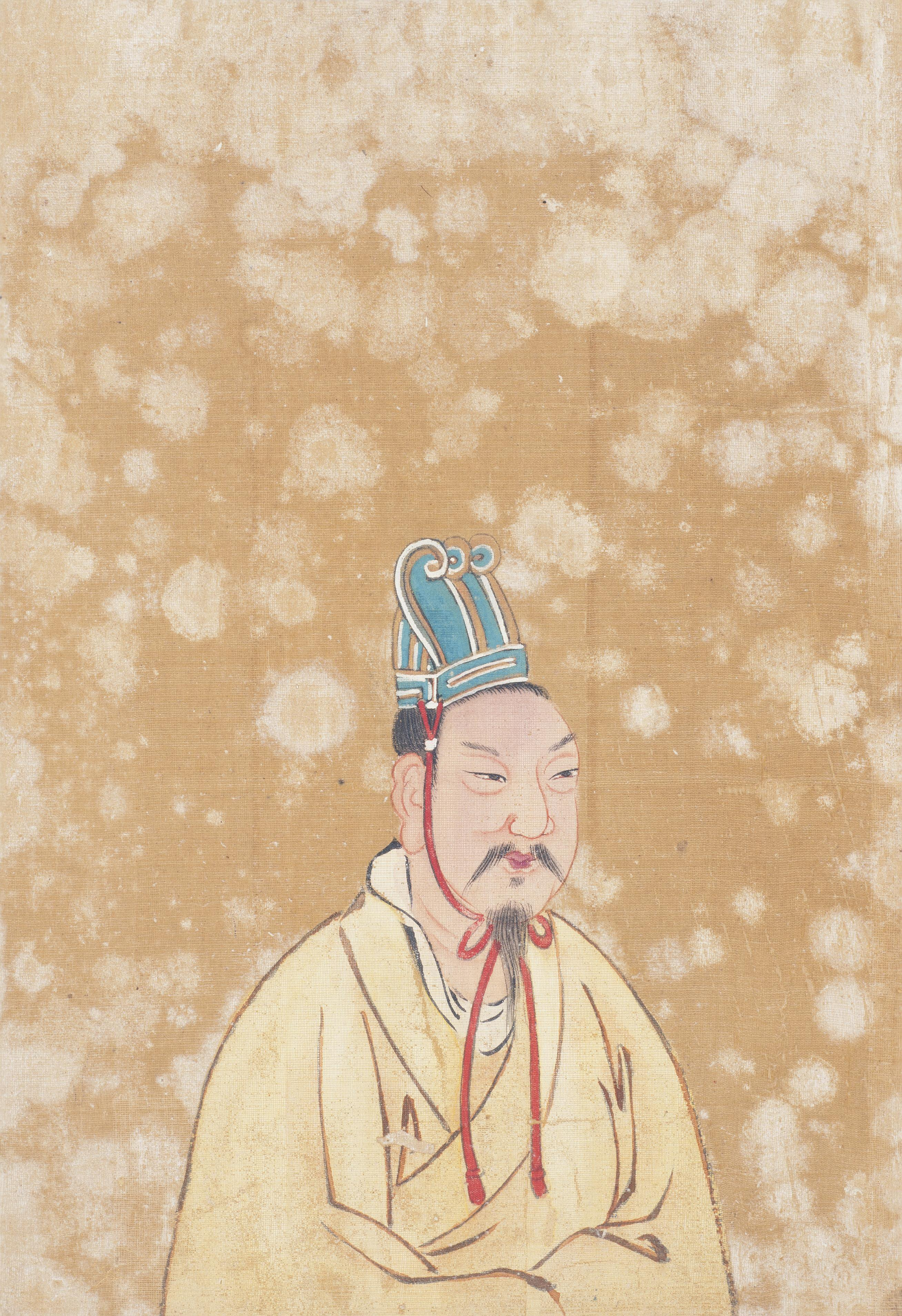
As depicted in the album Portraits of Famous Men c. 1900, housed in the Philadelphia Museum of Art

Emperor Wen's reign and that of his son Emperor Jing were often collectively known together as the "Rule of Wen and Jing", renowned for general stability and relaxed laws. He was considered one of the most benevolent rulers in Chinese history. His reign was marked by thriftiness and attempts to reduce burdens on the people, with one of the lowest tax rate in Chinese history was recorded. Two years after his death, the tax rate was as low as 3.3% of one's personal income. Wen was buried in the Baling mausoleum, which took two groups of sixteen thousand and fifteen thousand workers.

The benevolent way of ruling of Emperor Wen was influenced by the philosophy of Confucianism. Confucian scholar Jia Yi was the mastermind behind Emperor Wen's policy. He strongly emphasized the importance of agriculture, as well as egalitarian wealth distribution, according to the doctrines of Confucius.

Emperor Wen was also noted for his filial piety, and he was listed as one of The Twenty-four Filial Exemplars. According to one story, Emperor Wen's mother fell ill for three years, and Emperor Wen tended her whenever he was available. He also personally tasted all the soups and medicines that were served for his mother's treatment first to make sure they were adequate before serving them to his mother.

== Era names ==
These "era names" are not true "era names", but are retrospective, in the sense that the era-name system, as instituted by Emperor Wen's grandson Emperor Wu, had not yet come into effect. Emperor Wen, in accordance with prior imperial calendrical systems, would have simply referred to the number of years in his reign. But he reset the calendar once at the persuasion of the sorcerer Xinyuan Ping (新垣平), thus historians need to refer to the eras before and after the resetting separately.

- Qianyuan (前元, "Former Era") 179 BCE – 164 BCE
- Houyuan (後元, "Later Era") 163 BCE – 157 BCE

== Family ==
- Princess consort, of the Lü clan (王后 呂氏)
  - Four unnamed sons
- Empress Xiaowen, of the Dou clan (孝文皇后 竇氏; d. 135 BCE), personal name Yifang (漪房)
  - Eldest Princess Guantao (館陶公主; 189–116 BCE), personal name Piao (嫖), first daughter
    - Married Chen Wu, Marquis Tangyi (陳午; d. 130 BC), and had issue (two sons, Empress Chen)
  - Liu Qi, Emperor Xiaojing (孝景皇帝 劉啟; 188–141 BCE), first son
  - Liu Wu, Prince Xiao of Liang (梁孝王 劉武; 184–144 BCE), second son
- Furen, of the Shen clan (夫人 慎氏)
- Unknown
  - Liu Can, Prince Xiao of Dai (代孝王 劉參; d. 162 BCE), third son
  - Liu Yi, Prince Huai of Liang (梁懷王 劉揖; d. 169 BCE), fourth son
  - Princess Changping (昌平公主), second daughter
    - Married Zhou Shengzhi (周勝之), Marquis Jiangwu, a son of Zhou Bo, in 169 BCE

== Ancestry ==
Liu Taigong (282–197 BCE)
Emperor Gaozu of Han (256–195 BCE)
Empress Zhaoling
Emperor Wen of Han (203–157 BCE)
Empress Gao (d. 155 BCE)
Lady Wei

== See also ==
- Zhai Gong

== Bibliography ==
=== Early ===
- Book of Han, vol. 4. (in Chinese) in "Chapter IV: The Annals of [Emperor Hsiao]-Wen". The History of the Former Han Dynasty. Vol. 3 vols. Translated by Dubs, Homer H. Baltimore: Waverly Press. 1938–1955.
- Gu Yanwu (2017), Johnston, Ian (ed.), Record of Daily Knowledge and Collected Poems and Essays, Translations from the Asian Classics, New York: Columbia University Press, ISBN 9780231542678.
- Zizhi Tongjian 資治通鑑 [Comprehensive Mirror in Aid of Governance] (in Simplified Chinese). Vol. 12, 13, 14, 15. Compiled by Sima Guang (1084).
- Sima Qian; et al., Records of the Grand Historian, vol. Vol. 10. (in Chinese) in Watson, Burton, trans. Records of the Grand Historian. 3 vols. New York: Columbia University Press, 1961.

=== Modern ===
- Barbieri-Low, Anthony J.; Yates, Robin D.S. (2015). Law, State, and Society in Early Imperial China. Sinica Leidensia. Vol. 1. Leiden: Brill Publishers. ISBN 978-90-04-30053-8.
- Kinney, Anne Behnke (2004). Representations of childhood and youth in early China. Redwood City: Stanford University Press. ISBN 978-0-8047-4731-8.
- Loewe, Michael (1986). "The Former Han Dynasty". In Twitchett, Denis; Loewe, Michael (eds.). The Cambridge History of China: Volume I: the Ch'in and Han Empires, 221 B.C. – A.D. 220. Cambridge: Cambridge University Press. pp. 103–222. ISBN 978-0-521-24327-8.
- Loewe, Michael (2000). A Biographical Dictionary of the Qin, Former Han and Xin Periods (221 BC - AD 24). Leiden: Brill Publishers. ISBN 978-90-04-10364-1.
- Loewe, Michael (2004). The Men Who Governed Han China: Companion to a Biographical Dictionary of the Qin, Former Han and Xin Periods. Leiden: Brill Publishers. ISBN 978-90-04-13845-2.
- Loewe, Michael (2010). "Imperial tombs". In Loewe, Michael; Nylan, Michael (eds.). China's Early Empires: A Re-appraisal. Cambridge: Cambridge University Press. ISBN 978-0-521-85297-5.
- Paludan, Ann (1998). Chronicle of the Chinese Emperors: The Reign-by-Reign Record of the Rulers of Imperial China. London: Thames & Hudson. ISBN 978-0-500-05090-3.
- Xiong, Victor Cunrui; Hammond, Kenneth J. (2019). Routledge Handbook of Imperial Chinese History. London: Routledge. ISBN 978-0-367-58051-3.
- Yu, Ying-shih (1986). "Han foreign relations". In Twitchett, Denis; Loewe, Michael (eds.). The Cambridge History of China: Volume I: the Ch'in and Han Empires, 221 B.C. – A.D. 220. Cambridge: Cambridge University Press. pp. 103–222. ISBN 978-0-521-24327-8.
- "Wendi | emperor of the Han dynasty". Encyclopædia Britannica. Chicago: Encyclopædia Britannica, Inc. 30 March 2016.

Emperor Wen of Han House of Liu Born: 200 BCE Died: 157 BCE
Regnal titles
Preceded by Emperor Houshao of Han	Emperor of China; Western Han; 179–157 BCE	Succeeded by Emperor Jing of Han
