= Dishu system =

Former Chinese legal and moral system

Dishu (Chinese: 嫡庶) was an important legal and moral system involving marriage and inheritance in the Chinese cultural sphere.

In pre-modern eras, upper-class men in China, Japan, Korea, and Vietnam often had more than one spouse to ensure the birth of a male heir to their assets and titles. In China, a priority system was created to rank the offsprings' entitlement to this inheritance. Under this system, a man was allowed one official wife, called a zhengshi (正室, pronounced seishitsu in Japanese, lit. "formal household") or di wife (嫡妻), and her son was called the di son (嫡子). A woman would have to go through a formal wedding to become the di wife, otherwise she would be considered a concubine of her husband. A man could only have one di wife unless he had already divorced another. In the Tang dynasty, any man who had more than one di wife would be considered to be bigamous and would be liable to one year of penal labor. The woman involved would also receive a slightly less severe punishment unless she could prove she had been cheated into the marriage. In either case, the marriage would be annulled.

A secondary spouse was called a ceshi (側室, lit. "side household") or shu wife (庶妻). A man might participate in a small ritual, or no ceremony, to take on a shu wife. Several shu wives were allowed for one man at the same time according to the law. A shu wife‘s son was called the shu son (庶子). Shu sons had to regard the Di wife of their father as their mother and respect her. Their birth mother would be called yiniang (姨娘, lit. "aunt"). Based on social standards, the di wife's major responsibilities were managing all shu wives and taking care of them like her younger sisters. However, if shu wives did not show respect to the di wife, then she had the right to punish them.

Di sons, regardless of their age, held much higher social status than the shu sons, and the eldest di son (嫡長子) held the paramount position over all other children of the house. An illegitimate son, born out of wedlock, was generally categorized as a shu son, though he would have much lower status than those born to legitimate shu wives. Tang dynasty law prescribed that if a di son died, his eldest di son (di grandson) should be the successor, taking precedence over all other members of the family; if a di grandson could not be found, the di son's next full-brother (born of the same zhengshi mother) should be the successor. If no di offspring were available, a shu son could be considered.

During most of the history of Imperial China, a man could not divorce or demote a zhengshi wife (以妻為妾) unless she had committed one of "seven misconducts for divorce" (七出).

1. Unfilial conducts (不順父母) — considered a sin as it was "immoral" (逆德)
2. Incapable of bearing sons (無子) — considered a sin as it "threatened bloodlines" (絕世)
3. Promiscuity (淫) — considered a sin as it "disrupted clan" (亂族)
4. Jealousy (妒) — considered a sin as it "disrupted family" (亂家)
5. Having severe illness (有惡疾) — considered a sin as it "hindered family rituals" (不可共粢盛)
6. Excessive gossiping (口多言) — considered a sin as it "instigated discord among relatives" (離親)
7. Theft (竊盜) — considered a sin as it was "against common good" (反義)

However, there were three conditions, known as "three exceptions" (三不去), that forbade a man from ever divorcing his wife even if she did commit any of the above seven sins.

1. The wife has no parental family to return to after divorce (有所娶無所歸)
2. The wife has served three years of filial mourning for deceased parent(s)-in-law (與更三年喪)
3. The husband was poor upon marriage but now wealthy (前貧賤後富貴)

Tang law prescribed that a man caught demoting his zhengshi wife to ceshi without good cause would be sentenced to two years of penal labor, and the zhengshi wife's status would be restored. Any man who divorced his wife without legitimate reasons (the above-mentioned "seven misconducts") would be subjected to eighteen months of penal labor, and a further 100 strokes of the cane if he violated the wife's protection under the "three exceptions".

After the Song dynasty, the difference between social status of di and shu wives/sons decreased.
