= Emperor Hui of Han =

Emperor of the Han dynasty from 195 to 188 BC

Emperor Hui of Han 漢惠帝
- Huangdi (皇帝)

Emperor of the Han dynasty
- Reign: 1 June 195 – 26 September 188 BC
- Predecessor: Emperor Gaozu
- Successor: Emperor Qianshao
- Regent: Empress Lü
- Born: Liu Ying (劉盈); 210 BC; Pei County, Qin dynasty
- Died: 26 September 188 BC (aged 22); Chang'an, Han dynasty
- Burial: An Mausoleum (安陵)
- Spouse: Empress Xiaohui
- Issue: Emperor Qianshao of Han; Emperor Houshao of Han
Names
- Family name: Liu (劉); Given name: Ying (盈)
Temple name
- Huizong
- House: Liu
- Dynasty: Han (Western Han)
- Father: Emperor Gaozu
- Mother: Empress Gao

Liu Ying
- Traditional Chinese: 劉盈
- Simplified Chinese: 刘盈
Transcriptions
Standard Mandarin
- Hanyu Pinyin: Liú Yíng
- IPA: [ljǒʊ pǐŋ]
Yue: Cantonese
- Yale Romanization: Làuh Yìhng
Southern Min
- Hokkien POJ: Lâu êng
- Tâi-lô: Lâu îng

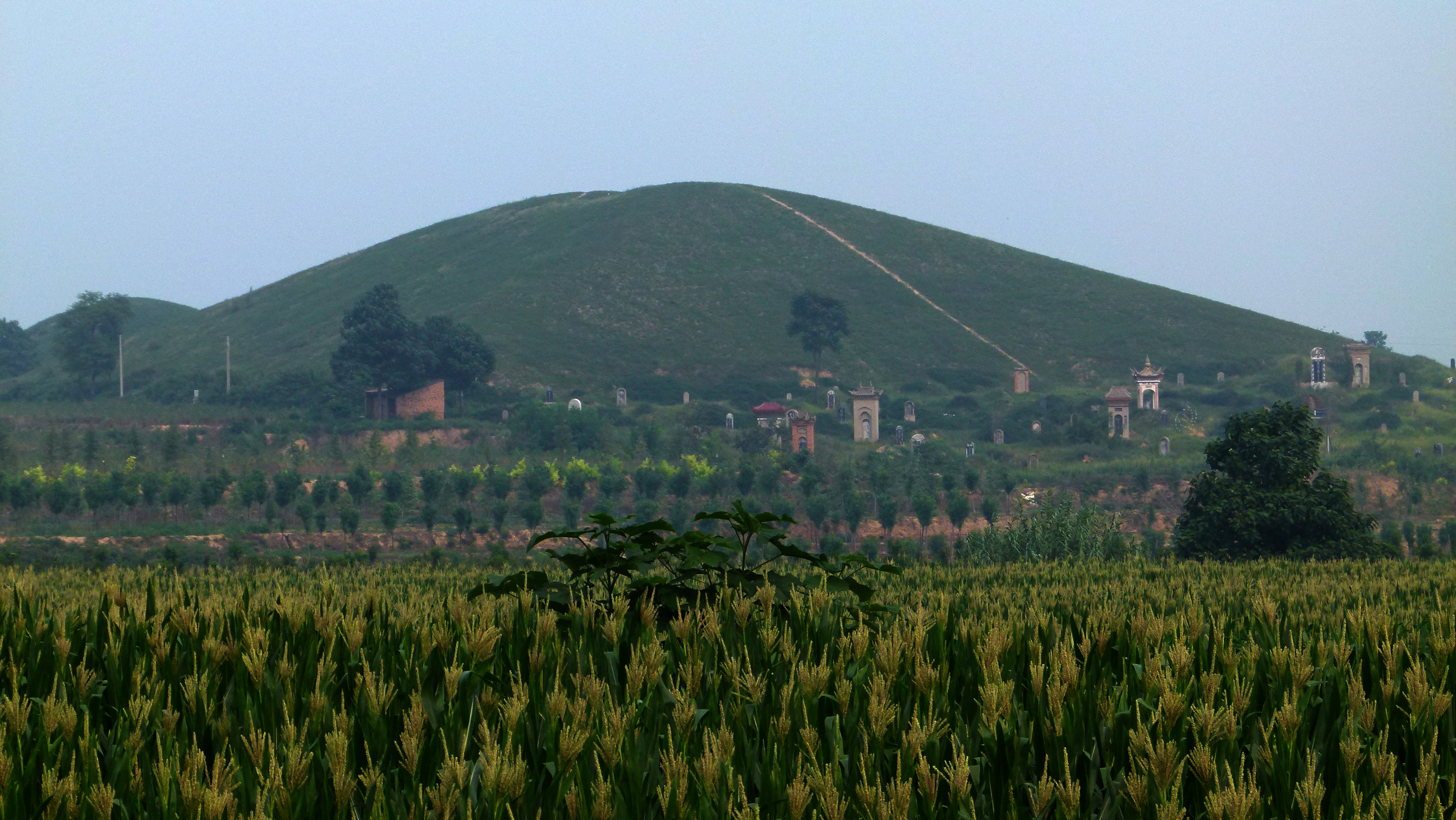
Anling (安陵), the tomb of Han Huidi, in Xianyang, Shaanxi

Emperor Hui of Han (Chinese: 漢惠帝; pinyin: Hàn Huìdì; 210 BC – 26 September 188 BC), born Liu Ying (劉盈), was the second emperor of the Han dynasty. He was the second son of Emperor Gaozu, the first Han emperor, and the only son of Empress Lü from the powerful Lü clan. Emperor Hui is generally remembered as a somewhat weak character dominated and terrorized by his mother, Empress Lü, who became Empress Dowager when her husband died after being wounded in a war she had encouraged him to personally take command in.

Huidi was personally kind and well-intentioned, simple, hesitant, soft-hearted and generous, unable to escape the impact of his mother's viciousness. He tried to protect his younger half-brother Ruyi, Prince Yin of Zhao from being murdered by Empress Dowager Lü, but failed. After that, he indulged himself in drinking and sex, gave up government affairs to his mother, and died at a relatively young age. Emperor Hui's wife was Empress Zhang Yan, a niece of his by his elder sister Princess Yuan of Lu; their marriage was the result of insistence by Empress Dowager Lü and was a childless one. After Emperor Hui died without a designated heir, Empress Dowager Lü installed two of his alleged sons whom she adopted into her clan, Emperor Qianshao of Han and Liu Hong, sons of one or more of the Emperor's concubines. They and the rest of the Lü clan were exterminated in the wake of the ensuing Lü Clan disturbance, and Emperor Hui's half-brother Liu Heng was established as Emperor Wen.

== Early life and years as crown prince ==
=== Early years ===
Liu Ying was born during the Qin dynasty. Liu Ying's childhood is not completely clear. His father Liu Bang would after Liu Ying's birth go on to found the Han dynasty, and later given the posthumous name of Han Gaodi (emperor Gao of Han). What is known is that Liu Ying was not Liu Bang's oldest son—that would be Liu Fei, who would later be made the Prince of Qi. However, Liu Ying was considered to be the proper heir because his mother, the later Empress Lü, was Liu Bang's wife, while Liu Fei's mother was either a concubine or a mistress who was with Liu Bang before he became King of Han.

=== Chu–Han Contention ===
During Chu–Han Contention, while Liu Bang fought a five-year war with Xiang Yu for supremacy over the Chinese world, his mother, his sister, and he did not initially follow his father to the Principality of Han (modern Sichuan, Chongqing, and southern Shaanxi); rather, they stayed in his father's home territory, perhaps in his home town of Pei (沛縣, in modern Xuzhou, Jiangsu) deep in Xiang's Principality of Western Chu, presumably with his grandfather Liu Taigong.

=== Father Liu's big setback ===
In 205 BC, Liu Bang appeared to be near total victory, having captured Xiang's capital of Pengcheng. How his family received this news was unclear, but a few months later, when Xiang responded and crushed Liu's forces, Liu fled and, in his flight, attempted to pass through his hometown to take his family with him. He was able to find his children and carry them along with him, but his father and wife were captured by Xiang's forces and kept as hostages—and would not be returned to him until Liu and Xiang temporarily made peace in 203 BC. The then-very young Liu Ying must have then spent these days not knowing what the eventual fate of his grandfather and mother would be.

=== Father Liu's big victory ===
After Liu Bang's victory and self-declaration as the emperor (later known as Emperor Gao), thus establishing the Han dynasty, in 202 BC, he made his wife empress and Liu Ying, as his proper heir, crown prince. Thus, Liu Ying became the first crown prince in Chinese imperial history. Under the title of Ying Taizi ("Crown Prince Ying"), he was considered to be kind and tolerant, characteristics that Emperor Gao did not like. Rather, he favored his young son Liu Ruyi, whom he considered to be more like him and whose mother, Consort Qi, was his favorite concubine. With the support of the officials and the Four Whiteheads of Mount Shang, Prince Ying's status as heir survived despite Consort Qi's machinations.

=== Four Whiteheads of Mount Shang ===
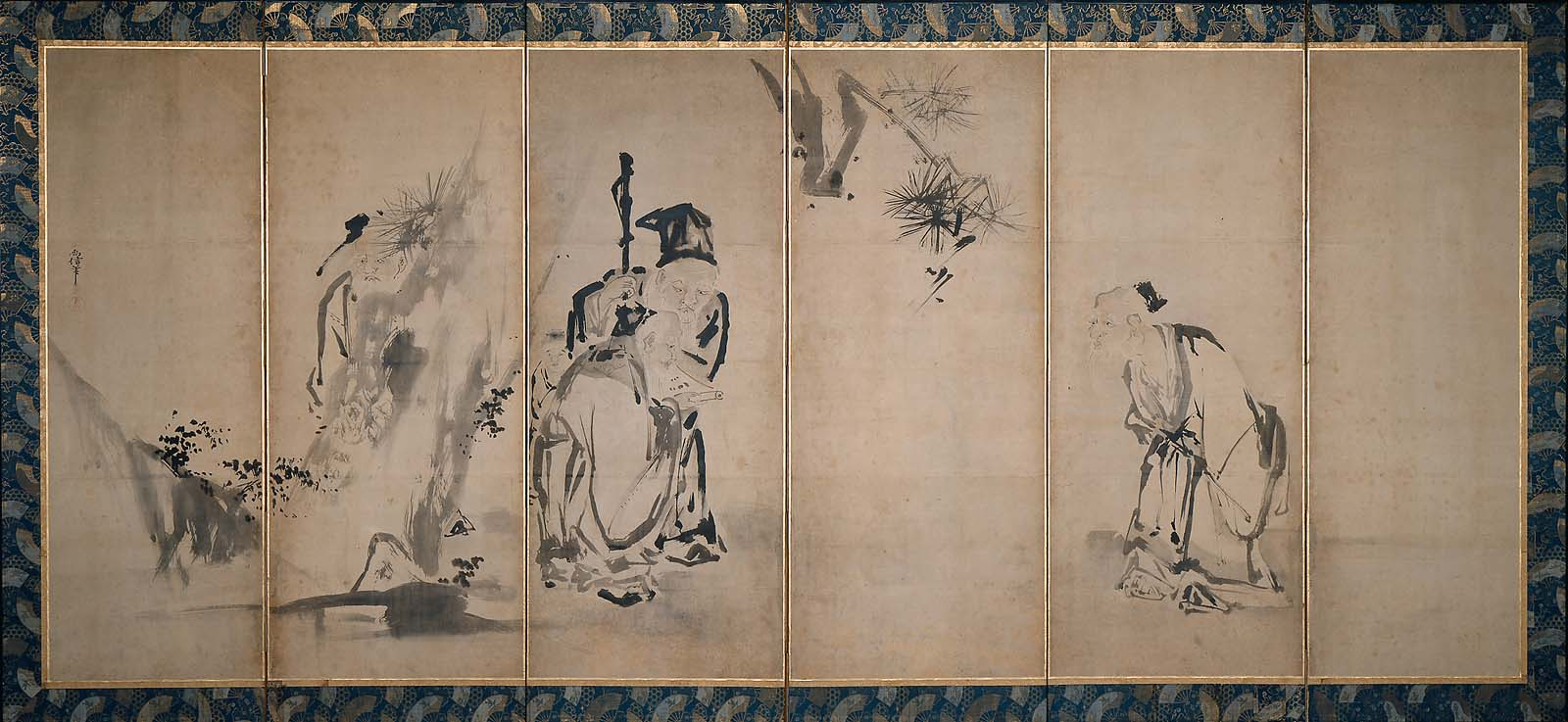
Kanō Naonobu (17th century): "The Four Sages of Mount Shang"

Soon after establishing the Han dynasty, the new emperor, Gaodi, was eager to recruit talented persons. In 196 BCE, Gao even issued a decree to the effect that any official knowing of a virtuous man must so report on penalty of being fired (unless they were too old or sick). Sometime before or after that, Gao attempted to obtain the services of the Four Whiteheads of Mount Shang: Master Dongyuan, Qi Liji, Master Xiahuang and Mr. Lu Li. During the time of troubles which characterized the Qin dynasty, these four had entered into a life of seclusion on Mount Shang. They were old and had white hair and beards. Thus, they were known as the Four Whiteheads of Mount Shang. Liu Bang was well aware of the reputation of these four sages, and when he became emperor Gao, the four refused his ardent entreaties to assume positions of importance in his newly established government. When the question of who was to be imperial heir came up, two of Gaodi's women both advocated for their own son: Lü for Ying and Qi for her own son. Gao favored Qi's son, as he thought the youth embodied more of his personality. Lü Hou got the advantage: she went to the powerful official Zhang Liang, who said, “His Majesty had long heard about the Four Whiteheads of Mount Shang and wanted to invite them to serve the country. However, they refused. If the Crown Prince could obtain the support of the Four Whiteheads of Mount Shang, then His Majesty would not depose him.” Lü Hou then applied her forces of persuasion. The Four Whiteheads of Mount Shang showed up at court. The four agreed that according to the Confucian precepts of filial piety, as the elder son the future Huidi should succeed to the rulership. Furthermore, Liu Ying's nature was benevolent and compassionate. Gaodi noticed the presence of four elders with white hair and white beards at his court, and inquired as to their identity. Upon finding out who they were and what their position was, Gaodi went to Lady Qi and told her: “I cannot appoint your son as the successor because the Crown Prince has already obtained the support of such capable people. His position is firmly entrenched.” (Note: In his Zizhi Tongjian Kaoyi, Sima Guang was skeptical of this account. He opinioned that given Liu Bang's tenacious personality, he would not easily change his mind due to criticism from others; the main reason why Liu Bang did not make Liu Ruyi taizi was that Liu Bang feared that after his death, Ruyi would not be able to receive support from court officials. If Liu Bang really wanted to make Ruyi taizi, as someone who had been close to Liu Bang for many years, Zhang Liang was right in his observation that it would take more than a few words to change Liu Bang's mind; so, how can a few words from four old men of the woods convince Liu Bang? If the "Four Whiteheads" could affect the succession, Liu Bang would have killed them, and not lament to Lady Qi. Also, even if the "Four Whiteheads" did convince Liu Bang to alter the succession, it would be an example of Zhang Liang providing assistance to Liu Ruyi against the latter's father, which is something Zhang would not have done. Thus, Sima did not include the account of the "Four Whiteheads" in Zizhi Tongjian, just like he did not include the account of Qin not attacking the Hangu Pass for 15 years after Su Qin had canvassed the other Six States, and the account of the Qin army retreating for 50 li after Lu Zhonglian persuaded Xinyuan Yan. Sima Guang also criticized Sima Qian for including these three accounts in his Shiji due to the latter's propensity in believing incredible accounts.)

=== Empress Lü: Growing ascendancy ===
As crown prince, Prince Ying, along with his mother, would be the ones who would rule on important matters at the capital in his father's absence during various campaigns. When Ying Bu rebelled in 196 BC, Emperor Gao was ill and considered sending Prince Ying as the commander of the forces against Ying Bu rather than campaigning himself, but at the suggestion of Empress Lü (who averred that the generals, who were generally Emperor Gao's old friends, might not fully obey the young prince), went on the campaign himself. Prince Ying was instead put in charge of home territories around the capital Chang'an, assisted by Confucian scholar Shusun Tong (叔孫通) and strategist Zhang Liang (張良). He appeared to carry out the tasks competently but without distinction, but his mother, Empress Lu, first received the memorials and determined what subjects would be given to her son, the crown prince. On important matters, she had to be informed and consulted for decision-making, and orders were issued with her approval.

=== Succession to the imperial power ===
Prince Ying succeeded to the throne of Han when his father died in 195 BC from complications of an arrow wound suffered during the campaign against Ying Bu, after Empress Lü had insisted on Emperor Gao personally leading the fight.

== Reign as emperor under Empress Lü's regency ==
Immediately upon Prince Ying's ascension to the throne as Emperor Hui, Empress Lü, now empress dowager, became the effective lead figure in his administration. She wanted to carry out a plot of revenge against Consort Qi and her son Ruyi. She first arrested Consort Qi and put her in prison garb (shaved head, confined by stock, and wearing red clothes). She then summoned Liu Ruyi to the capital—an attempt that was initially resisted by Ruyi's chief of staff Zhou Chang (周昌), whom she respected because he was one of the officials who insisted on Liu Ying being the rightful heir. Instead of directly moving against Zhou and Liu Ruyi, though, Lü circumvented Zhou by first summoning him to the capital, and then summoning Liu Ruyi.

Emperor Hui tried to save Liu Ruyi's life. Before Liu Ruyi could get to the capital, Emperor Hui intercepted his young brother at Bashang (霸上, in modern Xi'an) and received Liu Ruyi into his palace, and they dined and slept together. Empress Dowager Lü wanted to kill Liu Ruyi, but was afraid that any attempt might also harm her own son, and therefore could not carry out her plot for several months.

Empress Dowager Lü got her chance in c.January 194 BC. One morning, Emperor Hui was out hunting and wanted to take Liu Ruyi with him. The young prince was then only 14 years old and refused to get up from bed, and Emperor Hui left for the hunt on his own. Empress Dowager Lü heard this and immediately sent an assassin into the emperor's palace to force poisoned wine down the prince's throat. By the time that Emperor Hui returned, his brother was dead. She then had Consort Qi's eyes gouged out, made her ears deaf, drugged her to make her unable to speak and had her arms and legs cut off. The mutilated woman was thrown into a latrine and then fed and kept alive in a pig's bin and was called the "人彘", meaning literally the "human swine". (She would die from the torture.) When Emperor Hui saw his father's favorite and the mother of his beloved little brother in such a condition, he cried out loud and became depressed and sick for about a year. He told his mother that he could not govern the empire, given that he was the son of someone like her who has done such inhuman deeds. From that point, Emperor Hui only "indulged himself with wine and women" and no longer made major and key governing decisions, leaving them to his mother, and Empress Dowager Lü had so much power that Emperor Hui was ineffective.

Emperor Hui, however, continued to try to protect his siblings. In c.December 194 BC, when Liu Fei, Prince of Qi—his older half-brother—made an official visit to the capital, they both attended a feast put on by Empress Dowager Lü. Emperor Hui, honoring the prince as an older brother, asked him to take a seat at the table even more honored than his own. The empress dowager was greatly offended and instructed her servants to pour two cups of poisoned wine which were set on the table between the trio. She ordered Liu Fei to toast her, while ignoring Emperor Hui. As Liu Fei was about to drink the poisoned wine, Emperor Hui, knowing his mother's murderously jealous temperament and remembering how his other brother had died, suddenly reached for the second cup, which the Empress did not intend. (The second cup was a decoy, placed there only to suggest to Liu Fei that she would return his toast, as ritual required, although he would die immediately on drinking his, so she would not need to drink the other cup. Her resentment toward Liu Fei fully captured her attention and she did not even think of her son's presence.) Empress Dowager Lü jumped up and slapped the second cup away from Emperor Hui, spilling it. Liu Fei realized the trick and left, pretending to be already drunk. In the end, he was only able to leave the capital by offering to the Empress an entire commandery from his principality, to be the feudal estate of Princess Yuan of Lu. Empress Dowager Lü, who greatly loved her daughter as well, was pleased and let Liu Fei return to his principality.

=== Accomplishments ===
As the second emperor of his dynasty, Huidi helped to establish the Han dynasty on a strong footing: Huidi bolstered the Han dynastic aspirations by establishing shrines venerating his father throughout the land. Although his father, Gaodi, had continued many of the Qin institutions, Huidi repealed some particularly harsh Qin laws, such as the Burning of books and burying of scholars law. Nevertheless, Huidi's gentle nature was at first little match against the ruthless Lü Hou and her clan. Still, the Han dynasty was set on a firm foot as the challenging Lü clan was eventually generally exterminated and Han Huidi was effectively succeeded by Emperor Wen of Han.

== Death ==
Hui died in the autumn of 188 BC of an unspecified illness. After Empress Lü's death and the massacre of the Lü clan in 180BC, Emperor Gaozu's officials and survivors of the imperial Liu clan then chose Liu Heng as the next emperor, deliberately due to his lack of a powerful maternal clan.

== Marriage and children ==
In c.November 192 BC, Emperor Hui married Empress Zhang, a marriage that would not yield any children. However, whether Emperor Hui actually had children during or before his reign is a controversial question. The officials, including Chen Ping and Zhou Bo, who would later overthrow the Lü clan after the deaths of both Emperor Hui and Empress Dowager Lü, claimed that Emperor Hui had no sons—but that Empress Zhang, at Empress Dowager Lü's instigation, stole eight boys from other people, put their mothers to death, and made the children her own. Modern historians have split opinions on the issue, but largely believe that the boys were actually Emperor Hui's sons by concubines and that Empress Zhang did indeed put their mothers to death and make them her own children. (As, for example, Bo Yang pointed out, it would be logically incongruent, if Empress Zhang did steal these children from elsewhere, for her to put only the mothers but not the fathers to death.) Under this theory, the officials denied the imperial ancestry of these children in fear of the fact that they were also descendants of Empress Dowager Lü and her clan, and therefore might if allowed to live eventually to seek vengeance for the slaughter of the Lü clan—a reason that they themselves admitted. Except for Emperor Qianshao (who was deposed and executed by Empress Dowager Lü), the other children either died young by natural causes or were executed by the officials after they made Liu Heng, the Prince of Dai (Emperor Wen) the emperor.

== Family ==
- Empress Xiaohui, of the Zhang clan (孝惠皇后 張氏; 202–163 BC), niece, personal name Yan (嫣)
- Unknown
  - Emperor Qianshao of Han, Emperor (皇帝; 193–184 BC)
  - Liu Qiang, Prince Huai of Huaiyang (淮陽懷王 劉強; d. 183 BC)
  - Liu Buyi, Prince Ai of Hengsha (恆山哀王 劉不疑; d. 186 BC)
  - Liu Hong, Emperor (皇帝 劉弘; 190–180 BC)
  - Liu Chao, Prince of Hengshan (恆山王 劉朝; d. 180 BC)
  - Liu Wu, Prince of Huaiyang (淮陽王 劉武; d. 180 BC)
  - Liu Tai, Prince of Liang (梁王 劉太; d. 180 BC)

== See also ==
- Family tree of the Han dynasty

== Reference citations ==
=== Classical Chinese secondary reference sources ===
These Classical Chinese historical sources are standard, and incorporated herein:

- Sima Tan and Sima Qian. Records of the Grand Historian, vol. 9 (on or around 94 BCE).
- Ban Biao, Ban Gu, and Ban Zhao. Book of Han, vol. 2 (111 CE).
- Sima Guang, et al. Zizhi Tongjian (Comprehensive Mirror in Aid of Governance), vols. 9, 11, 12 (1084).

=== Other references ===
Emperor Hui of Han House of Liu Born: 210 BC Died: 188 BC
Regnal titles
Preceded by Emperor Gaozu of Han	Emperor of China; Western Han; 195 BC – 188 BC with Empress Dowager Lü (195–188 BC)	Succeeded by Emperor Qianshao of Han
