= The Emperor in Han Dynasty =

2005 Chinese television series

- DVD cover art
- Also known as: The Emperor Han Wu
- Traditional Chinese: 漢武大帝
- Simplified Chinese: 汉武大帝
- Literal meaning: Great Emperor Wu of Han
- Hanyu Pinyin: Hàn Wǔ Dà Dì
- Genre: Historical drama
- Written by: Jiang Qitao
- Directed by: Hu Mei; Yang Jun; Sai Fu
- Presented by: Zhu Tong; Yang Buting; Li Bolun; Wang Songshan
- Starring: Chen Baoguo; Gua Ah-leh; Lin Jing; Jiao Huang; Yang Tongshu; Tao Hong
- Theme music composer: Zhang Hongguang; Ruan Kunshen
- Opening theme: Zuihou De Qingsu (最后的倾诉) performed by Han Lei
- Ending theme: Dengdai (等待) performed by Han Lei
- Composer: Asia Philharmonic Orchestra
- Country of origin: China
- Original language: Mandarin
- No. of episodes: 58

Production
- Executive producers: Jiang Tao; Wang Guohui; Liu Dehong; Song Zhenshan; Luo Liping; Huo Qi
- Producers: Han Sanping; Wu Hongliang; Hu Mei
- Production location: China
- Cinematography: Chi Xiaoning; Zhang Yuefu; Cui Weidong; Niu Guotai
- Editors: Liu Miaomiao; Zhao Kun
- Running time: 45 minutes per episode
- Production companies: China Film Group Corporation; CCTV; 21st Century Hero Film Investments; Beijing Hualubaina Film & TV; Shanghai Jinde Films

Original release
- Network: CCTV

The Emperor in Han Dynasty, also released under the title The Emperor Han Wu in some countries, is a 2005 Chinese historical drama television series based on the life of Emperor Wu of the Han dynasty. It uses the historical texts Records of the Grand Historian and Book of Han as its source material.

== Plot ==
The series covers the life of Emperor Wu from his early childhood to his death and some events in the reign of Emperor Jing (Emperor Wu's father and predecessor), such as the Rebellion of the Seven States. It follows the conflicts that defined the pivotal war between the Han Empire and the Xiongnu, and depicts the major victories that the Han scored over the Xiongnu during Emperor Wu's reign. Prominent historical figures such as the generals Li Guang, Wei Qing and Huo Qubing, as well as the diplomats Su Wu and Zhang Qian, also make appearances as supporting characters in the series.

== Cast ==
Note: Some cast members played multiple roles. The roles are separated by a slash.

- Chen Baoguo as Emperor Wu
  - Du Chun as older teenage Emperor Wu
  - Bai Yu as younger teenage Emperor Wu
  - Wan Changhao as child Emperor Wu
- Jiao Huang as Emperor Jing
- Gua Ah-leh as Empress Dowager Dou
- Song Xiaoying as Empress Wang
- Tao Hong as Liu Ling
- Lin Jing as Wei Zifu
- Wang Wang as Sima Qian
- Yang Tongshu as Princess Pingyang / Jin Su
- Ma Shaohua as Dou Ying
- Xu Zuming as Zhou Yafu
- Chang Shih as Tian Fen
- Guo Xiao'an as Guan Fu
- Shen Baoping as Liu Wu, Prince of Liang
- Sun Feihu as Han Anguo
- Su Xiaoming as Liu Piao
- Xu Hongna as Empress Chen
- Lu Jianmin as Wei Qing
- Yang Lixiao as Princess Linlü
- Zhu Yi as Chao Cuo
- Sun Jifeng as Liu Wu (Prince of Chu)
- Chen Weidong as Liu Rong
  - Sanmao as young Liu Rong
- Zhao Xuelian as Princess Nangong
  - Luoqin Yingge as young Princess Nangong
- Li Danjun as Chuntuo
- Jian Dan as Consort Su
- Liu Sha as Empress Bo
- Ma Yong as Han Yan
- Zhang Guoqing as Chen Jia
- Wang Yanjing as Su Ben
- Su Chongshan as Liu Pi (Prince of Wu)
- Chen Jinhui as Liu Ang (Prince of Jiaoxi) / Shi Qing
- Gao Fa as Ichise Chanyu
- Chen Changhai as Zhonghang Yue
- Li Le as Huo Qubing
- Zhao Shuijing as Liu Ju
- Zhang Jialiang as Liu Tong
- Li Shiji as Prince of Dongyue / Prince of Minyue
- Lu Ying as Han Tuidang
- Wang Jingyi as Qiuxiang
- Bo Hong as Queen of Yuezhi
- Yan Jie as Zhao Xin (Ahu'er) / Jumeng
- Mengmeng as Chun'er
- Lin Zi as Xiaoqing
- Zhou Yingping as Ling'er
- Wang Wei as Prefect of Yongxiang
- Zhu Xianmin as Jifu
- Lin Zhonghua as Chao Cuo's father
- Xu Ming as Luan Bu
- Lu Shuming as Li Guang
- Chen Youwang as Wei Wan
- Zhao Gang as Yuan Ang / King of Dong'ou
- Li Ping as Gongsun Gui
- Hu Miao as Qian'er
- Gao Yicheng as Su Qing
- Yang Jun as Yang Sheng
- Tong Zhongqi as Zhi Du
- Yang Yazhou as Zheng Huaiguo
- Bo Guanjun as Ji An
- Ren Zhong as Zhang Qian
- Jin Ming as Yuan Gusheng
- Cong Lin as Gongsun He
- Zhang Shan as Guo Jie
- Li Ping as Liu She
- Huang Wei as Huang Sheng
- Yang Jun as Xiongnu general
- Fu Xuan as Sang Hongyang
- Qin Fan as Zhi Buyi
- Liu Dianxin as Cheng Bushi
- Guo Xirui as Zhuang Qingdi
- Ren Wu as Wang Zang
- Cui Yugui as Gongsun Hong
- Daliehan as Right Xiongnu Prince
- Xiaobate as Left Xiongnu Prince
- Xue Xiaolong as Zhao Wan
- Zhang Jingdong as Liu Qian
- Fu Li as Princess Consort
- Yang Dawei as Dongfang Shuo
- Huang Wei as Yang Deyi
- Wan Cang as Chen Yuanliang / Ying Gao
- Shi Zhishan as Feng Lin
- Li Xiaoding as Luo Yushan
- Zhang Hongbin as Zhang Tang
- Zhu Weican as Wang Fei
- Zhang Jialiang as Zheng Dangshi
- Gao Tingting as Li Yan
- Erentuya as Zhang Qian's wife
- Jia Wei as Su Jian
- Hao Hanfeng as Zhang Cigong
- Chen Yu'er as Liu Qian's wife
- Ba Yin as Gunchen Chanyu
- Bilige as King of Baiyang
- Xiaobate as Marquis of Guishuangxi
- Hui Jianguo as Liu Pengzu (Prince of Zhao)
- Nuqian as Yimei
- Hasibate as King of Xiutu
- Zhang Chaoli as Sang Hongyang
- Zhang Lei as Huo Guang / Lei Bei
  - Fan Binbin as young Huo Guang
- Xu Chong as Jin Midi
  - Sun Xun as young Jin Midi
- Ren Wei as Liu Ju
  - Gu Guangpeng as young Liu Ju
- Wang Yingqi as Li Guangli / Sima Wangcheng
- Shen Baoping as Liu Qumao
- Liang Wei as Su Wu
- Qi Jie as Yu Chang
- Ba Yin as Hu Yafu
- Qin Jiahua as Tian Qianqiu
- Xia Zhixiang as Zhang Ou
- Huang Wenguang as Tao Qing
- Sun Zhanxian as Feng Jing
- Xu Dengke as Zhou Gongzi
- Chen Dazhong as Dou Pengzu
- Lin Zhonghua as Xu Chang
- He Ming as Zhou's wife
- Yang Pingyou as Yan Zhu
- Liu Wei as Dong Zhongshu
- Chen Zhigang as Yu Dan
- Cheng Wenxuan as Princess Linlü
- Balazhu'er as Xiongnu sorcerer
- Huoercha as Right Xiongnu Prince
- Jin Song as Left Grand Viceroy
- Jia Mingling as Ning Cheng
- Lou Jicheng as Liu An
- Zhong Hanhao as Shen Gong
- Zhang Xuehao as Gongsun Ao
- Hou Xiangling as Zhu Fuyan / Di Shan
- Jiang Guoyin as Wang Hui
- Gao Fei as Gan Fu
- Xie Hui as Nie Yi, Su Wen
- Song Jianhua as Li Xi
- Jiang Jing as Dou's wife
- Wang Guangjun as Li Yannian
- Dong Yunbo as Zhang Qian's son
- Liu Zhenbao as Li Gan
- Sengge Renqin as King of Loufan
- Guo Wei as Li Ling / Xihou Jia
- Wang Weimin as Xihou Wu / Du Zhou
- Gu Weiwei as Tian Fen's wife
- Li Jiang as Wu Bei
- Xue Xilong as Liu Qi
- Liu Changshan as Chancellor of Dayuan
- Bo Lin as Zhao Ponu
- He Qi as King of Hunxie
- Zhao Wanyi as Lady Zhao
- Hao Gang as Jiang Chong / Liu De
- Na Zhidong as Zhang Sheng
- Sun Xinyu as Liu Fuling

== Production and reception ==
The production cost for The Emperor in Han Dynasty ran high, with a budget of 50 million yuan, covering extensive battle scenes, period costumes, props and huge backdrops. The crew chose various scenic locations in China, such as Inner Mongolia, Hebei, Henan and Zhejiang, to capture the vast expanse of the Han Empire and its frontiers, The palace of Emperor Wu of Han was filmed at Jiaozuo Film and Television City.

. The casting featured four different actors playing Emperor Wu at different stages of his life, with the lead actor Chen Baoguo receiving the most screen time portraying the emperor's adult years. The shooting of the series began in 2003 and coincided with the SARS outbreak, causing manpower shortage and delays in production. Post-production began in 2004 and marketing clips started to appear on television talk shows and the Internet later that year.

The series was aired on CCTV-1 on 2 January 2005 to great enthusiasm from audience. While some liberties were taken with historical details, The Emperor in Han Dynasty was generally well received by viewers as a faithful portrayal of history. The series was acclaimed and won the 2005 Flying Apsaras Award for Best Long Television Series, Best Director (Hu Mei) and Best Lead Actor (Chen Baoguo).

== List of featured songs ==
- Zuihou De Qingsu (最后的倾诉; The Final Outpour), the opening theme song, performed by Han Lei.
- Dengdai (等待; Wait), the ending theme song, performed by Han Lei.
- Xinling Shui Guo De Difang (心灵睡过的地方; Places Where My Soul Rested Before) performed by Han Lei
- Qianbai Nian Hou Shei Hai Jide Shei (千百年后谁还记得谁; Centuries and Millenniums Later Who Still Remembers Who) performed by Han Lei
