= Empress Dowager Bo =

Empress dowager of Han Dynasty of China

Consort Bo
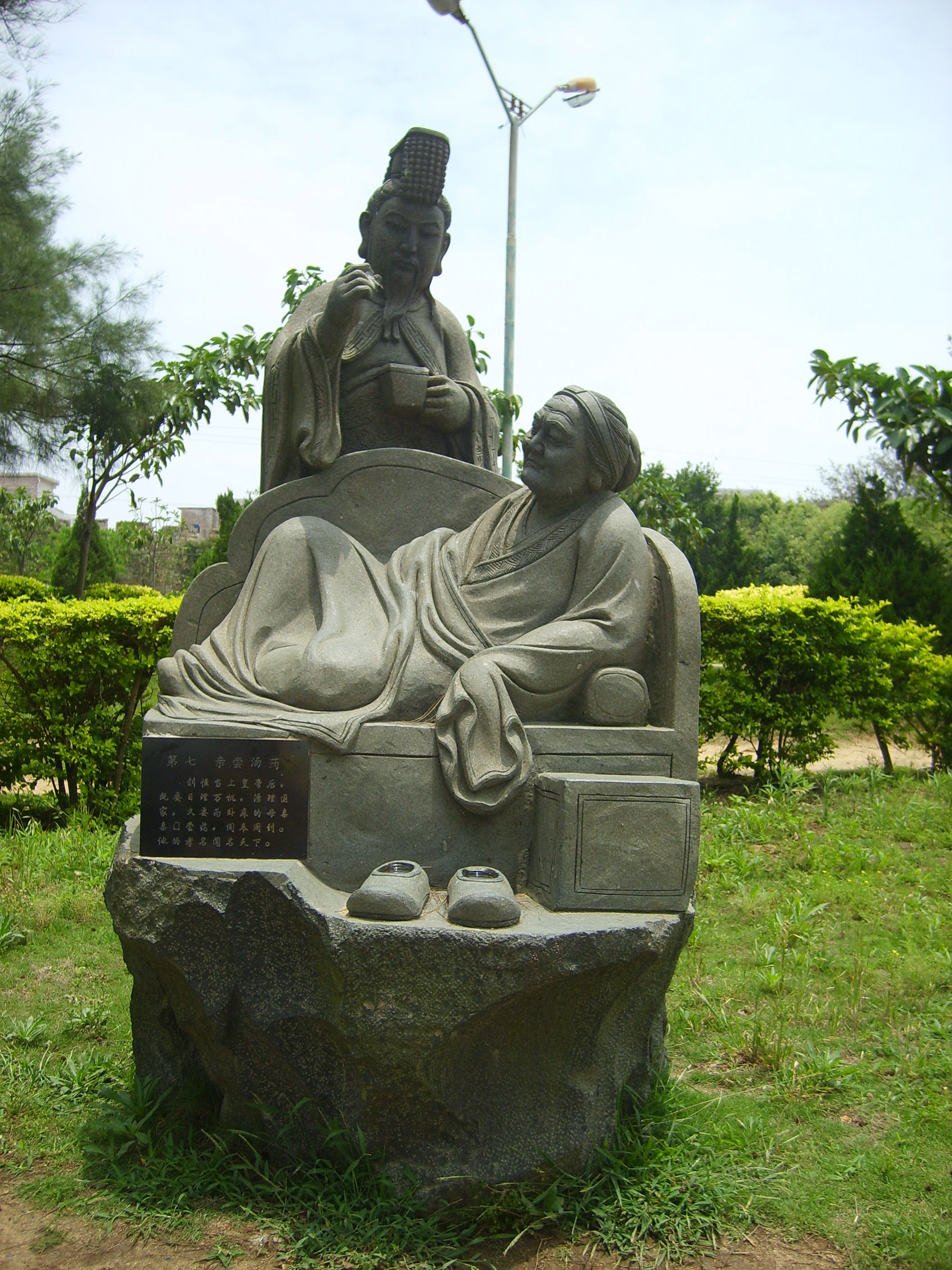
- Statue of Consort Bo (front), part of a series of statues depicting The Twenty-four Filial Exemplars

Empress dowager of China
- Tenure: 180–157 BC
- Predecessor: Empress Dowager Lü
- Successor: Empress Dowager Dou

Grand empress dowager of China
- Tenure: 157 – 9 June 155 BC
- Predecessor: None
- Successor: Empress Dou
- Died: 9 June 155 BC
- Spouse: Wei Bao, Prince of Western Wei; Emperor Gaozu of Han
- Issue: Emperor Wen of Han
Posthumous name
- Empress Gao 高皇后
- Father: Lord Bo, Marquess of Linwen
- Mother: Lady Wei, Marchioness of Linwen

Empress Dowager Bo (Chinese: 薄太后), personal name lost to history, was an imperial concubine of Emperor Gaozu of Han (Liu Bang). She was also known as Consort Bo (薄姬) during the life of the Emperor, and more formally as either Empress Dowager Xiaowen (孝文太后) or (rarer) Empress Gao (高皇后). Despite being a concubine of lower standing, her son, Liu Heng, became Emperor Wen of Han, cementing her place in history. The year of her birth is not known. She died on 9 June 155 BC.

Empress Dowager Bo is formally the first grand empress dowager in Chinese history, as Empress Dowager Lü, the only other empress dowager till then who lived to see her grandson become emperor, never claimed the title.

== Early years ==
The future Empress Dowager Bo's father, Gentleman Bo (薄翁), came from Wu County (吳縣, in modern Suzhou, Jiangsu). He had an adulterous affair with a Lady Wei (魏媼), the daughter of a member of the Wei royal family. Empress Dowager Bo was born of this union.

According to Chinese historical works (with the exception the Book of Han, which tells a different version of her life), Lady Bo was, when she was young, the prettiest concubine of Wei Bao, the Prince of Wei. Wei Bao allied himself with Liu Bang to defeat Xiang Yu's force, but later betrayed Liu Bang by defecting to Xiang Yu's camp. Unlike other defectors who switched sides again after Liu Bang's final victory, Wei Bao remained loyal to Xiang Yu to the end. After Han Xin conquered Wei, Wei Bao and his entire family were brought in front of Liu Bang to await execution. Wei Bao begged for mercy, but the emperor was unreceptive until he offered Lady Bo as a gift to Liu Bang. Her beauty had captured the attention of the emperor, and she was taken as an imperial concubine. Her former husband was thus spared execution. Historical records did not provide the information on whether other members of Wei Bao's family were spared as well, but it was likely the case.

Lady Bo was not favored among the concubines, but she gave birth to a son, Liu Heng, who was made the Prince of Dai. The birth of her son elevated Lady Bo's status to Consort Bo. Unlike many other concubines, she was not confined to the palace and was allowed to accompany her son to the remote Principality of Dai (modern northern Shanxi and northwestern Hebei) to be the princess dowager. Dai was not a rich domain, and the region was under constant threats and attacks from the Xiongnu. Although Consort Bo could not live a luxurious lifestyle so far from the imperial palaces, she still managed to have a relatively comfortable life. Nonetheless, she had to work as a seamstress. Such rather difficult living conditions in comparison to other consorts had an unexpected benefit: unlike other consorts who became Empress Lü Zhi's victims due to her jealousy, Lü was very sympathetic to Consort Bo. The empress never saw Bo and her son as a threat to her quest of power, and thus, the two were spared from the politics that killed many other concubines and princes.

The Book of Han tells a different story of how Lady Bo came to become the emperor's concubine. It states that Liu Bang discovered Lady Bo working as a seamstress in Dai and took her as his concubine there. Despite this difference in Lady Bo's origin, the Book of Han and other historical texts converge with Lady Bo and her son, Liu Heng, in the Principality of Dai.

== Rise to the top ==
In August 180 BC, after the death of her mistress, Emperor Gao's wife Empress Lü, and after the officials then slaughtered the Lü clan, they offered the throne to Prince Heng over his nephew Emperor Houshao—whom they accused of not being imperial blood. Prince Heng consulted Princess Dowager Bo, who could not decide either. It was later, after they dispatched Princess Dowager Bo's brother Bo Zhao (薄昭) to the capital Chang'an to observe the situation and to ascertain the officials' good faith that Prince Heng chose to accept the throne.

== Later years ==
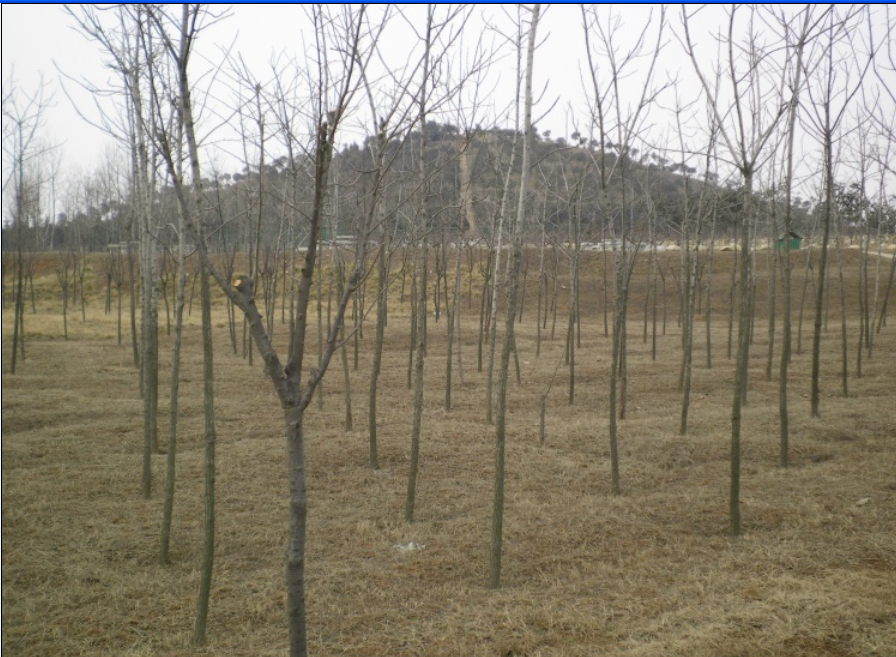
The tomb of Empress Dowager Bo in Xi'an, Shaanxi

After Prince Heng took the throne as Emperor Wen, Princess Dowager Bo was honored as empress dowager, even though she had not previously been an empress. She was largely unassuming as empress dowager, and did not exert anywhere close to the influence that Empress Dowager Lü asserted over Emperor Hui or even her daughter-in-law, Empress Dou, would later assert over her grandson Emperor Jing. The one major instance in which she asserted her influence was in 176 BC. At that time, Zhou Bo, who had been instrumental in Emperor Wen's becoming emperor, had retired to his march when he was falsely accused of treason and arrested. Empress Dowager Bo, believing in Zhou's innocence, famously threw her scarf at Emperor Wen, stating:

Before you became emperor, Zhou was in control of the imperial seal, and commanded the powerful northern guards. How ridiculous is it that he did not commit treason then, but now plans to use his small march as the base for a rebellion?

It was at least partly due to her influence that Emperor Wen eventually released Zhou.

She either did not try to intercede similarly (as appears most likely) or was ineffective in her intercession, when her brother Bo Zhao killed an imperial messenger—a crime far more serious than ordinary murder—in 170 BC. Even though Bo Zhao was the Empress Dowager's only sibling, Emperor Wen eventually pressed him into committing suicide.

One of the final influences Empress Dowager Bo had was when she arranged for the daughter of one of her relatives to marry her grandson, then-Crown Prince Qi, during her son's reign. After Emperor Wen died in 157 BC and Crown Prince Qi succeeded him as Emperor Jing, Empress Dowager Bo became grand empress dowager. There was no recorded instance of her trying to assert political influence after that. She died just two years later in June 155 BC. (This would prove disastrous for Emperor Jing's wife, Empress Bo, as she would be soon deposed after losing her main support.)

After she died, she was enshrined in a temple of her own rather than in her husband's temple, because only one empress could be enshrined in an emperor's temple, and Empress Lü was already enshrined in Emperor Gao's temple. Later, during Emperor Guangwu's reign, however, he effectively reversed the position of Empress Dowager Bo and Empress Lü by enshrining Empress Dowager Bo as "Empress Gao" and demoting Empress Dowager Lü to a separate temple.
