= Jin Su =

Jin Su (金俗; fl. 150s – 140s BCE), also known as Lady of Xiucheng (修成君), was a Chinese noble woman during the Han dynasty. She was a half-sister of Emperor Wu. Jin Su was the long-lost daughter of Empress Wang Zhi and her first husband, Jin Wangsun.

== Background ==
Jin Su was the daughter of Wang Zhi and Jin Wangsun. Wang Zhi was a daughter of Zang Er, who was a granddaughter of Zang Tu, the one-time King of Yan appointed by Xiang Yu until the fifth year of Emperor Gaozu. Zang Tu rebelled against the Emperor and was defeated. He and his entire family was massacred. Lady Jin did not follow Wang Zhi when she joined Crown Prince Liu Qi's harem. Lady Wang was pregnant with her eldest son Liu Che when Liu Qi ascended the throne as Emperor Jing of Han, after Emperor Wen's death in July 157 BC.

== As Lady of Xiucheng ==
After Liu Che ascended to the throne as Emperor Wu in March 141 BC, he found out from his mother that he had a half-sister. Jin Su was tracked down and personally visited by Emperor Wu, and he created her the Lady of Xiucheng (修成君), an honorable title. She was awarded 300 servants, 100 acres of land, and a grand mansion. She even had the right to freely enter and leave the palace and meet the royal family, and sat at the table with the emperor and empress dowager. She was also granted the title of County Jun (xianjun). Jin Su's daughter E (娥) was married Liu Qian, the heir of Prince of Huainan Liu An (刘安).
