= Zhou Bo =

Chinese Han dynasty military general and politician

- 周勃

Right Imperial Chancellor 右丞相
- In office 16 December 180 (Note: This date corresponds to the xinsi day of the 11th month of the first year of Emperor Wen's reign, per Volume 13 of the Zizhi Tongjian. This was the same day Chen Ping became Left Imperial Chancellor. In the modified Zhuanxu calendar used in this era, the first year of Emperor Wen's reign began on 15 November 180 BC and ended on 4 November 179 BC in the proleptic Julian calendar.) – 2 October 179 BC (Note: This corresponds to the xinwei day of the eighth month of the first year of Emperor Wen's reign, per Volume 13 of the Zizhi Tongjian. Chen Ping took over the post of Right Imperial Chancellor on the same day.)
- Monarch: Emperor Wen of Han
- Preceded by: Chen Ping

Personal details
- Born: Unknown; Pei County, Jiangsu
- Died: c.169 BC
- Children: Zhou Shengzhi; Zhou Yafu; Zhou Jian
- Occupation: Politician
- Posthumous name: Marquis Wu 武侯
- Peerage: Marquis of Jiang 絳侯

Zhou Bo (周勃; died c.169 BC), posthumously known as Marquis Wu of Jiang (绛武侯), was a Chinese official who served as a chancellor of the early Han dynasty. A friend of the Han dynasty's founding emperor Liu Bang (Emperor Gaozu), he joined Liu in the rebellion against the Qin dynasty between 209 and 206 BC, and later fought on Liu's side against Liu's rival Xiang Yu during the Chu–Han Contention from 206 BC to 202 BC. After the Han dynasty was established, he held key appointments in the government, including Grand Commandant and Right Imperial Chancellor, until his death.

== Life ==
Zhou Bo's ancestral home was in Juan County (卷縣; present-day Yuanyang County, Henan) but he was born in Pei County in present-day Jiangsu. A friend of Liu Bang, he joined the latter in the rebellion against the Qin dynasty between 209 and 206 BC. After the fall of the Qin dynasty in 206 BC, Zhou Bo fought on Liu Bang's side against his rival Xiang Yu in a power struggle for supremacy over China historically known as the Chu–Han Contention (206–202 BC).

After Liu Bang defeated Xiang Yu, became emperor and established the Han dynasty in 202 BC, he enfeoffed Zhou Bo as the Marquis of Jiang (絳侯) to honour him for his contributions. When Liu Bang died in 195 BC, his empress Lü Zhi and her clan seized power; her son Liu Ying was under the Lüs' control as a puppet ruler. During this time, Zhou Bo served as Grand Commandant (太尉).

After the Lüs were ousted from power and another of Liu Bang's sons, Liu Heng (Emperor Wen), became emperor, Zhou Bo started serving as Right Imperial Chancellor on 16 December 180 BC. However, he resigned within a year as he realised that he was not competent enough for the role. Chen Ping, the Left Imperial Chancellor, then took over Zhou Bo's office and held both, but died shortly after in November 179 BC. On 5 December 179 BC, (Note: This corresponds to the yihai day of the 11th month of the second year of Emperor Wen's reign, per Volume 13 of the Zizhi Tongjian. In the modified Zhuanxu calendar used during this era, the second year of Emperor Wen's reign started on 5 November 179 BC and ended on 23 November 178 BC in the proleptic Julian calendar.) Zhou Bo took office as Imperial Chancellor again to replace Chen Ping, and was relieved of his duties in the week of 22 January 177 BC, (Note: Volume 14 of the Zizhi Tongjian indicated that Zhou Bo was dismissed as Chancellor in the 12th month of the third year of Emperor Wen's reign. The month started on 22 January 177 BC in the proleptic Julian calendar. However, since Guan Ying was appointed Chancellor on 29 January (the yihai day of that month), Zhou Bo's dismissal must have taken place between 22 and 29 January. In the modified Zhuanxu calendar used during this era, the third year of Emperor Wen's reign started on 24 November 178 BC and ended on 11 November 177 BC in the proleptic Julian calendar.) after which he retired and returned to his marquisate. Guan Ying took over his role on 29 January 177 BC.

When Zhou Bo died in 169 BC, Emperor Wen awarded him the posthumous title "Marquis Wu" (武侯; 'military marquis') to honour him for his contributions to the Han dynasty.

One of Zhou Bo's sons, Zhou Yafu, served under Liu Qi (Emperor Jing), Emperor Wen's successor, and played a key role in suppressing the Rebellion of the Seven States in 154 BC.
