= Zhou Yafu =

Han dynasty general (died c.143 BCE)

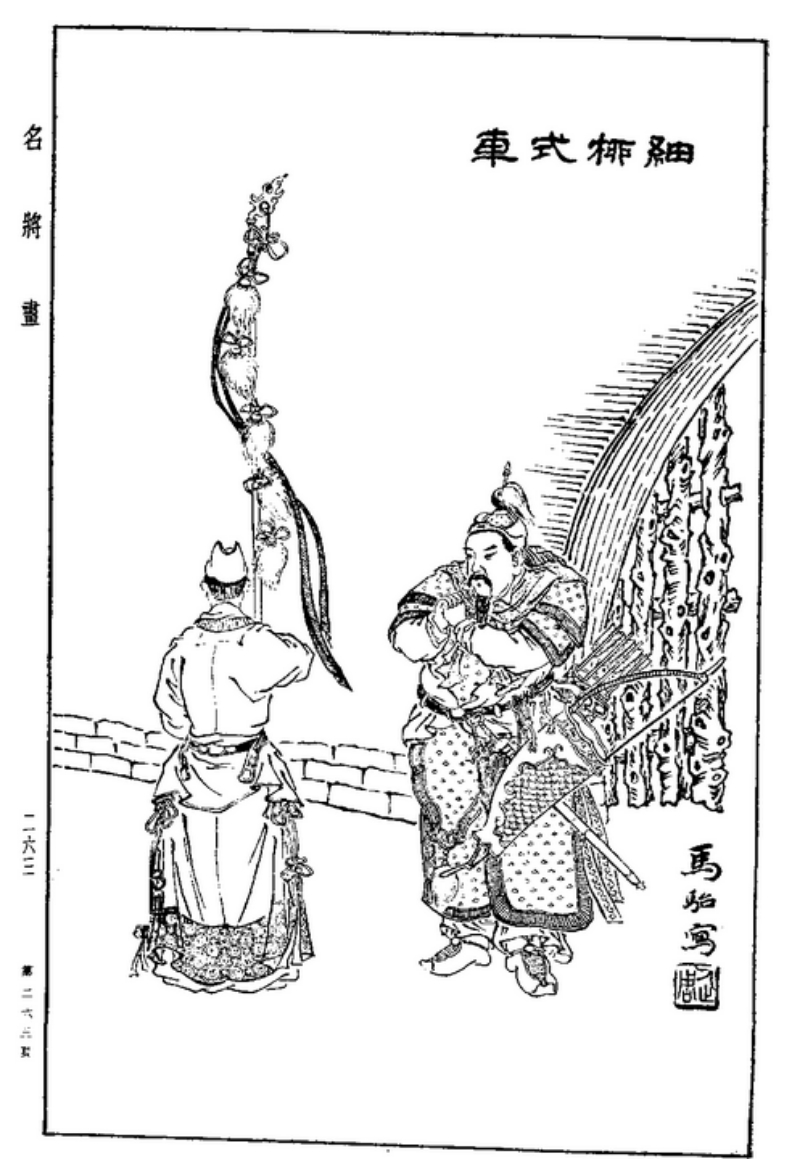
Zhou Yafu

Zhou Yafu (simplified Chinese: 周亚夫; traditional Chinese: 周亞夫; pinyin: Zhōu Yàfū) (died c.143 BC) was a Chinese military general and politician of the Western Han dynasty. He is known for putting down the Rebellion of the Seven States, but was later arrested and imprisoned by Emperor Jing for treason. Zhou Yafu committed suicide by starving himself in prison.

== Early career ==
Zhou's father, Zhou Bo, was one of Liu Bang's generals during the Chu-Han Contention and participated in the ascension to the throne by Emperor Jing's father Emperor Wen. Zhou Bo was created the Marquess of Jiang. After Zhou Bo died in 169 BC, his son and Zhou Yafu's older brother Zhou Shengzhi (周勝之) inherited the march, but after one year he was accused of murder and executed. In his stead, Zhou Yafu was created a marquess, but of a different march (Tiao). Later Zhou was made the governor of the Commandery of Taiyuan (around modern Taiyuan, Shanxi).

In 158 BC, when Xiongnu made a major incursion into the Commanderies of Shang (modern northern Shaanxi) and Yunzhong (modern western Inner Mongolia), Emperor Wen made a visit to the camps of armies preparing to defend the capital Chang'an against a potential Xiongnu attack. It was on this occasion that he became impressed with Zhou as a military commander—compared to the other generals, who, upon the emperor's arrival, stopped what they were doing and did what they could to make the emperor feel welcome. In contrast, Zhou remained on military alert and required the imperial guards to submit to proper military order before he would allow the imperial train to enter. Later, Emperor Wen would leave instructions for Crown Prince Liu Qi that if military emergencies arose, he should make Zhou his commander of armed forces.

== During the Rebellion of the Seven States ==
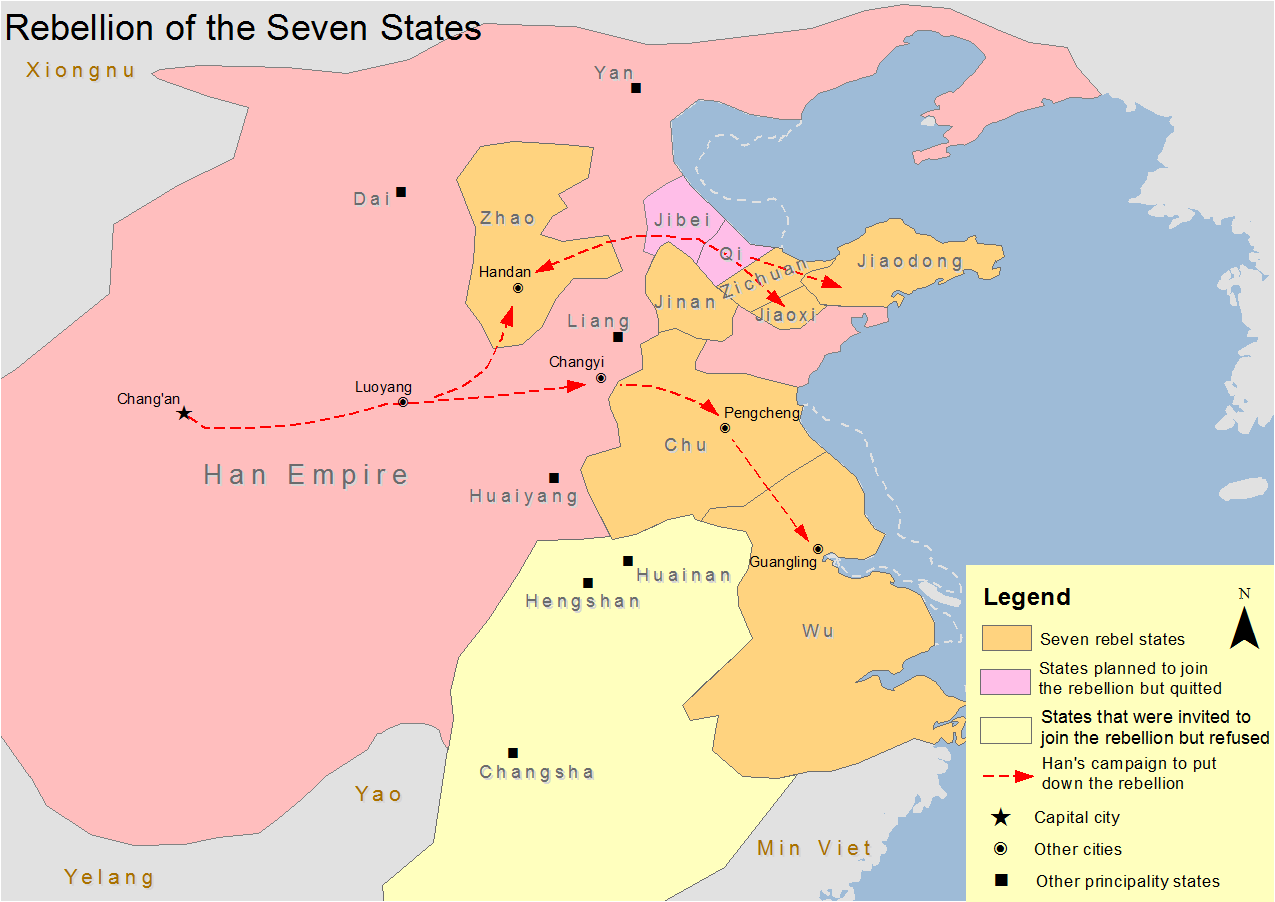
Map showing Zhou Yafu's military campaign against the seven states

After Crown Prince Qi became emperor (as Emperor Jing) in 157 BC, a military emergency did arise. Concerned that the princes of collateral lines of the imperial clan were becoming overly powerful, Emperor Jing, based on the advice of Chao Cuo, attempted to reduce the size of the principalities. Seven principalities, led by the powerful principalities of Wu (modern southern Jiangsu, northern Zhejiang, southern Anhui, and northern Jiangxi) and Chu (modern northern Jiangsu and northern Anhui) rebelled in a war later known as the Rebellion of the Seven States.

In accordance with Emperor Wen's instructions, Emperor Jing made Zhou the commander of the armed forces. At that time, the Wu and Chu forces were fiercely attacking the Principality of Liang (modern eastern Henan), whose prince Liu Wu was Emperor Jing's younger brother.

Emperor Jing ordered Zhou to immediately head to Liang to save the principality. Zhou refused to specifically follow that instruction, reasoning that the proper strategy would involve first cutting off the Wu and Chu supply lines, thus starving them. So he headed to the north-east of Liang and around the Wu and Chu forces to cut off their supplies.

The strategy was effective. Wu and Chu, unable to capture Liang quickly and realizing that their supplies were dwindling, headed north-east to attack Zhou. After being unable to get a decisive victory against Zhou, the Wu and Chu forces collapsed from starvation. Liu Pi fled to Donghai, but the citizens killed him and sought peace with Han. Liu Wu, the prince of Chu, committed suicide. The other principalities involved were all eventually defeated.

Zhou's effective strategy was praised and admired by the other generals, but not by the wealthy Prince Wu or his powerful mother, the empress dowager Dou, who would bear a grudge against Zhou for the rest of their lives because of Zhou's refusal to save him first.

== Post-Rebellion career ==
In the aftermath of the war, Zhou was made prime minister and was well-trusted by Emperor Jing. After Zhou unsuccessfully tried to persuade Emperor Jing not to depose his crown prince Liu Rong in 150 BC, however, Zhou lost the favour of the emperor. Prince Wu and Empress Dowager Dou, still bearing grudges, also attacked him incessantly whenever they could.

Emperor Jing's empress Wang Zhi joined their ranks when he stood in the way of a promotion of her brother Wang Xin. The Empress Dowager wanted to create him a marquess for his intercession with the emperor after the Prince of Liang was involved in the assassination of nearly a dozen ministers (including Yuan Ang) as part of a dispute over the imperial succession. Zhou repeatedly rebuffed his candidacy as insufficiently meritorious.

Zhou had a further disagreement over the policy towards Xiongnu defectors. Emperor Jing wanted to bestow them with honours to encourage future Xiongnu defections, while Zhou, who considered them to be traitors, wanted to simply let them live in obscurity. As a result, Emperor Jing removed Zhou as prime minister in 147 BC.

== Death ==
During 143 BC, Zhou was summoned to dinner with the emperor. Knowing that he still had great influence within the military, Zhou arrived late. The emperor then had a large piece of meat placed before Zhou, but no chopsticks were provided to him. Zhou requested chopsticks from the Imperial attendants. Emperor Jing looked at him smiling and said, "Are you not satisfied?" Zhou realised that this was a trap, and immediately apologized and withdrew. After he left, Emperor Jing made the comment, "This complainer is no subject for my son when he becomes emperor!"

Later that year, Zhou's son, in anticipation of his death, purchased old armour and weapons from the imperial armoury to serve as burial decorations. When he refused to pay the delivery workers, they retaliated by accusing Zhou of treason because at the time unauthorised purchases of weapons were treated as treason and punishable by death. Emperor Jing sent investigators to interrogate Zhou, he refused to talk to them. Offended, Emperor Jing had Zhou Yafu arrested and interrogated in prison, and the interrogator, when told by Zhou that the armour and weapons were for burial purposes, accused him of "underground treason"—i.e. he was ready to commit treason against the spirits of the emperors after he died. Zhou, who initially wanted to commit suicide when he was arrested but was persuaded not to by his wife, eventually committed suicide in prison through starvation.

== Legacy ==
Zhou's legacy is mixed. Although he helped put down a rebellion, his personality would eventually lead to his terrible fate, for they caused him to offend powerful individuals that he could not afford to offend, including the emperor himself. His death and life contrasts with the highly regarded reign of Emperor Jing.
