= Empress Bo =

Empress of Han China from 157 to 151 BC

Empress Bo (Chinese: 薄皇后; pinyin: Bò Huánghòu) (personal name unknown) (died 147 BC) was an empress during the Han dynasty. She was the first wife of Emperor Jing, and also the first empress to be deposed in Chinese imperial history.

Empress Bo was from the family of Empress Dowager Bo, who was probably her paternal grandaunt and betrothed her to her grandson, then-Crown Prince Qi during the reign of her son, Emperor Wen. She carried the title of crown princess during the reign of her father-in-law. Then, when her husband became emperor in 157 BC, she was created empress, but she was not favored by her husband, and she had no sons. It was as a consequence of this that Consort Li's son Liu Rong was made crown prince.

After Grand Empress Dowager Bo died in 155 BC, Empress Bo lost her source of support within the palace. In c.October 151 BC, her husband deposed her; she died four years later. She was buried in the Pingwang Pavilion, in the eastern part of Chang'an. Even though she had ties to a person as powerful and influential as Grand Empress Dowager Bo, she never enjoyed a life of much esteem simply because she could not bear a son.

Chinese royalty
Preceded by Empress Dou	Empress of Western Han Dynasty; 157–151 BC	Succeeded by Empress Wang Zhi
