= Yangling Mausoleum of Han =

Western Han imperial mausoleum complex in Shaanxi, China

Coordinates: 34°26′37.67″N 108°56′26.56″E

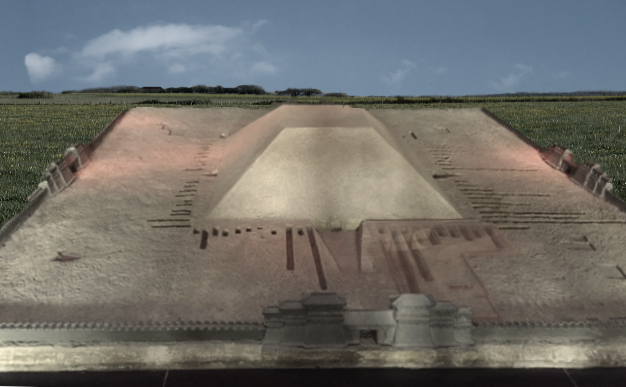
Reconstructed model of how Han Yang Ling looked when it was built

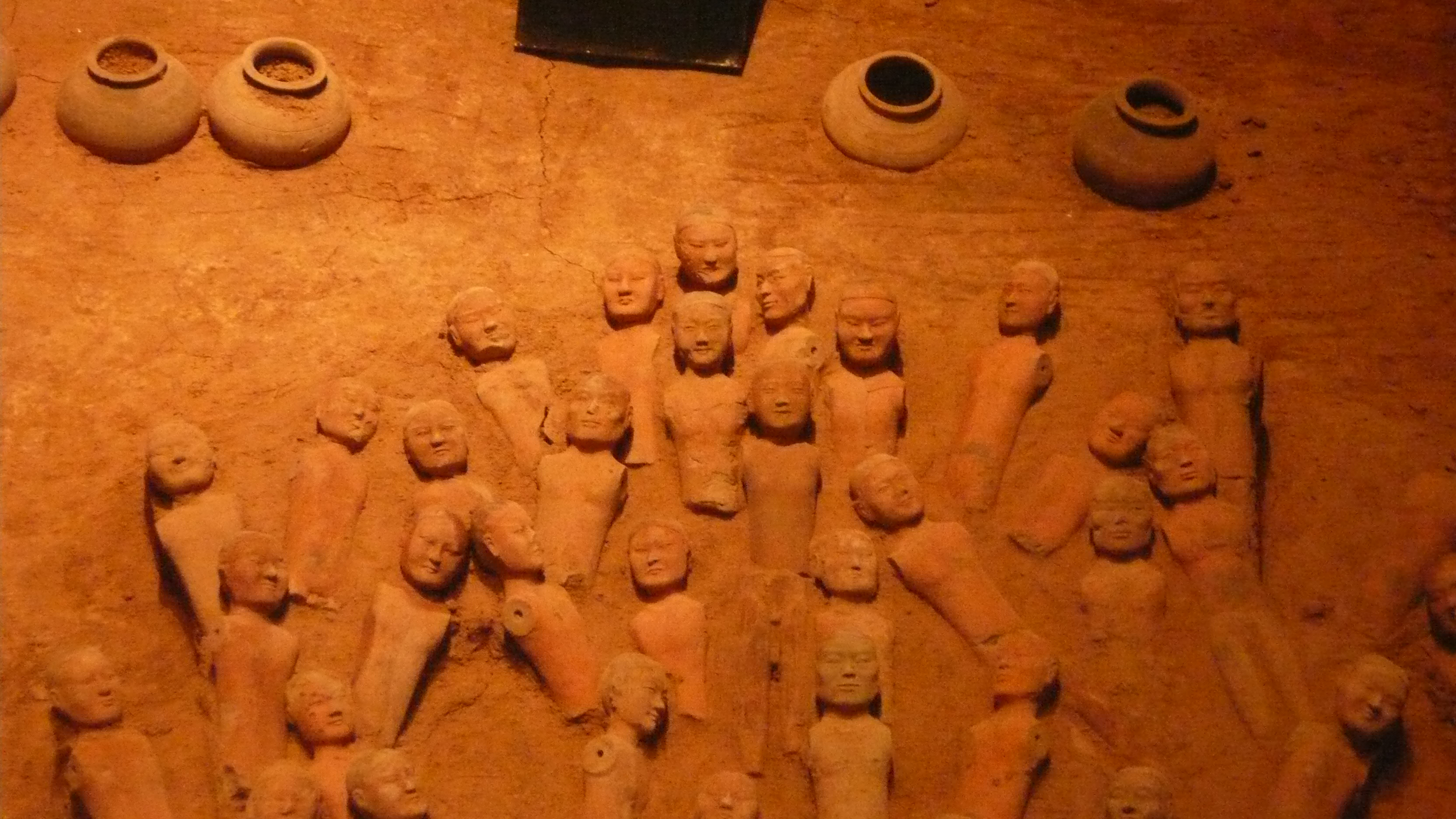
Burial figures in the Han Yang Ling Mausoleum

Exhibit at Han Yang Ling Mausoleum. The figurine in the middle shows how it originally looked at time of burial. The one on the extreme right shows a partially excavated figurine

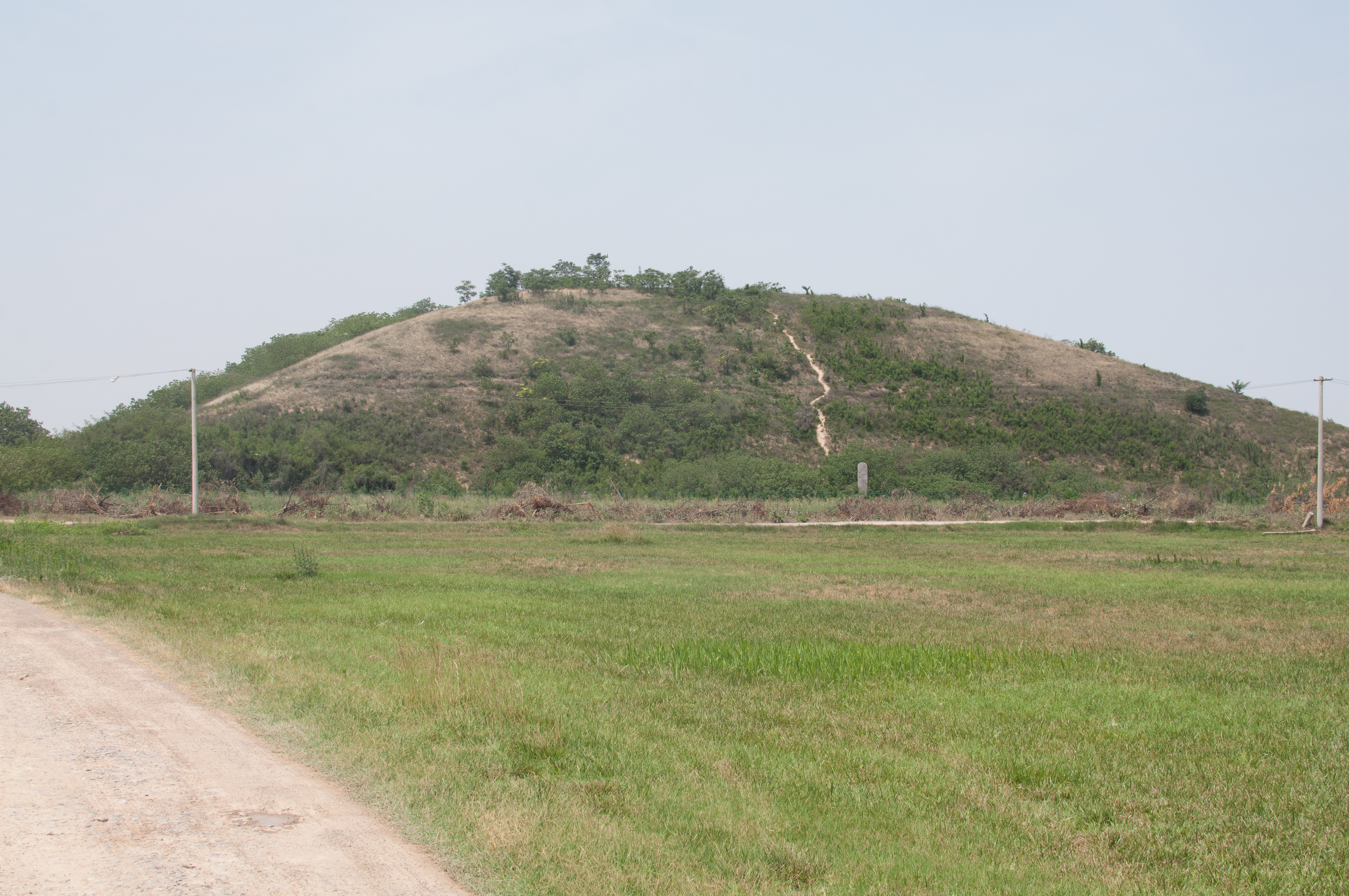
Empress Wang burial mound

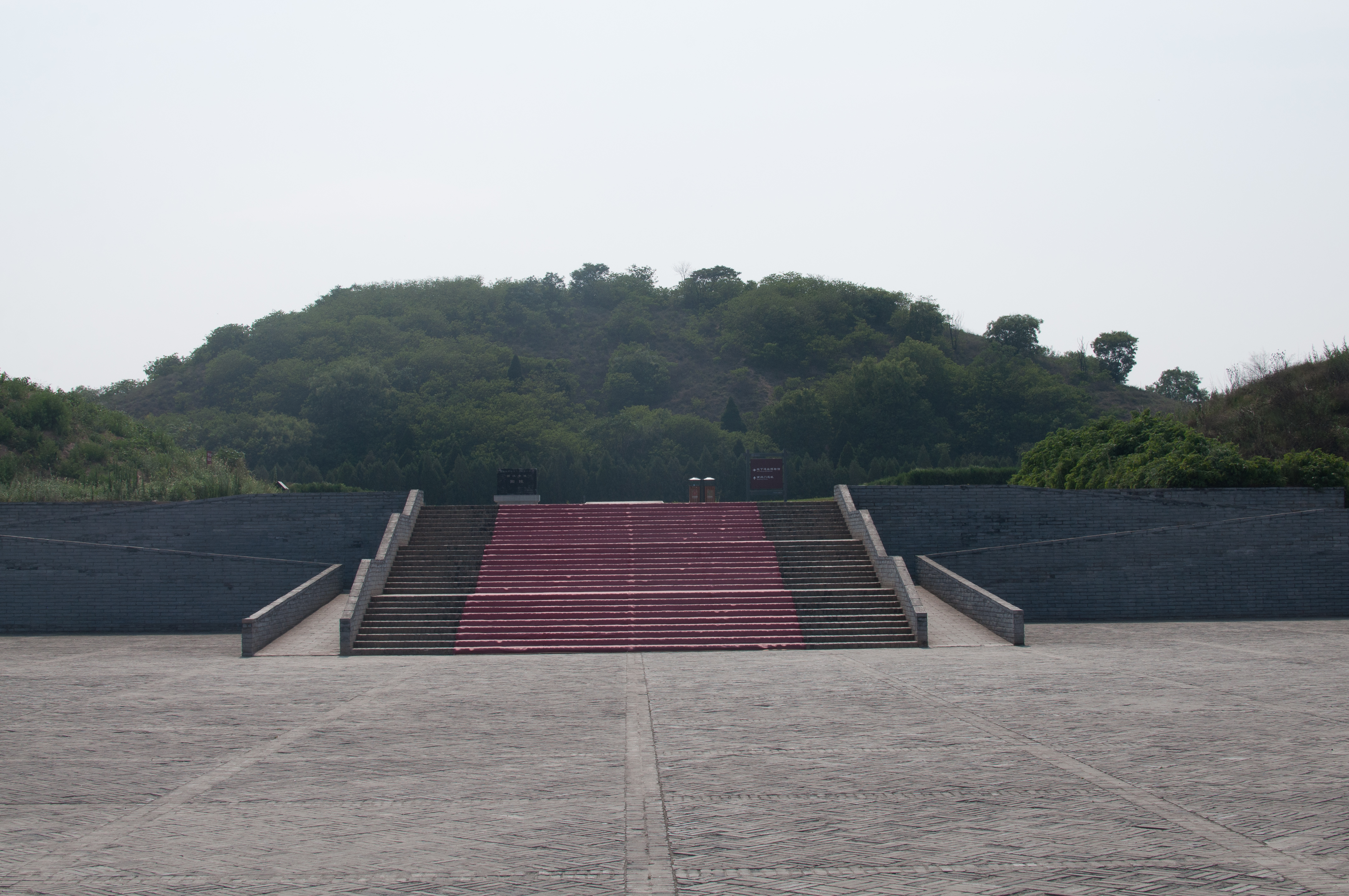
Emperor Jing burial mound

The Yangling Mausoleum of Han (simplified Chinese: 汉阳陵; traditional Chinese: 漢陽陵; pinyin: Hàn Yáng líng) is the mausoleum of Emperor Jing (ruled 157–141 BCE), the sixth emperor of the Western Han dynasty and his Empress Wang. The mausoleum complex is a part of the Western Han dynasty imperial tombs located in the Weicheng district of the City of Xianyang, Shaanxi Province, on the northern bank of the Wei River and about 20 km to the north of the city center of the provincial capital of Xi'an.

== Description ==
The Han Yang Ling is composed of two large burial mounds, 86 smaller burial pits and a criminals' graveyard. The site today also hosts a museum. The larger of the two mounds is the burial place of the Jing Emperor, it sits next to the slightly smaller mound of his Empress Wang. Eighty-one outer burial pits surround the emperor's burial mound; the museum's underground exhibition hall displays ten of them. The pits display more than 50,000 miniature terracotta figures reflecting the daily life of the Han emperor's court, including eunuchs, servants, tools and domesticated animals. The human figurines are naked but were originally clothed with exquisite fabrics that decayed in the space of two millennia.

The complex is one of the "Five Mausoleums" of the Western Han dynasty (Chinese: 西汉五陵; pinyin: Xī Hàn Wǔ Líng). Compared to the early and much more famous Terracotta Army of the first Qin dynasty Emperor Qin Shihuang (210 BCE), the terracotta statues of Yangling are much smaller in size (about 50 centimeters in height), but also much less militaristic, softer in style, and give a bigger weight to daily life.

In 2016, the discovery of the earliest tea traces known to date from the mausoleum of Emperor Jing was announced, indicating that tea was drunk by Han dynasty emperors as early as 2nd century BCE.

== Gallery ==
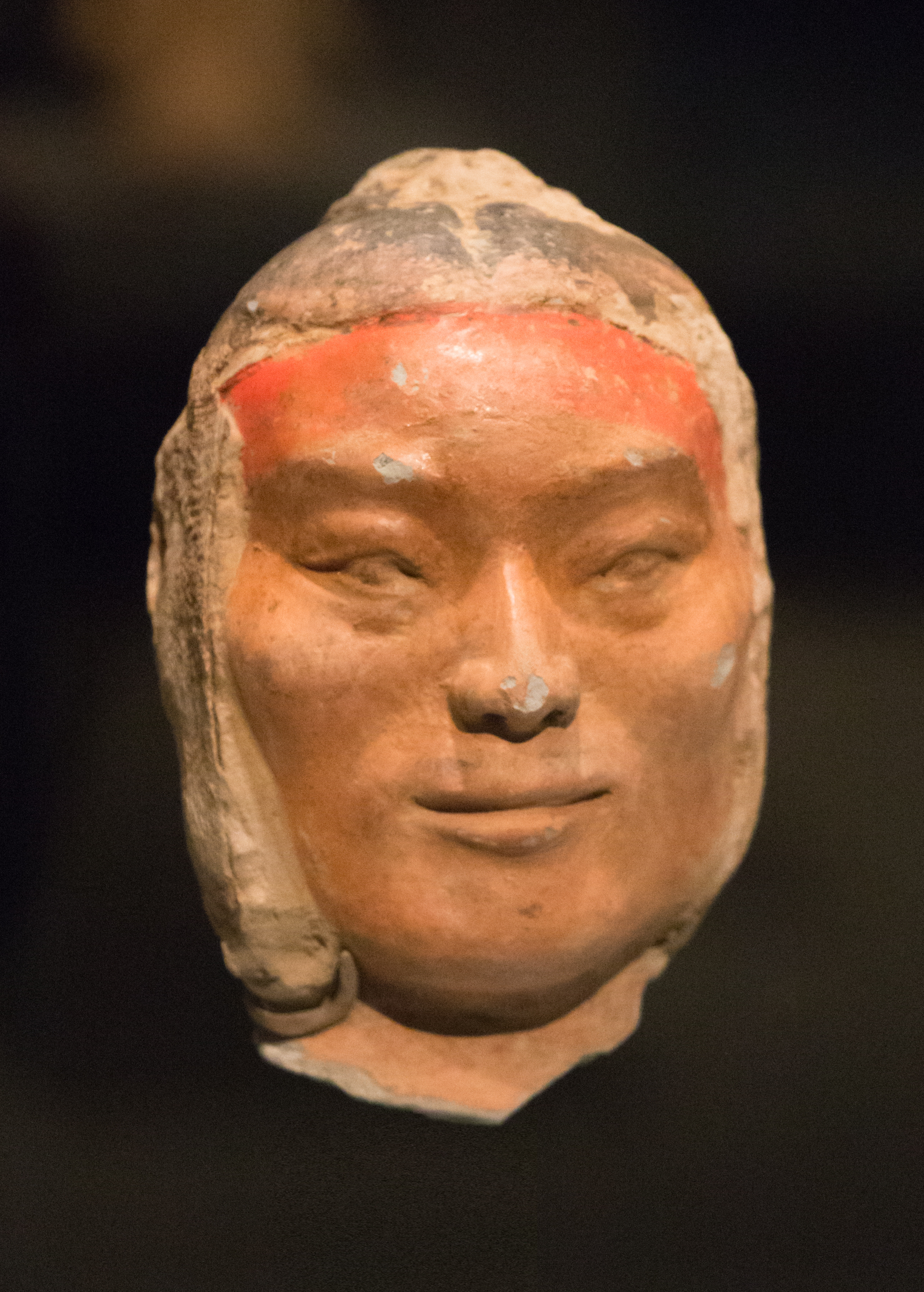
Painted earthenware tomb figurine of a warrior. From the tomb of Emperor Jing (reigned 157–141 BCE). Yangling Mausoleum, Xianyang, Shaanxi, China

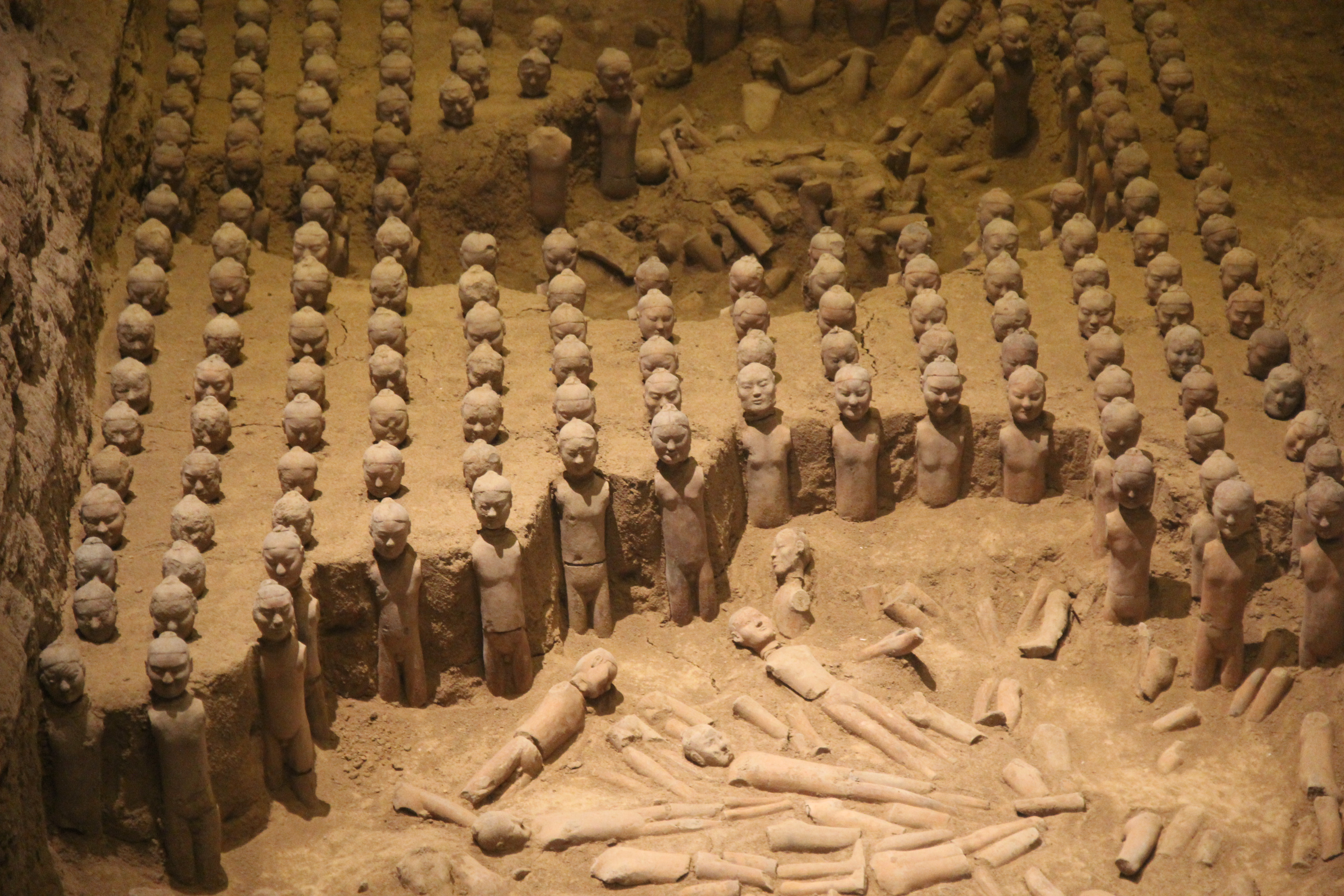
Yangling excavation

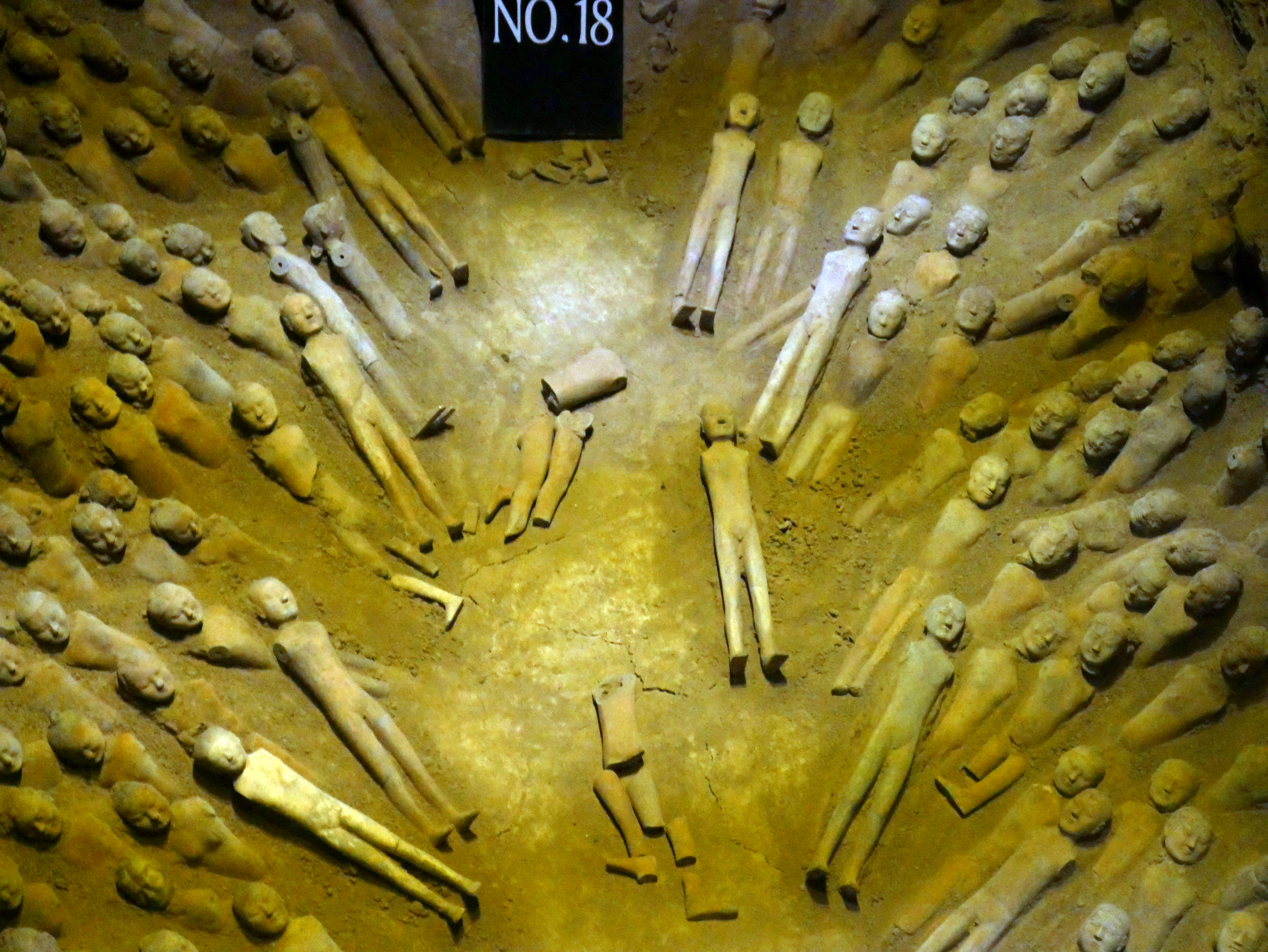
Terracotta figures in an excavated outer burial pit

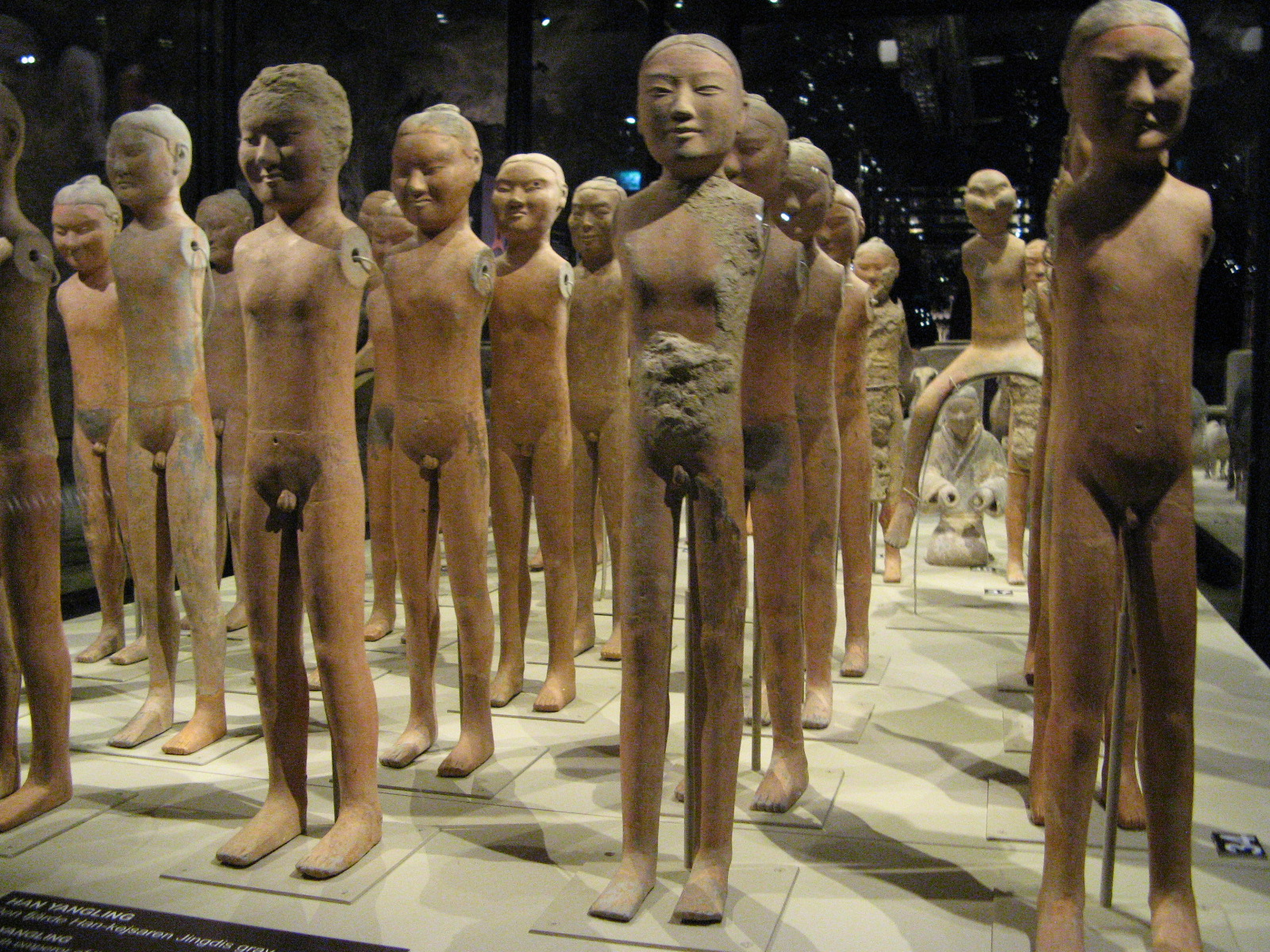
Western Han Terracotta Army of Yangling

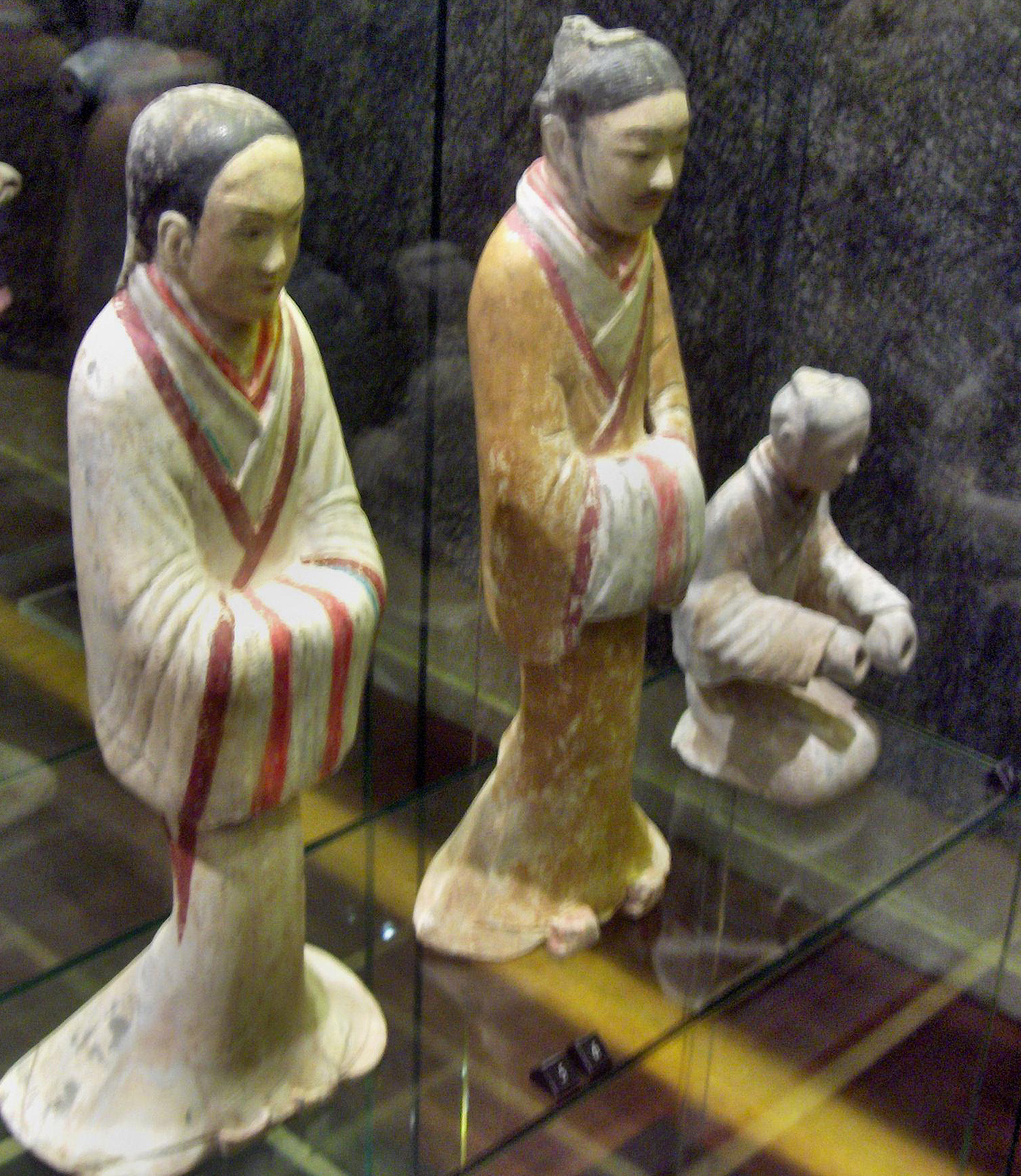
Servant and adviser from lower or middle class, Yangling

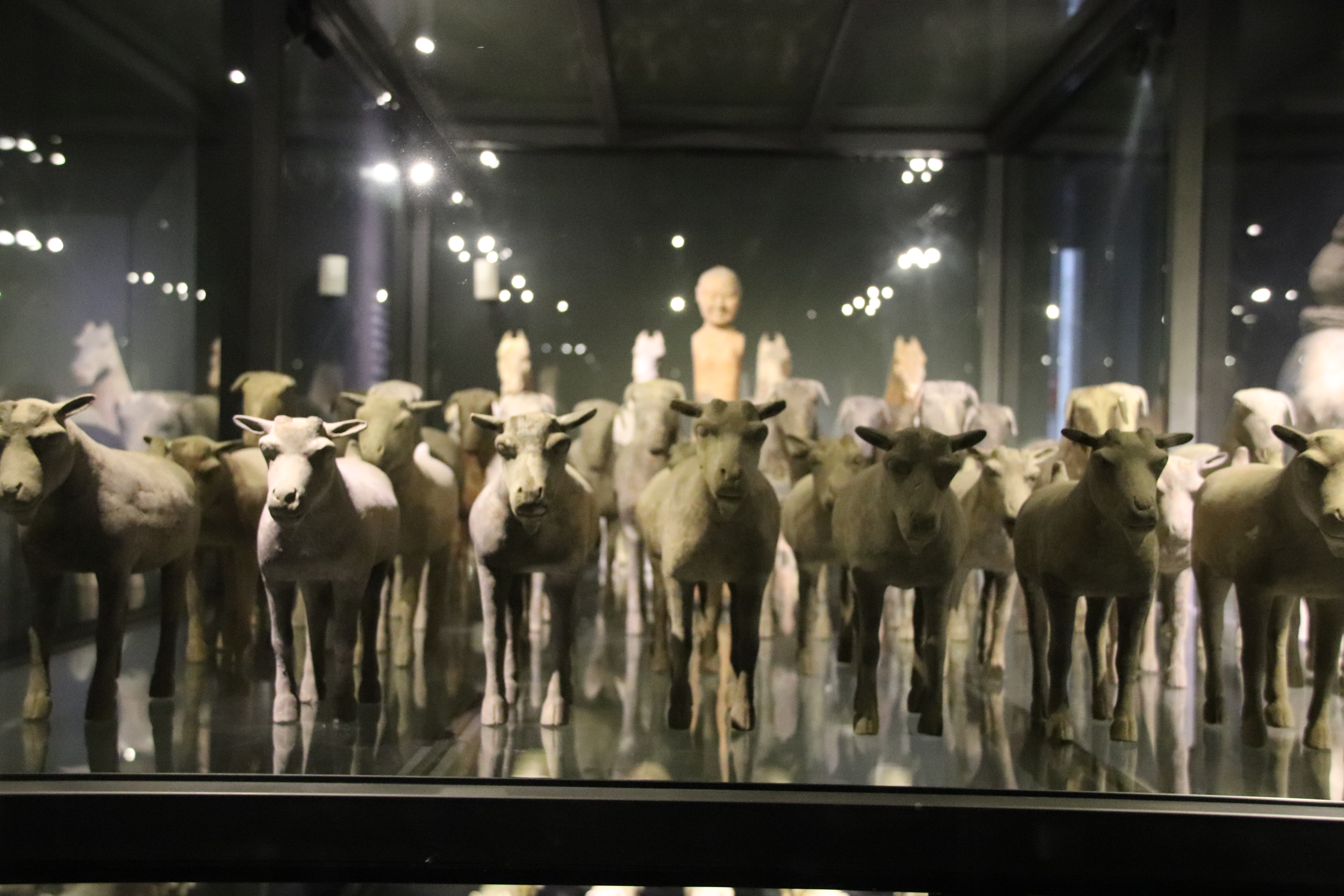
Pottery Animals, Yangling Tomb of Emperor Jing of Western Han

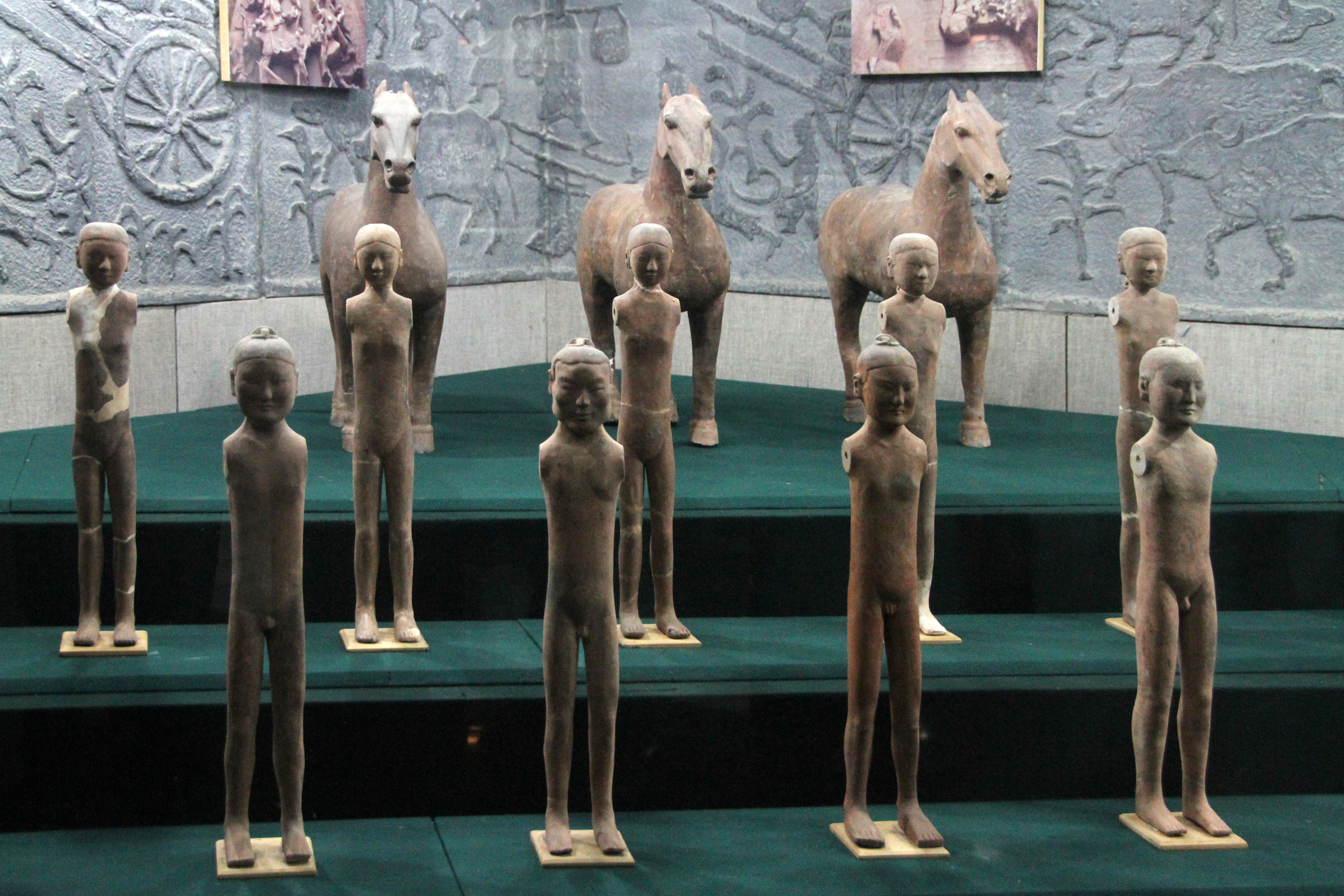
Yangling figurines

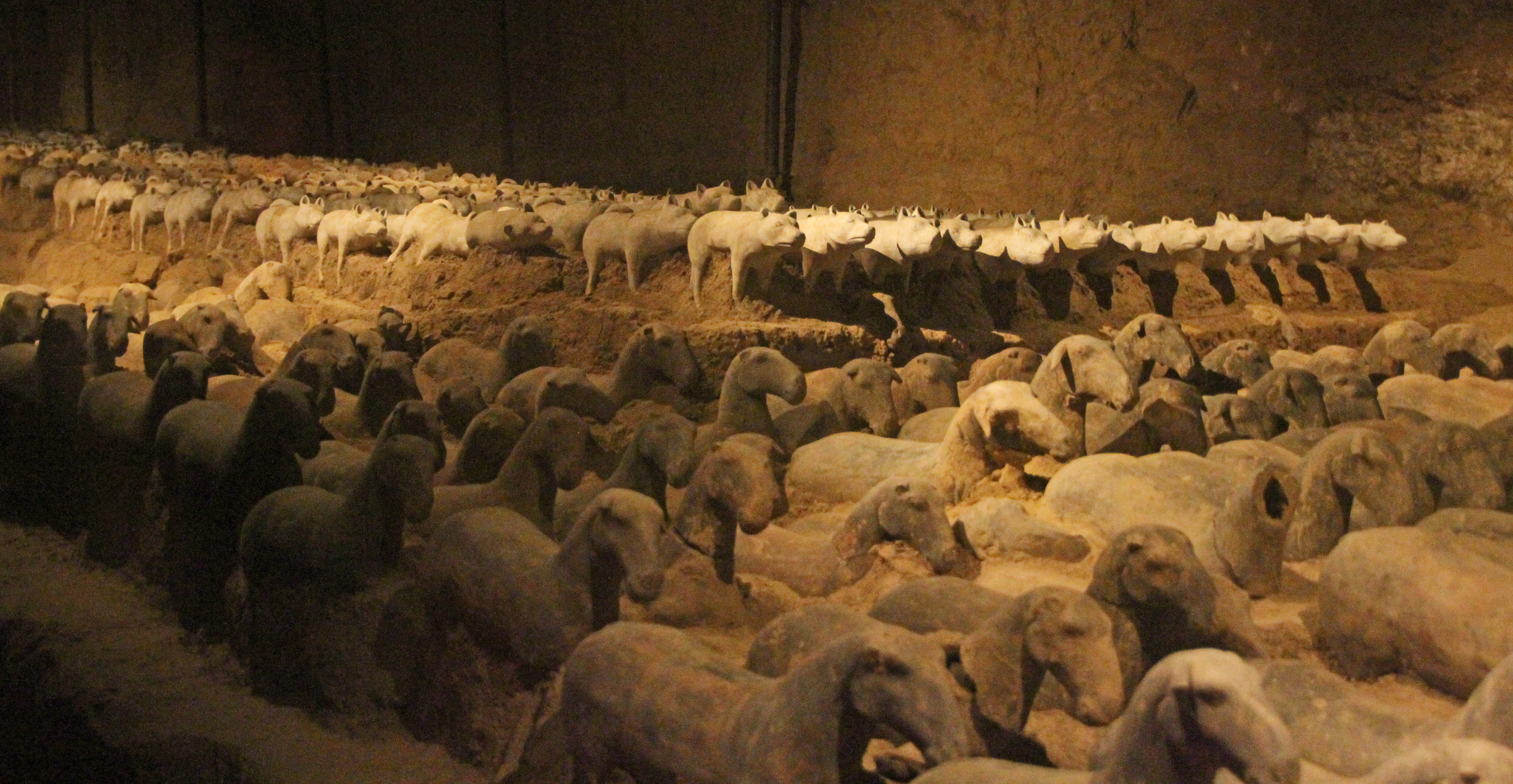
Yangling terracotta animals

== See also ==
- Terracotta Army
- Yangjiawan terracotta army
- Rule of Wen and Jing
