= Chu Fu =

Chinese Han dynasty occultist (d. 130 BC)

Chu Fu (Chinese: 楚服; pinyin: Chǔ Fú, died 130 BCE), was a Chinese Han dynasty occultist who was executed for witchcraft.

She is said to have tried to approach Empress Chen Jiao and teach her sorcery and love spells to get rid of a woman who was competing with Empress Chen for favor. Alternately, some versions of the tale suggest that Empress Chen turned to sorcery for aid in conceiving, desperate to bear a son after 10 years of marriage. Still other versions present the accusations of witchcraft as largely an excuse to be rid of the Empress, to replace her with a different woman. The Empress duly completed all of Chu Fu's requests, including drinking potions and sleeping with Chu Fu, who was dressed as a man.

When this supposed plot was discovered, Chen Jiao's husband Emperor Wu of Han ordered the imperial censor Zhang Tang to investigate. Zhang Tang's investigation found more than three hundred people who were implicated and executed. Chu Fu was publicly beheaded and her head hung up on public display. On the 14th day of the 7th month (Chinese calendar) Emperor Wu deposed the empress, confiscated her imperial seal, removed her title, and banished her to the Changmen Palace (長門宮).
