= Empress Dou (Wen) =

Empress of Han China from 179 to 157 BC

Dou Yifang

Empress of the Han dynasty
- Reign: 179–157 BC
- Predecessor: Empress Lü
- Successor: Empress Bo

Empress Dowager of the Han dynasty
- Reign: 157–141 BC
- Predecessor: Empress Dowager Bo
- Successor: Empress Wang Zhi

Grand Empress Dowager of the Han dynasty
- Reign: 141 – 29 June 135 BC
- Predecessor: Grand Empress Dowager Bo
- Successor: Grand Empress Dowager Shangguan
- Born: Dou Yifang c.205 BC; Qinghe, Zhao Kingdom, Western Han dynasty
- Died: 29 June 135 BC (aged 70)
- Spouse: Emperor Wen of Han
- Issue: Eldest Princess Guantao; Emperor Jing of Han; Liu Wu, Prince Xiao of Liang
Names
- Family name: Dou 竇 Given name: Yifang (猗房)
Posthumous name
- Empress Xiaowen (孝文皇后)
- Father: Dou Chong, Marquis Ancheng

Empress Dou (Chinese: 竇皇后; died 29 June 135 BC), personal name Dou Yifang, posthumous name Empress Xiaowen (孝文皇后), was an empress consort of the Chinese Western Han dynasty who greatly influenced the reigns of her husband Emperor Wen and her son Emperor Jing with her adherence to Taoist philosophy; she was the main supporter of the Huang-Lao school. She therefore contributed greatly to the Rule of Wen and Jing, commonly considered one of the golden ages of Chinese history.

== Early life ==
Empress Dou was born into a family in Qinghe Commandery (清河). She had two brothers, Dou Zhangjun (竇長君) and Dou Guangguo (竇廣國) or Shaojun (少君, probably courtesy name). When she was young, she was summoned into the palace to be a lady in waiting at the court of Emperor Hui. She would not see her brothers again for a very long time.

On one occasion, Emperor Hui's mother Empress Dowager Lü wanted to give some of the ladies in waiting to the imperial princes as gifts. Lady Dou was one of the ladies chosen. Because her home was part of the Principality of Zhao (modern central and southern Hebei), she requested that the eunuch in charge send her to Zhao. He agreed—but then forgot about it, and had her sent to the Principality of Dai (modern northern Shanxi and north-western Hebei), then considered a desolate region. When she found out, she cried and did not want to go, but had no choice.

That mistake by the eunuch turned out to be a fortunate one for Lady Dou, however. She became a favourite of Liu Heng, the Prince of Dai. They had a daughter Liu Piao, and two sons, Liu Qi and Liu Wu.

== As empress to Emperor Wen ==
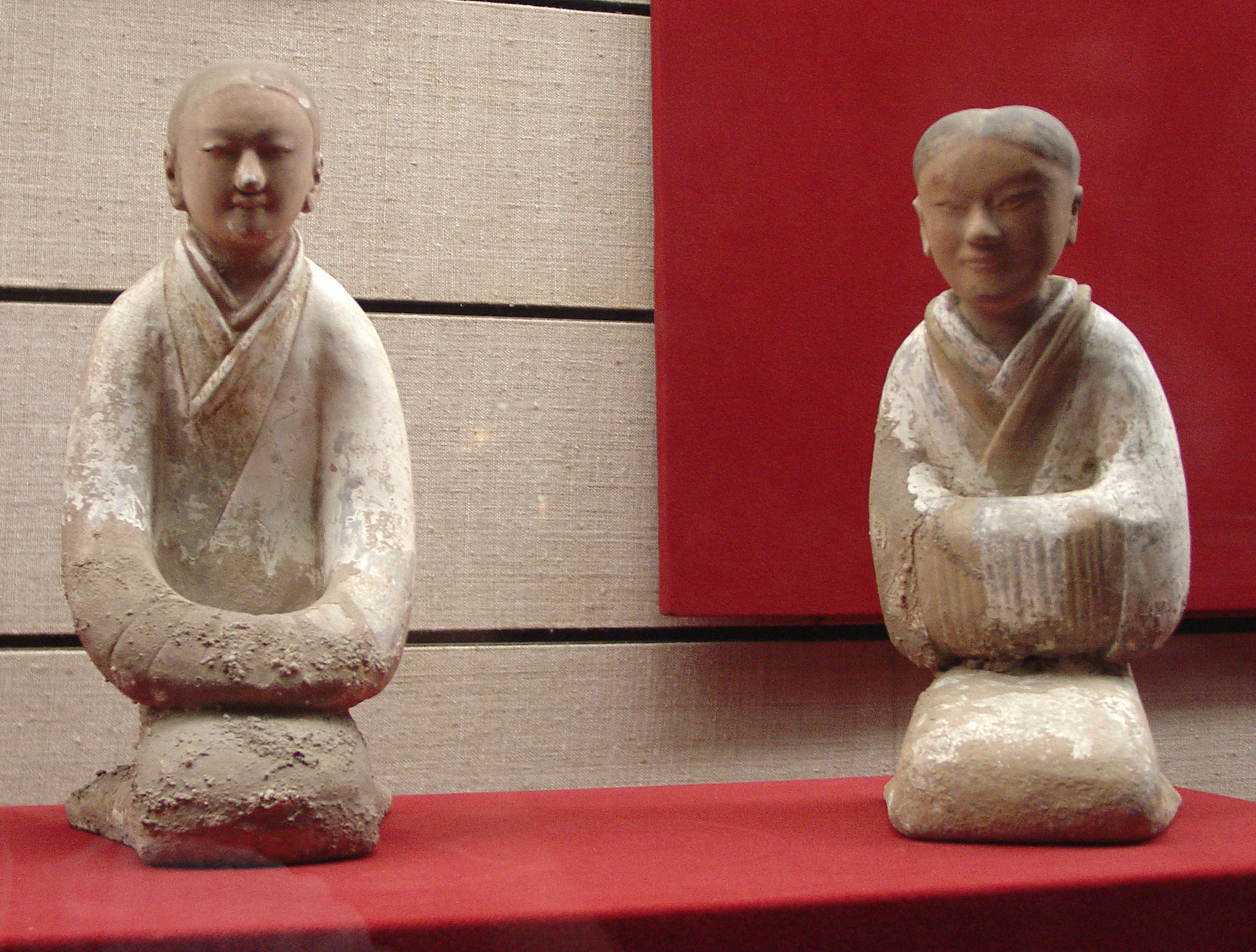
Ceramic female attendants, from the tomb of Empress Dou (d. 135 BC), Western Han dynasty, Shaanxi History Museum, Xi'an

After Prince Heng became emperor in the aftermaths of the Lü Clan Disturbance, then-Consort Dou, as the mother of his oldest son Prince Qi, was created empress in 179 BC. Prince Qi was created crown prince.

One of the first things that she carried out was a search for her brothers. Finding Zhangjun was not difficult. Finding Guangguo turned out to be difficult—and Guangguo had to find her himself, in one of the touching stories of Chinese antiquity. Shortly after Empress Dou was summoned as a lady in waiting, when he was only four or five years old, Guangguo himself was kidnapped and sold into slavery. He was sold from household to household for more than 10 times. Eventually, he was sold to a household in the capital Chang'an. There, he heard the news that the new empress was from Qinghe and named Dou. He therefore wrote a letter to the imperial palace, identifying himself, and relating an incident when they were young where they climbed a mulberry tree to gather its leaves, and he fell off it. Empress Dou summoned him and questioned him further to try to ascertain if he was in fact her brother. He then related details about their separation:

When my sister was about to be summoned west to Chang'an, we said our farewells at the imperial messenger station. She bathed me and fed me one last time before she left.

Empress Dou immediately held him and cried, and all of her ladies in waiting and eunuchs, seeing the touching scene, also cried. She then gave her brothers much wealth and built them mansions in Chang'an. At the suggestion of the officials who had overthrown the Lü clans and were fearful of a repeat, the Dou brothers were given companions of humility and virtue to try to influence them positively, and they became humble and virtuous themselves.

Either early in her husband's reign as emperor, or while he was still the Prince of Dai, Empress Dou became a strict adherent to Taoist philosophy, as encapsulated in the writing of Lao Zi and the legendary writings attributed to the Yellow Emperor—the idea of favouring inaction over action, of non-interference with others and nature, and of thriftiness in living. She ordered that her children (including Prince Qi), grandchildren, and the members of the Dou clan all study these writings. Obviously, she could not order her husband Emperor Wen to do so, but Emperor Wen was nevertheless heavily influenced by the Taoist ideas during his reign.

== As empress dowager ==
After Emperor Wen died in 157 BC, Crown Prince Qi succeeded to the throne as Emperor Jing, and Empress Dou became empress dowager. He became heavily influenced by his mother both in terms of governing philosophy and politics, and he largely continued his father's policies. He also created her brother Guangguo and her nephew Dou Pengzu (竇彭祖, Zhangjun's son) marquesses. A major concern for Empress Dou was the welfare of her young son, Liu Wu, who had by that point been created the Prince of Liang, and he, at her suggestion, seriously considered making him crown prince over one of his own sons, although he ultimately did not do so. In any case, however, the Principality of Liang, because of imperial favours and its own location as prime farmland, became exceedingly wealthy.

Whether Empress Dowager Dou favoured Emperor Jing's policies of reducing principality sizes—which eventually led to the Rebellion of the Seven States in 154 BC—is unknown. During that rebellion, however, her heart was wrenched when the Principality of Liang was under heavy attack by the rebelling princes. She wanted Zhou Yafu, the commander of the imperial forces, to relieve Liang as soon as possible, but Zhou correctly concluded that the better strategy was to bypass Liang and cut off the rebels' supply lines first. Zhou's strategy would lead to victory, but would also earn him the enmity of Prince Wu and Empress Dowager Dou. She was probably pleased when Zhou, then under arrest under false charges of treason, committed suicide in 143 BC.

Empress Dowager Dou's concerns for Prince Wu would be tested again in 148 BC. Prince Wu, whose contribution in repelling the rebels during the Rebellion of the Seven States had earned him the privilege of using many imperial styles, wanted to be crown prince. This was favored by Empress Dowager Dou as well, but opposed by officials, who believed such a move would bring instability to dynastic succession. When Prince Wu sought permission to build a highway directly from his capital Suiyang (睢陽, in modern Shangqiu, Henan) to Chang'an, the same officials, fearing that the highway might be used for military purposes if Liang rebelled, opposed it. Prince Wu had these officials assassinated. Emperor Jing was extremely angry and sent many investigators to Liang to track down the conspirators, whom Prince Wu eventually surrendered. However, Emperor Jing was greatly displeased. Prince Wu, in order to show contrition to regain his brother's favor, thought of a plan and carried it out. On his next official visit to the capital, when he got to the Hangu Pass, he eluded his train as well as the imperial train that had been sent to welcome him, and instead took a side road to Chang'an, to the house of his sister Liu Piao. (When the imperial train could not locate Prince Wu, both Emperor Jing and Empress Dowager Dou was greatly distressed, and she accused him of killing Prince Wu.) Prince Wu then appeared before the imperial palace, half-naked, and bearing a cutting board on his back, in a manner of a criminal ready to be slaughtered. Both Emperor Jing and Empress Dowager Dou was greatly touched, and Emperor Jing pardoned him on the spot. However, he would no longer consider him a potential heir. When Prince Wu died in 144 BC, Empress Dowager Dou greatly mourned him, and could not be consoled easily until Emperor Jing created all five of Prince Wu's sons princes themselves.

When Empress Dowager Dou's grandson Liu Rong, the Prince of Linjiang (and former crown prince), was imprisoned in 148 BC for intruding onto the grounds of Emperor Wen's temple when building walls to his palace, it is unknown whether Empress Dowager Dou tried to intercede on his behalf. However, after he was ultimately forced to commit suicide, she was greatly saddened, and she eventually ordered, against Emperor Jing's wishes, that the official who forced Prince Rong to commit suicide, Zhi Du (郅都), be executed on a minor offence.

== As grand empress dowager ==
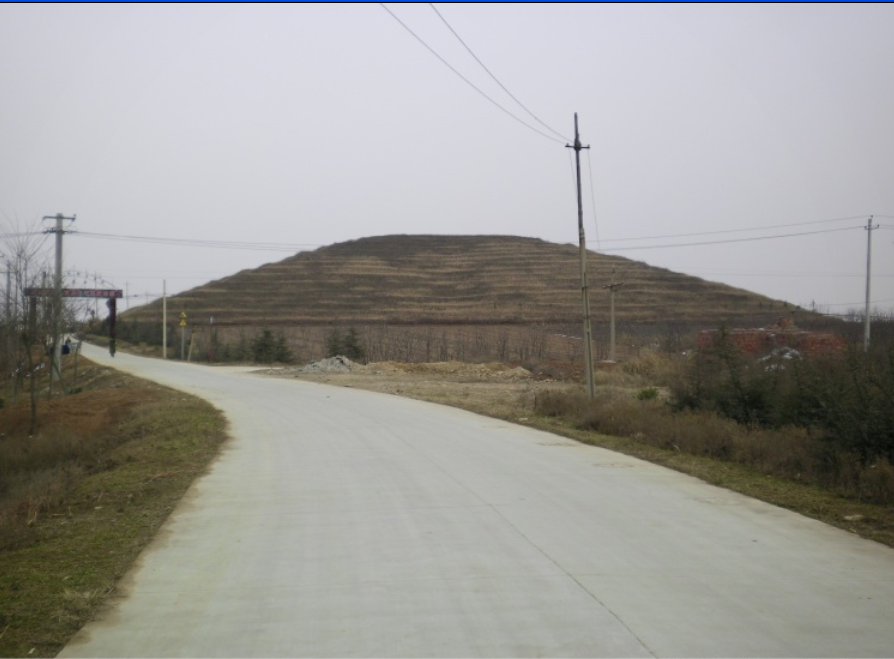
Tomb of Empress Dou in Xi'an, Shaanxi

When Emperor Jing died in 141 BC, Empress Dowager Dou became grand empress dowager over his son and her grandson, Emperor Wu. Grand Empress Dowager Dou forced her grandson to consult her before finalizing or deciding on sensitive matters; The prime minister and government officials planned and submitted important decisions to Emperor Wu. Emperor Wu decided on matters but could not directly execute them. Before issuing any decree, he had to report it to the Eastern Palace, where the Grand Empress Dowager Dou resided. If the Grand Empress Dowager Dou approved, then the emperor was allowed to issue the decree; however, on matters that were problematic or controversial, the emperor had to first consult the Grand Empress Dowager Dou before making a decision. Early in his reign, in 140 BC, he would make Confucianism the official state ideology, replacing Taoism. Grand Empress Dowager Dou would try to resist this, however, as she despised Confucians. In 139 BC, when in response, Confucian officials Zhao Wan (趙綰) and Wang Zang (王臧) advised the emperor to no longer consult the grand empress dowager, she had them investigated and tried for corruption, and they committed suicide. Early in Emperor Wu's reign, then, even though there was an official shift in ideology, the policies remained largely constant to the reigns of Emperors Wen and Jing. This would change after Grand Empress Dowager Dou's death in 135 BC. She was buried with her husband Emperor Wen. In her will, she left her possessions to her daughter, Princess Liu Piao.

== Impact on Chinese history ==
Empress Dou was one of the earliest politically dominating female figures in Chinese history. Unlike her stepmother-in-law Empress Lü, despite her shortcomings in nepotistic behaviour, she is largely viewed positively, for her impact on her husband and son and the consequent benefit to the people.

== Media ==
- She is portrayed by Sally Chen in the 2001 Chinese television series The Prince of Han Dynasty.
- She is portrayed by Ruby Lin in the 2011 Chinese television series Beauty's Rival in Palace.
- She is portrayed by Sally Chen in the 2014 Chinese television series The Virtuous Queen of Han.

== Notes ==
- Book of Han, vol. 97, part 1.
- Zizhi Tongjian, vols. 13, 14, 15, 16, 17.

Chinese royalty
Preceded by Empress Lü	Empress of the Western Han dynasty 179–157 BC	Succeeded by Empress Bo
