= Wang Zhi (empress) =

Empress of Han China from 150 to 141 BC

Empress Xiaojing 孝景皇后

Empress consort of the Han dynasty
- Tenure: 6 June 150 BC – 9 March 141 BC
- Predecessor: Empress Bo
- Successor: Empress Chen

Empress Dowager of the Han Dynasty
- Tenure: 9 March 141 BC - 25 June 126 BC
- Predecessor: Empress Dowager Dou
- Successor: Empress Dowager Shangguan
- Born: 180s? BC; Huaili, Western Han
- Died: 25 June 126 BC; Western Han
- Burial: Yang Mausoleum, Xianyang, Shaanxi Province
- Spouse: Jin Wangsun; Emperor Jing of Han
- Issue: Jin Su, Lady of Xiucheng; Grand Princess Yangxin; Princess Nangong; Princess Longlü; Emperor Wu of Han
Names
- Family name: Wang (王); Given name: Zhi (娡)
Posthumous name
- Xiaojing (孝景)
- Father: Wang Zhong
- Mother: Zang Er, Lady of Pingyuan

Empress Xiaojing (孝景皇后, 180s? BC – 25 June 126 BC), of the Wang clan, also known by her birth name Wang Zhi (王娡) and by the title Madame Wang (王夫人), was an empress during the Han dynasty. She was the second wife of Emperor Jing and the mother of Emperor Wu. She was also the first known empress of China who was previously married to another man before becoming empress.

== Family background and first marriage ==
Wang Zhi was born to Wang Zhong (王仲) and Zang Er (臧兒), who was a granddaughter of Zang Tu, the one-time King of Yan appointed by Xiang Yu until the fifth year of Emperor Gaozu (202 BC). Zang Tu rebelled against the Emperor and was defeated. He and his entire family was massacred, but Zang Er managed to escape.

Wang Zhi's parents had, in addition to her, an older son, Wang Xin (王信) and a younger daughter, Wang Erxu (王兒姁). They lived in Huaili (槐里, in modern Xianyang, Shaanxi). After her father died, her mother remarried a man surnamed Tian (田), and had two more sons: Tian Fen (田蚡) and Tian Sheng (田勝).

When Wang Zhi was young, she was married to a local man named Jin Wangsun (金王孫), and had a daughter named Jin Su (金俗). However, her mother was told by a soothsayer that both of her daughters would become extremely honoured. Zang Er decided to offer her daughters to the crown prince, Liu Qi, and, to do so, forcibly divorced Wang Zhi from her husband. Wang Zhi was then sent along with her sister, Wang Erxu, to the Crown Prince's palace to join his concubinage.

== As consort to the emperor ==
After being offered to the Crown Prince, both Wang Zhi and Wang Erxu became favoured. She then bore him three daughters: Grand Princess Yangxin (陽信長公主), Princess Nangong (南宮公主) and Princess Longlü (隆慮公主), and later a son named Liu Che (劉徹) who was still in the womb when Liu Qi ascended to the throne as Emperor Jing of Han after Emperor Wen's death in July 157 BC. Her sister bore Liu Qi four sons: Liu Yue, Prince Hui of Guangchuan (廣川惠王 劉越), Liu Ji, Prince Kang of Jiaodong (膠東康王 劉寄), Liu Cheng, Prince Ai of Qinghe (清河哀王 劉乘), and Liu Shun, Prince Xian of Changshan (常山憲王 劉舜).

When Wang Zhi was pregnant with Liu Che, she claimed that she dreamed that the sun had fallen into her womb. Emperor Jing was ecstatic over the divine implication, and made Liu Che (his 10th son) the Prince of Jiaodong (膠東王) in May 153 BC. Wang Zhi was also promoted to a consort for giving birth to a royal prince.

Emperor Jing's formal wife, Empress Bo, was childless. As a result, Emperor Jing's oldest son Liu Rong (劉榮), born of the Emperor's other favourite concubine, Lady Li (栗姬), was created crown prince in May 153 BC. Lady Li, feeling certain that her son would become the emperor, grew arrogant and intolerant, and frequently threw tantrums at Emperor Jing out of jealousy over his favouring of other concubines. Her lack of tact would prove to be Consort Wang's chance.

When Emperor Jing's older sister, Elder Princess Guantao (館陶長公主) Liu Piao (劉嫖), offered to marry her daughter Chen Jiao (陳嬌) to Liu Rong, Lady Li rudely rejected the proposal, complaining that Princess Guantao often offered new concubines as prostitutes to Emperor Jing. Angered by this snub, Elder Princess Guantao encouraged Emperor Jing not to favour Lady Li.

Consort Wang, who had been observing quietly and waiting for her chance, took the opportunity and secured a marriage alliance by offering to marry her 5-year-old son Liu Che with Chen Jiao. Now siding with Consort Wang, Princess Guantao constantly criticised Lady Li in front of Emperor Jing. Gradually accepting his sister's concerns, Emperor Jing decided to test out Lady Li. One day he asked Lady Li that whether she would happily look after and properly raise the rest of his children if he was to pass away, only to have Lady Li rudely (and foolishly) refuse to comply. This made Emperor Jing angry and he became worried that if Liu Rong was to inherit the throne and Lady Li became Empress Dowager, many of his concubines might suffer the fate of Consort Qi.

Seizing the opportunity, Consort Wang put in place the final straw against Lady Li. She persuaded a minister to advise Emperor Jing to make Lady Li empress as Liu Rong was already the crown prince. Emperor Jing, already of the view that Lady Li must not be made empress, was enraged and believed that Lady Li had conspired with government officials. He executed that minister who put forward that proposal, and demoted Liu Rong to the Prince of Linjiang (臨江王) in 150 BC and exiled him out of the capital city Chang'an. Lady Li was stripped of her titles and placed under house arrest, and died of frustration and depression not long after.

Since Empress Bo's deposition one year earlier, the position of empress was open. Emperor Jing, who had always considered Liu Che to be his favourite son, soon made Consort Wang empress on 6 June. Liu Che, now legally the oldest son of the Empress, was later made crown prince on 18 June.

== As empress ==
Remembering the lesson of Empress Bo's and Lady Li's fate, despite her highest rank and honoured position as empress, Empress Wang did not try to assert as much influence on her husband as her mother-in-law, Empress Dowager Dou, had asserted over her father-in-law, Emperor Wen. Although Empress Wang was her husband's favorite and Liu Che was Emperor Jing's heir and favorite son, she was very tolerant and submissive of her mother-in-law and sister-in-law because of her and her son's position. She had good relations with her mother-in-law, and both she and her brother Wang Xin played important parts in calming Emperor Jing over his anger against his younger brother Liu Wu (劉武), the Prince Xiao of Liang, and the favoured young son of Empress Dowager Dou, when Liu Wu assassinated a number of court officials in 148 BC for opposing the proposal to have him appointed the heir apparent. It was because of this that Empress Dowager Dou wanted to create Wang Xin a marquess, a move initially blocked by his prime minister, Zhou Yafu (周亞夫), although Emperor Jing eventually carried out the promotion of Wang Xin. She was probably pleased when Zhou Yafu committed suicide in 143 BC after being falsely accused of treason and arrested. When Emperor Jing died in March 141 BC, Crown Prince Che succeeded to the throne as Emperor Wu, and Empress Wang became empress dowager.

== As empress dowager ==
After Empress Wang became empress dowager, her son carried out several immediate acts to honour her family members. Her mother Lady Zang Er was created the Lady of Pingyuan, and her half-brothers were created marquesses. Her daughter Jin Su, from her previous marriage, was tracked down and personally visited by Emperor Wu, and he created her the Lady of Xiucheng (修成君). She was awarded 300 servants, 100 acres of land, and a grand mansion. Jin Su's daughter was married to a prince.

Empress Dowager Wang exerted significant influence on her son. For example, with her approval, her half-brother Tian Fen became the commander of the armed forces and exerted power even beyond the military affairs. Initially, her influence was balanced and outweighed by that of her mother-in-law, Grand Empress Dowager Dou. With Grand Empress Dowager Dou's death in June 135 BC, Empress Dowager Wang became the paramount figure at court. Later in 135 BC Tian Fen was made chancellor, although her son gradually justified this position as he matured. For example, in 133 BC, in the aftermath of the failed attempt to capture the Xiongnu Chanyu at the Battle of Mayi, Emperor Wu wanted to execute the key strategist, Wang Hui (王恢, no relation to the dowager empress), who bribed Tian, who in turn persuaded the empress dowager to speak on Wang Hui's behalf. Emperor Wu refused to accept her intercession and forced Wang Hui to commit suicide. However, it was at her behest that Emperor Wu executed his grand uncle Dou Ying (竇嬰, the Empress Dou's cousin) in 132 BC for having insulted Tian.

Mound of Empress Wang Zhi's tomb in Han Yang Ling

Empress Dowager Wang died in June 126 BC, and was buried with her second husband Emperor Jing.

== Media ==
- Portrayed by Li Jianqun in the 1996 Chinese television series Han Wudi.
- Portrayed by Xu Lin in the 2001 Chinese television series Da Han Tian Zi.
- Portrayed by Wang Likun in the 2011 Chinese television series Beauty's Rival in Palace.
- Portrayed by Yu Xiaofan in the 2014 Chinese television series The Virtuous Queen of Han.

== Notes ==
Chinese royalty
Preceded by Empress Bo	Empress of Western Han Dynasty; 6 Jun 150 – Mar 141 BC	Succeeded by Empress Chen Jiao
