= Liu Rong =

Crown Prince of Han dynasty (died 148 BC)

Liu Rong (Chinese: 劉榮) (died c.April 148 BC), posthumously known as Prince Min of Linjiang (臨江閔王), was the eldest son of Emperor Jing of the Han dynasty. His mother was Lady Li (栗姬). He was made crown prince of the empire on 16 May 153 BC, but demoted less than three years later to Prince of Linjiang, on 17 January 150 BCE. He had the dubious honor of becoming the first deposed crown prince in Chinese imperial history.

It was recorded that the reason for his demotion was the ill-will between his mother and Princess Liu Piao, Emperor Jing's older sister. Liu Piao had attempted to matchmake her daughter Chen Jiao with Liu Rong, but was rebuffed by Lady Li; Lady Li herself was displeased with the princess for her frequently recommending beautiful women to Emperor Jing. Incensed, Liu Piao then turned her attention towards Wang Zhi (then a concubine with the rank of meiren); eventually, Chen Jiao was married to Wang Zhi's son Liu Che, the later Emperor Wu of Han. Liu Piao then began frequently defaming Lady Li in front of Emperor Jing, while promoting Wang Zhi at the same time. Emperor Jing himself grew displeased with Lady Li after a particular incident: while being seriously ill, Emperor Jing had asked Lady Li to look after the other concubines and their sons after his death. Lady Li not only refused to do so, but was also immensely rude to Emperor Jing in the process. After his recovery, Emperor Jing began to reconsider the positions of Lady Li and Liu Rong. Knowing the precarious situation Lady Li was in, Wang Zhi then encouraged an official to formally propose to Emperor Jing that since Liu Rong was now crown prince, Lady Li should be made empress. This move infuriated Emperor Jing, who had the official put to death, and demoted Liu Rong to Prince of Linjiang.

He was imprisoned in 148 BC for trespassing on the grounds of the temple of Emperor Wen (his grandfather) while building walls for his own palace. He was ultimately forced to commit suicide by the official Zhi Du (郅都). His grandmother, the Dowager Empress Dou, later had Zhi Du executed for a minor offense.
