= Emperor Jing of Han =

Emperor of the Han dynasty from 157 to 141 BC

Emperor Jing of Han 漢景帝
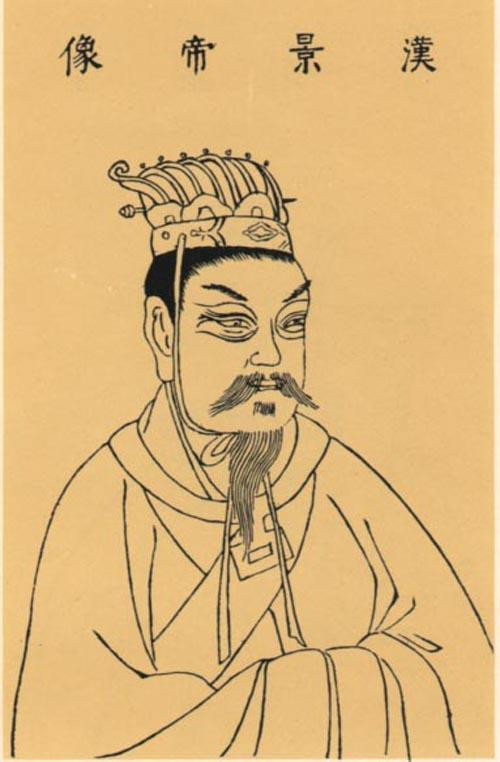
- Depiction of Emperor Jing in Sancai Tuhui

Emperor of the Han dynasty
- Reign: 14 July 157 – 9 March 141 BC
- Predecessor: Emperor Wen
- Successor: Emperor Wu
- Born: Liu Qi (劉啟); 188 BC; Jinyang
- Died: 10 March 141 BC (aged 47); Chang'an
- Burial: Yang Mausoleum
- Consorts: Empress Bo; Empress Xiaojing
- Issue: Liu Rong, Prince Min of Linjiang; Liu Sheng, Prince of Zhongshan; Emperor Wu of Han; Grand Princess Yangxin
Names
- Family name: Liu (劉); Given name: Qi (啟)
Posthumous name
- Short: Emperor Jing (景); Full: Emperor Xiaojing (孝景皇帝)
- House: Liu
- Dynasty: Han (Western Han)
- Father: Emperor Wen of Han
- Mother: Empress Xiaowen

Emperor Jing of Han (188 BC – 9 March 141 BC), born Liu Qi, was the sixth emperor of the Han dynasty from 157 to 141 BC. His reign saw the limiting of the power of the feudal kings and princes which resulted in the Rebellion of the Seven States in 154 BC. Emperor Jing managed to crush the revolt and princes were thereafter denied rights to appoint ministers for their fiefs. This move helped to consolidate central power which paved the way for the long reign of his son Emperor Wu of Han.

Emperor Jing had a complicated personality. He continued his father Emperor Wen's policy of general non-interference with the people, reduced tax and other burdens, and promoted government thrift. He continued and magnified his father's policy of reduction in criminal sentences. His light governance of the people was due to the Taoist influences of his mother, Empress Dou. Still, during his reign he arrested and imprisoned Zhou Yafu, and he was generally ungrateful to his wife Empress Bo.

He was the last emperor of Han who was the common ancestor of all subsequent emperors; all subsequent emperors of the Western Han were descendants of Emperor Wu, while all emperors of the Eastern Han were descendants of his sixth son Liu Fa, Prince Ding of Changsha.

== Early life and career as crown prince ==
Emperor Jing was born to Emperor Wen, then Prince of Dai, and Consort Dou, one of his favorite consorts, in 188 BC. He was his father's oldest son. After his father became emperor in November 180 BC, then-Prince Qi was made crown prince in February or March 179 BC. Two months later, his mother was made empress.

In his childhood as crown prince, Prince Qi was praised for being compassionate. He was deeply influenced by his mother Empress Dou, who was a Taoist and required all of her children and grandchildren to study Taoist doctrines. He also developed deep bonds with his older sister Princess Liu Piao (劉嫖) and his younger brother Liu Wu (劉武), both also born of Empress Dou.

As Prince Qi grew in age, as was customary, he established his own household, and a member of his household, Chao Cuo (晁錯), known for his intelligence and ruthless efficiency as well as his rhetorical talent, became a trusted adviser of Prince Qi. Despite this, Liu Qi has been known to take an epicurean lifestyle to the point that Emperor Wen once considered deposing him as Crown Prince to Liu Wu, Prince of Liang, but dropped the matter, as many officials opposed the idea.

In July 157 BC, Emperor Wen died, and Prince Qi became emperor. In accordance with Emperor Wen's will, the period of mourning was shortened. Emperor Jing's grandmother Empress Dowager Bo became grand empress dowager, and Empress Dou became empress dowager. Prince Qi's wife, Crown Princess Bo (a member of his grandmother's clan) became empress.

== Early reign ==
A description of Emperor Jing at the entrance of the on-site museum at Han Yang Ling

When he became Emperor, in contrast with many officials' thinking, which was that Emperor Jing would be a bad leader like Jie of Xia, King Zhou of Shang and King You of Zhou, with the danger of collapse of the Han dynasty imminent, the officials were shocked at Liu Qi's sudden change of personality and he proved to be a capable ruler. Emperor Jing was deeply and strongly influenced by his mother, Empress Dou, who was considered powerful and dangerous both because of her position as the emperor's mother and because of the influence she had on the emperor. Because of her influence, Emperor Jing largely continued his father's policy of non-interference with the people and reduction of tax and other burdens. Under Jing, taxes were cut in half, to one-thirtieth of the crop. He continued his policy of reducing criminal penalties, and in 156 BC, in reaction to the reality that his father's abolition of corporal punishments of cutting off nose and feet were in fact causing more people to die from whipping, reduced the number of whips that criminals would receive. (He would later reduce the penalty again in 144 BC.) He also continued his father's policy of heqin (marriage treaties) with Xiongnu, which largely avoided large conflicts with that northern neighbor. However, one immediate issue confronting Emperor Jing was the power possessed by princes of collateral lines of the imperial clan. The princes often built up their own military strengths and resisted edicts issued by the emperor. This was already an issue in Emperor Wen's days, but Emperor Wen did not take any decisive actions on the issue.

Emperor Jing did not designate a crown prince for the first few years of his reign, because Empress Bo did not have any sons. His mother, the Dowager Empress Dou, wanted him to make his younger brother Liu Wu, the Prince of Liang, the crown prince, but this did not happen because of opposition by officials. However, Liu Wu was given many privileges not given to other princes.

== The Rebellion of the Seven States ==
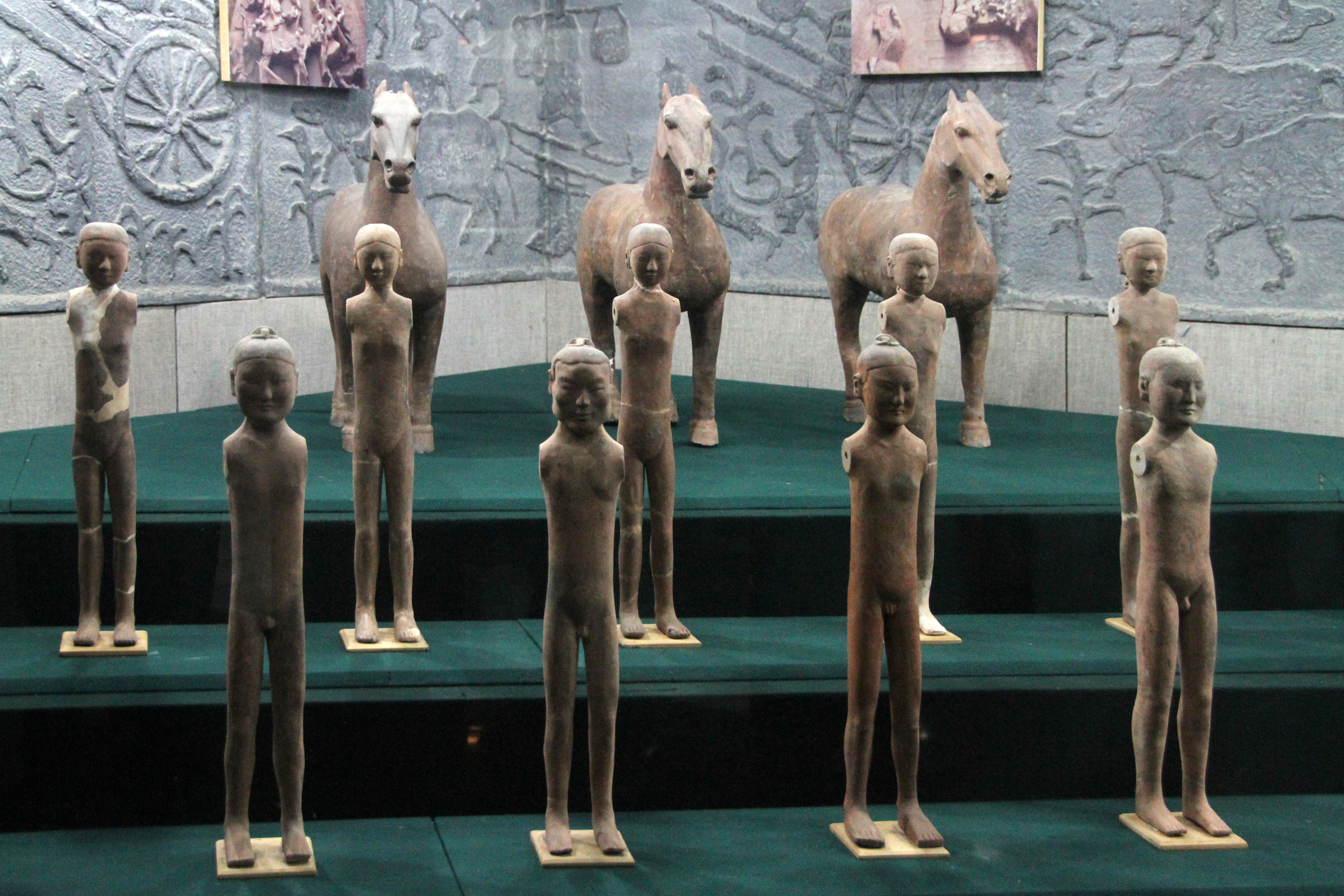
Yangling mausoleum miniature pottery infantry (foreground) and cavalry (background); in 1990, when the tomb complex of Emperor Jing of Han (r. 157–141 BC) and his wife Empress Wang Zhi (d. 126 BC) was excavated north of Yangling, over 40,000 miniature pottery figures were unearthed. All of them were one-third life size, smaller than the 8,000-some fully life size soldiers of the Terracotta Army buried alongside the First Emperor of Qin. Smaller miniature figurines, on average 60 centimeters (24 in) in height, have also been found in various royal Han tombs where they were placed to guard the deceased tomb occupants in their afterlife.

The issue of dealing with powerful princes would soon erupt into a war later known as the Rebellion of the Seven States. Emperor Jing already had an inimical relationship with his cousin-once-removed (a nephew of his grandfather Emperor Gaozu) Liu Pi (劉濞), the prince of the wealthy Principality of Wu (modern southern Jiangsu, northern Zhejiang, southern Anhui, and northern Jiangxi), which enjoyed, among other natural resources, abundant copper and salt supplies. While Emperor Jing was crown prince, Liu Pi's heir apparent Liu Xian (劉賢) had been on an official visit to the capital Chang'an, and they gambled together by playing the liubo board game (heavily tied to divination and predictions of the future). While playing the board game, Liu Xian offended then-Crown Prince Qi, and Prince Qi threw the wooden board at Liu Xian, killing him. Liu Pi thus had great hatred for the new emperor.

Chao Cuo's advice for Emperor Jing was to, using as excuses offenses that princes have committed which had generally been ignored by Emperor Wen, cut down the sizes of the principalities to make them less threatening. Chao explicitly contemplated the possibility that Wu and other principalities may rebel, but justified the action by asserting that if they were going to rebel, it would be better to let them rebel earlier than later, when they might be more prepared. Under this theory, Emperor Jing, in 154 BC, carved out one commandery each from the Principalities of Chu (modern northern Jiangsu and northern Anhui) and Zhao and six counties from the Principality of Jiaoxi (roughly modern Weifang, Shandong), before carving two commanderies out of Wu.

Wu did indeed start a rebellion, in alliance with Chu, Jiaoxi, Zhao, and three other smaller principalities—Jiaodong, Zichuan, and Jinan. Two other principalities that originally agreed to join, Qi (modern central Shandong) and Jibei (modern northwestern Shandong), reneged at the final moment. Wu also sought assistance from the independent kingdoms of Dong'ou (modern Zhejiang) and Minyue (modern Fujian); while Dong'ou contributed forces, Minyue did not. Zhao sought assistance from Xiongnu, but while Xiongnu initially agreed to help, it did not actually enter the war.

In accordance with instructions left by Emperor Wen, Emperor Jing commissioned Zhou Yafu as the commander of his armed forces to face the main rebel force—joint forces of Wu and Chu. However, he soon panicked at the prospect of losing, and at the suggestion of Chao Cuo's enemy Yuan Ang, he executed Chao to try to appease the seven princes, to no avail.

Wu and Chu forces were fiercely attacking the Principality of Liang (modern eastern Henan), whose prince Liu Wu, prince of Liang was Emperor Jing's beloved younger brother, and Emperor Jing ordered Zhou to immediately head to Liang to save it. Zhou refused, reasoning that the proper strategy would involve first cutting off the Wu and Chu supply lines, thus starving them, so he headed to the northeast side of Liang and around the Wu and Chu forces to cut off their supplies. The strategy was effective. Wu and Chu, unable to capture Liang quickly and realizing that their supplies were dwindling, headed northeast to attack Zhou. After being unable to get a decisive victory against Zhou, the Wu and Chu forces collapsed from starvation. Liu Pi fled to Donghai, which killed him and sought peace with Han. Liu Wu, the Prince of Chu, committed suicide. The other principalities involved were all eventually defeated as well.

== Middle reign and succession issues ==
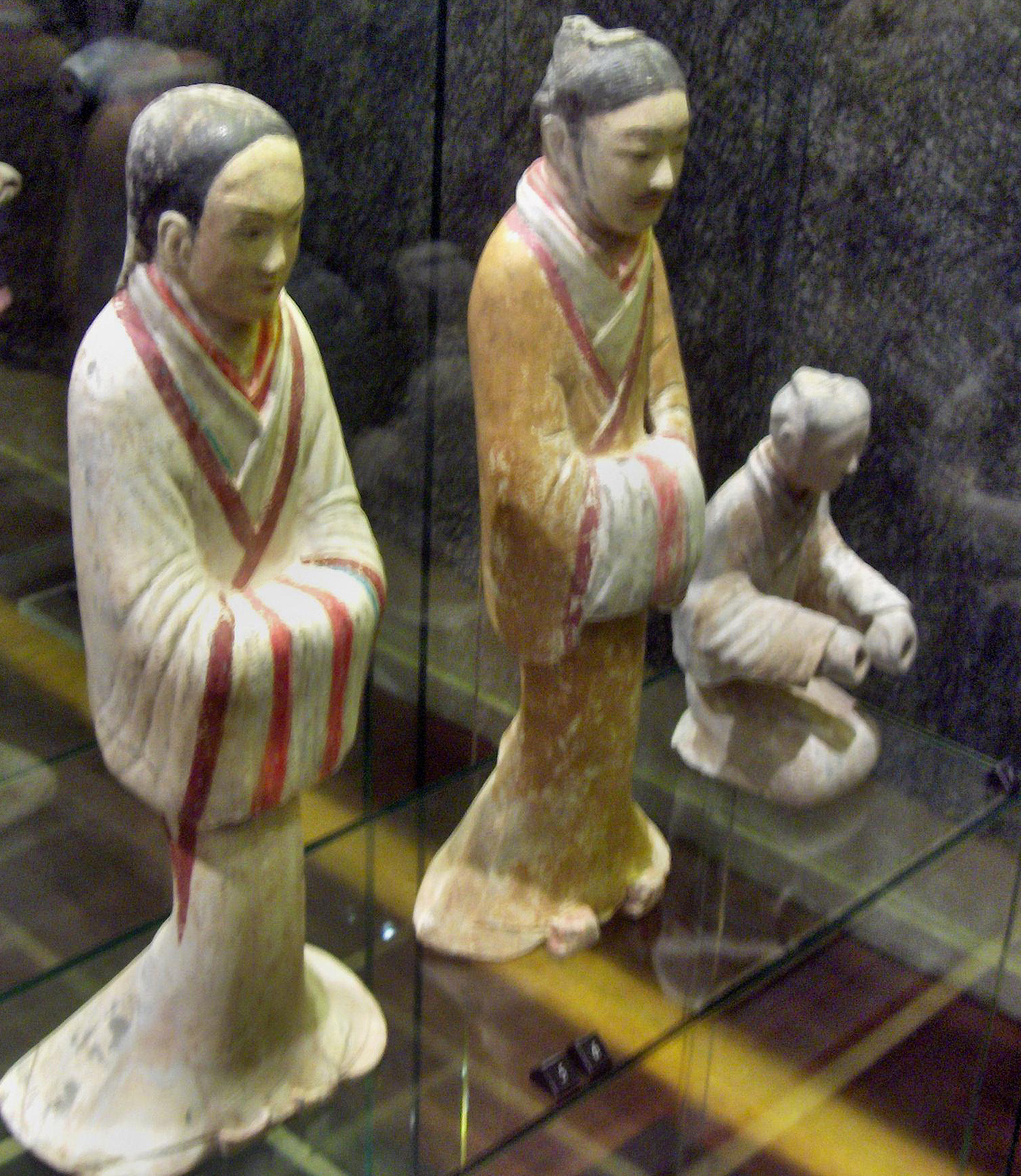
Tomb figures from the Yangling Mausoleum of Han

In 153 BC, because Empress Bo did not have a son, Emperor Jing made his oldest son Liu Rong (劉榮) crown prince. This made Liu Rong's mother, Consort Li (栗姬), who was one of Emperor Jing's favorite concubines, think she would be made empress, particularly after Empress Bo was deposed in 151 BC, following Grand Empress Dowager Bo's death. She hated Emperor Jing's sister Princess Liu Piao, because Princess Piao had often given her brother beautiful women as concubines, drawing Consort Li's jealousy. When Princess Piao wanted to end this dispute by giving her daughter Chen Jiao as wife to Prince Rong, Consort Li refused.

Princess Piao, seeing the precarious state that she would be in if Consort Li became empress dowager one day, carried out an alternative plan. She gave Chen Jiao as wife to Liu Che, the son of Emperor Jing's other favorite concubine, Wang Zhi, the Prince of Jiaodong. She then incessantly criticized Consort Li for her jealousy—pointing out that, if Consort Li became empress dowager, many concubines might suffer the fates of Consort Qi, Emperor Gao's favorite concubine who was tortured and killed by Emperor Gao's wife Lü Zhi after Emperor Gao's death. Emperor Jing eventually agreed, and he deposed Prince Rong from his position in 150 BC. Consort Li died in anger. That year, Consort Wang was made empress, and Prince Che the crown prince.

Prince Rong would not be spared. In 148 BC, he was accused of intruding onto the grounds of his grandfather Emperor Wen's temple when building the walls to his palace. He was imprisoned and not permitted to write to his father. His granduncle Dou Ying (竇嬰, Empress Dowager Dou's brother or cousin) slipped in a knife pen; he wrote a letter and then committed suicide. (Note: Liu Rong's biographies in Shiji and Han Shu did not mention Dou Ying.)

A major incident involving another potential heir, Prince Wu of Liang, erupted in 148 BC as well. Prince Wu, because of his contributions to the victory during the Rebellion of the Seven States, was further given privilege to use imperial ceremonies and colors. Members of his household encouraged him to seek to become crown prince. This was favored by the empress dowager Dou as well, but opposed by the minister Yuan Ang, who believed such a move would bring instability to dynastic succession. When Prince Wu sought permission to build a highway directly from his capital Suiyang to Chang'an, Yuan, fearing that the highway might be used for military purposes if Liang rebelled, opposed it. Prince Wu had him assassinated. Emperor Jing was extremely angry and sent many investigators to Liang to track down the conspirators, whom Prince Wu eventually surrendered. Emperor Jing, afraid of offending his mother and still affectionate for his brother, pardoned Prince Wu but no longer considered him as possible heir.

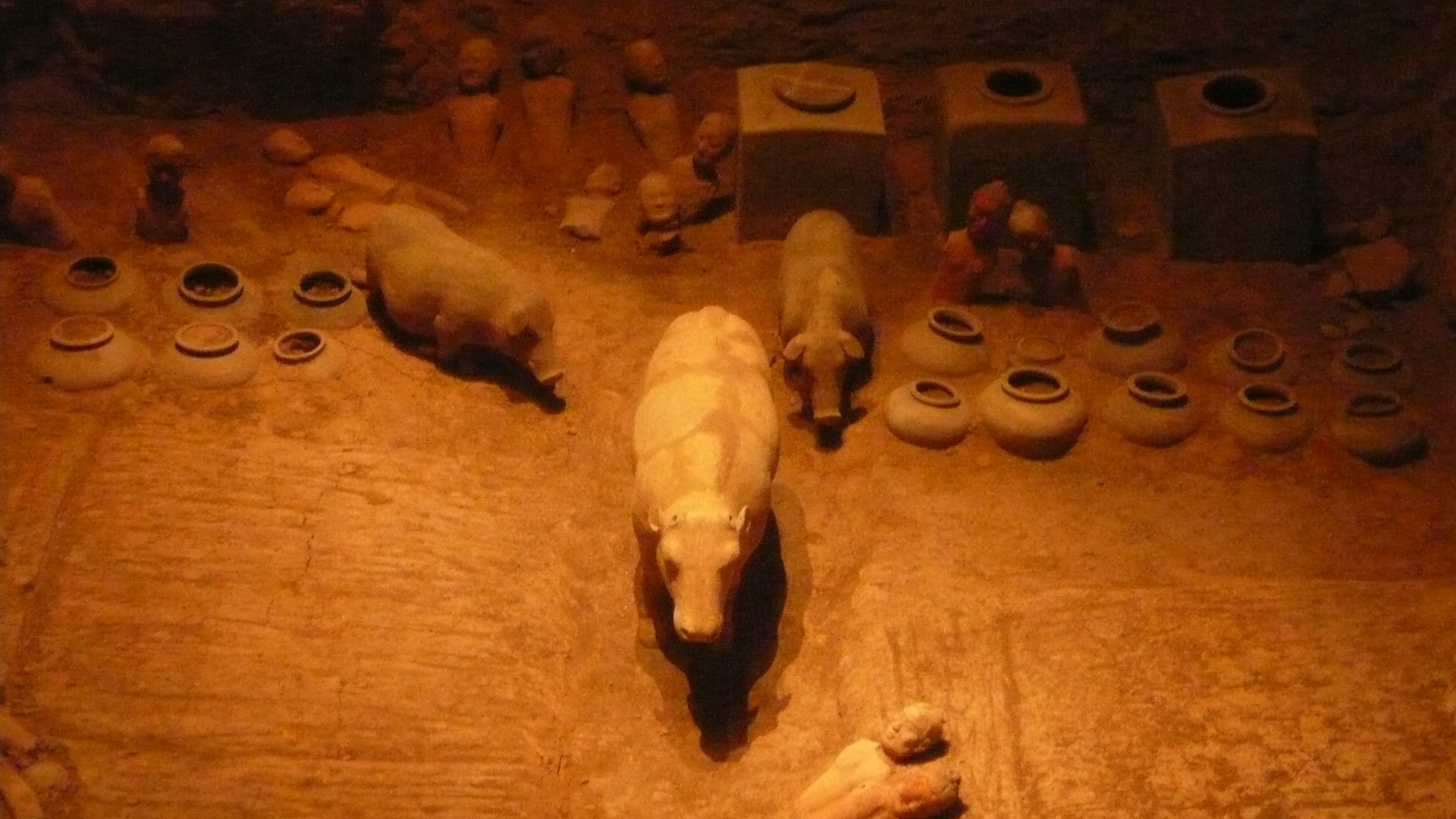
Tomb figures in the Yangling Mausoleum of Han at Xianyang, near Xi'an

== Late reign ==
The late reign of Emperor Jing was marked by an incident for which he was much criticized: the death of Zhou Yafu, who had been instrumental in the victory against the Seven States. As prime minister, Zhou offended nearly every powerful figure around Emperor Jing, in particular his brother Prince Liu Wu and his mother Empress Dowager Dou (for refusing to save Liang first when Liang was sieged by the combined forces of Wu and Chu), and his wife Empress Wang and her brother Wang Xin (王信), whom Emperor Jing wanted to make a marquess but whose candidacy Zhou rebuffed. By 143 BC, he was retired when his son, in anticipation of his death, purchased retired armor and weapons from the imperial armory to serve as burial decorations. Zhou's son refused to pay the delivery workers, and the delivery workers, in retaliation, accused the Zhous of treason. Emperor Jing had Zhou Yafu arrested and interrogated, and the interrogator, when told by Zhou that the armor and weapons were for burial purposes, accused him of "underground treason"—i.e., ready to commit treason against the spirits of the emperors after he himself dies. Zhou committed suicide in prison.

Emperor Jing died in 141 BC and was buried in the Han Yang Ling Mausoleum in Chang'an. He was succeeded by Crown Prince Che (as Emperor Wu).

== Legacy ==
His reign, along with that of his father Emperor Wen, known as the Rule of Wen and Jing, was considered to be one of the golden ages in Chinese history. However, it is also apparent from his actions that he lacked the warmth and openness his father had, and in many ways his reign was marked by political intrigue and treachery. This coldness applied to Jing's inner circle as well; it is said of his relationship with the palace guard Zhou Wenren that 'the emperor loved him more than most people, but not as much as other emperors loved their male favorites.'

Emperor Jing can also be credited for furthering the study of Taoist text after he recognized the Tao Te Ching as a Chinese classic during his rule.

In 2016, the discovery of the earliest tea traces known to date from the mausoleum of Emperor Jing in Xi'an was announced, indicating that tea was drunk by Han dynasty emperors as early as second century BC.

== Era names ==
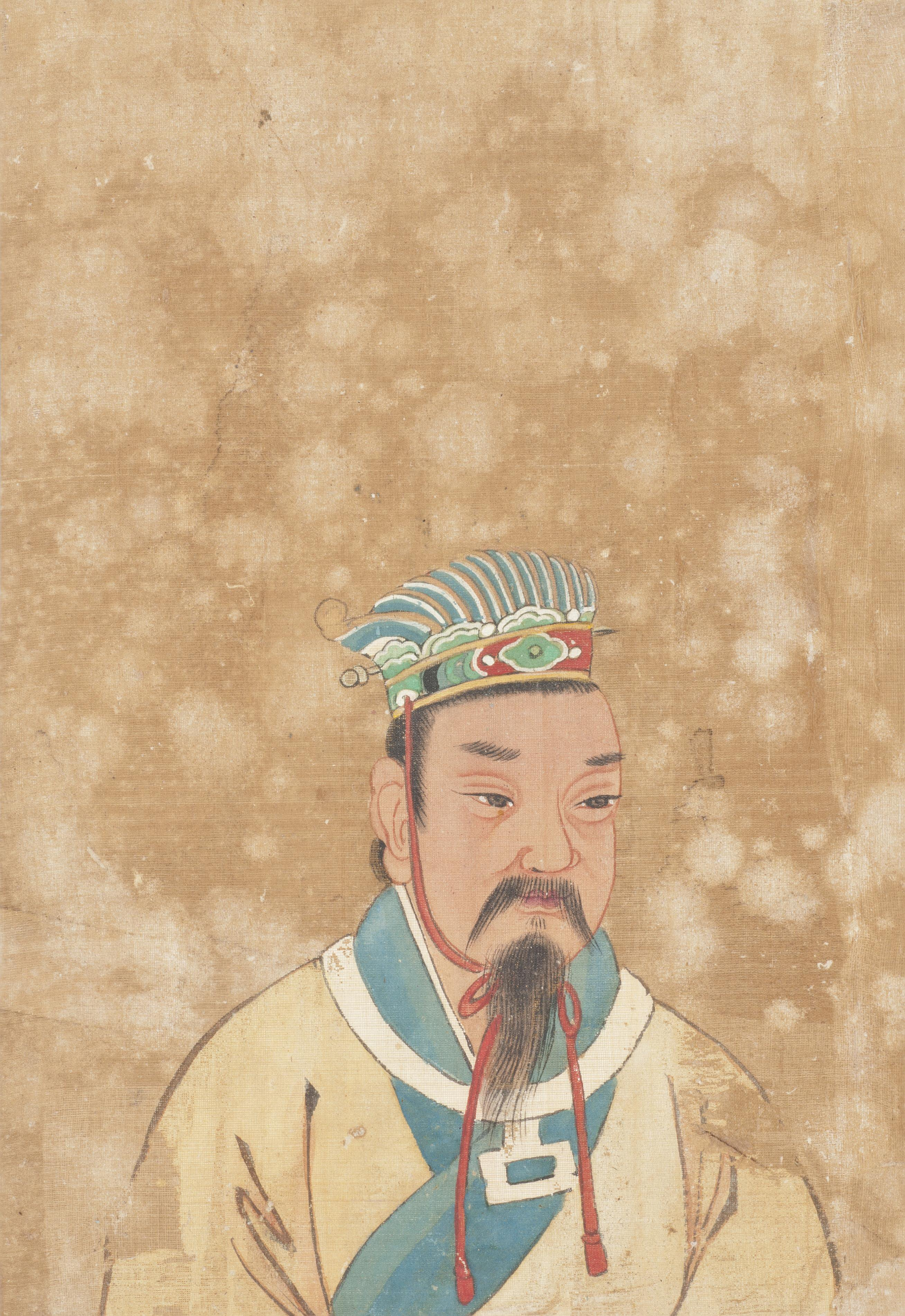
As depicted in Portraits of Famous Men, housed in the Philadelphia Museum of Art

These "era names" are not true "era names" in the sense that the era name system, as instituted by Emperor Jing's son Emperor Wu, had not come into place. Emperor Jing, in accordance to prior imperial calendaring systems, would have simply referred to the number of years in his reign, but for unknown reasons reset the count twice, thus requiring historians to refer to them separately.

- Qianyuan (前元, "Former Era") 156 BC – 150 BC
- Zhongyuan (中元, "Middle Era") 149 BC – 144 BC
- Houyuan (後元, "Later Era") 143 BC – 141 BC

== Family ==
- Empress, of the Bo clan (皇后 薄氏; d. 147 BC), second cousin
- Empress Xiaojing, of the Wang clan (孝景皇后 王氏; d. 126 BC), personal name Zhi (娡)
  - Grand Princess Yangxin (陽信長公主)
    - Married Cao Shi, Marquis Pingyang (曹時; d. 131 BC), and had issue (one son)
    - Married Xiahou Po, Marquis Ruyin (夏侯頗; d. 115 BC)
    - Married Wei Qing, Marquis Changping (d. 106 BC)
  - Princess Nangong (南宮公主)
    - Married Zhang Zuo, Marquis Nangong (張坐)
    - Married Er Shen (耏申) in 123 BC
  - Princess Longlü (隆慮公主)
    - Married Chen Jiao, Marquis Longlü (陳蟜; d. 116 BC), and had issue (one son)
  - Liu Che, Emperor Xiaowu (孝武皇帝 劉徹; 157–87 BC), tenth son
- Lady, of the Li clan (栗氏)
  - Liu Rong, Prince Min of Linjiang (臨江閔王 劉榮; 172–148 BC), first son
  - Liu De, Prince Xian of Hejian (河間獻王 劉德; 171–130 BC), second son
  - Liu Eyu, Prince Ai of Linjiang (臨江哀王 劉閼於; 170–154 BC), fourth son
- Lady, of the Cheng clan (程氏)
  - Liu Yu, Prince Gong of Lu (魯恭王 劉馀; d. 128 BC), third son
  - Liu Fei, Prince Yi of Jiangdu (江都易王 劉非; 168–128 BC), fifth son
  - Liu Duan, Prince Yu of Jiaoxi (膠西於王 劉端; 165–107 BC), seventh son
- Lady, of the Tang clan (唐氏)
  - Liu Fa, Prince Ding of Changsha (長沙定王 劉發; d. 129 BC), sixth son
- Furen, of the Jia clan (夫人 賈氏)
  - Liu Pengzu, Prince Jingsu of Zhao (趙敬肅王 劉彭祖; 166–92 BC), eighth son
  - Liu Sheng, Prince Jing of Zhongshan (中山靖王 劉勝; 165–113 BC), ninth son
- Furen, of the Wang clan (夫人 王氏), personal name Erxu (兒姁)
  - Liu Yue, Prince Hui of Guangchuan (廣川惠王 劉越; d. 135 BC), 11th son
  - Liu Ji, Prince Kang of Jiaodong (膠東康王 劉寄; d. 120 BC), 12th son
  - Liu Cheng, Prince Ai of Qinghe (清河哀王 劉乘; 153–135 BC), 13th son
  - Liu Shun, Prince Xian of Changshan (常山憲王 劉舜; 152–113 BC), 14th son

== See also ==
- Family tree of the Han dynasty
- Rebellion of the Seven States
- Rule of Wen and Jing

== Sources ==
- Book of Han, vol. 5.
- Zizhi Tongjian, vols. 15, 16.
- Barbieri-Low, Anthony J.; Yates, Robin D.S. (2015). Law, State, and Society in Early Imperial China. Sinica Leidensia. Vol. 1. Leiden: Brill Publishers. ISBN 978-90-04-30053-8.
- Sima Qian (1994) [c. 91 BC]. The Grand Scribe's Records. Vol. 2. Translated by W.H. Nienhauser; W. Cao; Scott W. Galer; W.H. Nienhauser; D.W. Pankenier. Indiana University Press. ISBN 978-0-253-34022-1.
- Vervoorn, Aat Emile (1990). "Chronology of Dynasties and Reign Periods". Men of the Cliffs and Caves: The Development of the Chinese Eremitic Tradition to the End of the Han Dynasty. Hong Kong: Chinese University Press. pp. 311–316. ISBN 978-962-201-415-2.

Emperor Jing of Han House of Liu Born: 188 BC Died: 141 BC
Regnal titles
Preceded by Emperor Wen of Han	Emperor of China; Western Han; 156–141 BC	Succeeded by Emperor Wu of Han
