= 120s BC =

Decade

This article concerns the period 129 BC – 120 BC.

== Events ==
=== 129 BC ===
==== By place ====
====== The Roman Republic ======
- The Kingdom of Pergamon becomes the Roman Province of Asia upon the defeat of Aristonicus, pretender to the Attalid throne, by M. Perperna.
- C. Sempronius Tuditanus celebrates his triumph over the Iapydes of Illyria.
- Scipio Aemilianus, victor of Carthage is possibly assassinated by his enemies in Rome.

====== Syria ======
- Battle of Ecbatana: the Seleucid King Antiochus VII Sidetes is defeated and killed by the Parthians under Phraates II, ending Seleucid control over Media or Mesopotamia.
- Having been freed by the Parthians, Demetrius II of Syria recovers the throne of the Seleucid Empire.

====== China ======
- March: Chen Jiao is deposed as Empress after she asks a sorceress to curse Emperor Wu's favourite consort, Wei Zifu, this being regarded an act of heresy and treason. Wei Zifu is made the new Empress.
- Spring: the Xiongnu raid Shanggu, killing officials and other inhabitants.
- Autumn: Emperor Wu launches his first offensive into the northern steppe against the Xiongnu and their allies. The invasion consists of four armies, each of 10,000 cavalrymen. Two of the four armies are defeated, namely those of Li Guang and Gongsun Ao, and only the army of Wei Qing achieves a victory. Although a modest success, Wei Qing's victory is the first Han success against the Xiongnu. Moreover, it is won at Longcheng, a sacred site far to the north, beyond the Gobi Desert, where the Xiongnu offer sacrifices.
- Winter: the Xiongnu retaliate by crossing the border several times, especially ravaging Yuyang.
- The Han diplomat Zhang Qian escapes Xiongnu custody and resumes his mission of forming an anti-Xiongnu alliance with the Yuezhi. He reaches the State of Dayuan in the Ferghana Valley, whose trade with the Han had been prevented by the Xiongnu and who supply Zhang with guides. Zhang then travels to the states of Kangju, Greater Yuezhi and Daxia (Bactria). He also learns of the Parthian Empire, Daqin, the Caspian Sea and the source of the Yellow River.

==== By topic ====
====== Astronomy ======
- Hipparchus publishes his catalog of stars.
- Total solar eclipse, used by Hipparchus to estimate distance to the Moon.

=== 128 BC ===
==== By place ====
====== Roman Republic ======
- Cn. Octavius and T. Annius Rufus are this year's consuls

====== Bactria ======
- The Greco-Bactrian kingdom is overrun by the Tokhari.

====== Parthia ======
- Artabanus II becomes king of Parthia (approximate date)

====== China ======
- In response to Han incursions, in 128 or 127 the Xiongnu invade northern China. They kill the governor of Liaoxi, defeat the governor of Yuyang, capture 2000 of the inhabitants of Liaoxi and Yuyang and defeat the Han general Han Anguo. Han Anguo and his cavalry force are surrounded in their camp but the arrival of relief forces coming from Yan causes the Xiongnu army to withdraw. The Xiongnu also invade Yanmen and kill or capture 1000 people.
- The Han general Wei Qing, with an army of 30,000 cavalrymen, defeats a Xiongnu army north of Yanmen. The Han general Li Xi attacks the Xiongnu further to the east, riding out of Dai Prefecture.
- Having spent a year in Greater Yuezhi, the Han diplomat Zhang Qian begins his return journey to China, having failed to persuade Yuezhi's king to form an alliance against the Xiongnu. Passing by the Pamir, Kunlun, Altun and Qilian Mountains, he and his retinue are then captured by the Xiongnu and taken into custody.

==== By topic ====
====== Arts and sciences ======
- Limenius composes the Second Delphic Hymn.

=== 127 BC ===
==== By place ====
====== Parthia ======
- The Scythians defeat the Parthians in a battle around Media.

====== China ======
- January: Emperor Wu of Han begins a policy of pressuring the client kings of the Han dynasty into dividing their kingdoms. Previously, only the eldest son would inherit a kingdom. However, in an edict, Wu permits the kings of Liang and Chengyang to divide the land of their states and distribute the land to their younger brothers. Wu grants these brothers titles and promises to do the same if other kings grant land to younger brothers and younger sons. This precedent pressures other kings to do likewise, and Wu places the younger brothers and younger sons under the jurisdiction of the imperial prefectures.
- Wei Qing defeats a Xiongnu army near Gaoque. He then invades the Ordos Plateau, defeats the Xiongnu and their Baiyang and Loufan allies in the battles of Puni and Fuli, and then defeats the main Xiongnu force. The conquered territory becomes Shuofang Commandery. Wu orders the foundation of Shuofang City, and the system of defenses that had been built by the Qin dynasty general Meng Tian are repaired.
- The Han rationalize the northern frontier, abandoning the remote region of Zaoyang to the Xiongnu.

=== 126 BC ===
==== By place ====
====== Syria ======
- Tyre successfully revolts from the Seleucid Empire.
- Seleucus V Philometor succeeds his father Demetrius II as king of the Seleucid Empire. Due to his youth, his stepmother Cleopatra Thea acts as regent.

====== Xiongnu ======
- Winter 127/6: The Xiongnu ruler Junchen Chanyu dies, and his younger brother Yizhixie, the Luli King of the Left (East), overthrows Junchen's son Yudan and sets himself up as the new Chanyu. Yudan flees to the Han and dies a few months later.

====== China ======
- Summer: In retaliation for the Han conquest of the Ordos Plateau in the previous year, the Xiongnu invade the province of Dai, kill its governor, Gong You, and capture over 1000 of its inhabitants.
- Autumn: The Xiongnu cross into Yanmen and kill or capture over 1000 of the inhabitants.
- Having used the Xiongnu civil war to escape his imprisonment, the diplomat Zhang Qian returns to China and reports on the lands to the west.
- To avoid the Xiongnu and Qiang of the north-west and west respectively, Emperor Wu begins a policy of exploring a possible route of contact with Daxia (Bactria) via India, sending envoys to establish diplomatic relations with and movement through the Dian Kingdom. Wu wishes to receive the submission of Daxia and other states in western Eurasia.

=== 125 BC ===
==== By place ====
====== Syria ======
- Cleopatra Thea succeeds to the rule of the Seleucid Empire on the death of Seleucus V. She appoints Antiochus VIII Grypus as co-ruler.

====== Roman Republic ======
- In Rome, Marcus Fulvius Flaccus proposes the extension of Roman citizenship to the northern Italians, but the Senate reacts by sending him off to deal with disturbances around Massilia. And in so doing, commences the conquest of Transalpine Gaul.
- Completion of Aqua Tepula aqueduct in Rome.

====== China ======
- In retaliation for the Han conquest of the Ordos Plateau two years prior, three Xiongnu forces raid the Prefectures of Dai, Dingxiang and Shang.
- The Xiongnu Tuqi (Worthy Prince) of the Right (West), especially angry at the loss of the Ordos Plateau, invades the region and kills or carries off a large number of officials and other inhabitants.

=== 124 BC ===
==== By place ====
====== Roman Republic ======
- Fregellae's revolt against Rome begins in Latium. Later the city is captured and destroyed by the Romans.

====== Parthia ======
- Mithridates II succeeds Artabanus II as King of Parthia.

====== Egypt ======
- Cleopatra II of Egypt and her brother Ptolemy VIII of Egypt reconcile.

====== China ======
- Spring: The Han general Wei Qing, with an army of 30,000 cavalry, proceeds from Gaoque into Xiongnu territory, and in a night attack surrounds the Tuqi King of the Right in his camp. The Tuqi escapes, but numerous petty chiefs are captured in this and a second engagement.
- Li Xi and Zhang Cigong invade Xiongnu territory from Youbeiping Prefecture but encounter no enemy forces.
- Emperor Wu of Han rewards Wei Qing by making him General-in-Chief.
- Autumn: The Xiongnu retaliate by invading the Prefecture of Dai, where they kill its chief commandant, Zhu Ying.

=== 123 BC ===
==== By place ====
====== Roman Republic ======
- Gaius Gracchus elected Roman tribune for the first time. He waits until after his re-election the following year before pushing forward the various civil and agrarian reforms that his brother championed in 133 BC.
- Aix-en-Provence founded under the name of Aquae Sextiae by the Roman consul Sextius Calvinus.
- Quintus Caecilius Metellus conquers the Balearic Islands for Rome, for which he earns the agnomen "Balearicus." He settles 3,000 Roman and Iberian colonists on the islands and founds the cities of Palma and Pollentia.

====== China ======
- Spring: The Han General-in-Chief Wei Qing launches two invasions of Xiongnu territory from Dingxiang, defeating two Xiongnu armies and killing or capturing several thousand of the enemy.

- During the second expedition, the force under Su Jian and Zhao Xin is surrounded and almost entirely destroyed by the army of Yizhixie Chanyu. Zhao Xin defects to the Chanyu.
- For these two campaigns, Emperor Wu of Han orders Wei Qing to make his eighteen-year-old nephew Huo Qubing the commander of a force of 800 cavalry. Raiding deep into enemy territory, Huo's force kills or captures a Xiongnu Prime Minister and a Household Administrator, kills the Marquis of Jiruo (an elder relative of Yizhixie Chanyu), and captures the Chanyu's uncle Luogubi.

- A conspiracy led by Liu An, king of Huainan, is discovered. Liu An commits suicide, and his queen and crown prince are executed. Huainan becomes Jiujiang Prefecture.

=== 122 BC ===
==== By place ====
====== Roman Republic ======
- Marcus Fulvius Flaccus and Gaius Gracchus become tribunes and propose a number of radical reforms in Rome.
- Gracchus passes a law requiring the state to provide weapons and equipment for the soldiers in the Roman army.

====== China ======
- Emperor Wu of Han appoints Liu Ju, his son by Empress Wei Zifu, as Crown Prince.

=== 121 BC ===
==== By place ====
====== Carians ======
- Kingdom of the Carians colonize eastern part of the ancient region the Yemen,and created the cities of Mylasa and Cnidus.

====== Phrygians ======
- Kingdom of the Phrygians after founding the city of Mydas in the current Cartagena in Colombia,enter deeper into the current region of Villavicenzo,in the state of Meta and created the city of Acmonia.

====== Roman Republic ======
- The Roman Senate passes the motion senatus consultum ultimum, which the consul Lucius Opimius interprets as giving him unlimited power to preserve the Republic. He gathers an armed force of Senators and their supporters to confront Gaius Gracchus. A pitched battle is fought inside Rome, resulting in the death of Gracchus and many of his followers.
- A tribunal is established in Rome that executes 3,000 followers of Gracchus.
- Consul Quintus Fabius Maximus, allied with the Aedui, defeats the Arverni and Allobroges in Transalpine Gaul, thus establishing the province for Rome.
- The finest vintage of Falernian wine, known as the Opimian vintage, is bottled from vines grown on Mt Falernus between Latium and Campania.

====== China ======
- Spring - The Han general Huo Qubing attacks the Supu, vassals of the Xiongnu, and kills their king. He then invades the Hexi Corridor, where he fights a six-day running battle against a son of Yizhixie Chanyu. The Xiongnu are defeated, and the ruler of Lan and king Lu, both vassals of the Xiongnu, are killed in the fighting. Huo Qubing then attacks and defeats the Hunye, capturing the son of the Hunye king and his ministers and chief commandants.
- Summer - Huo Qubing again invades the Hexi Corridor. In an engagement in the Qilian Mountains, he captures the king of the Qiutu. In a second engagement, he then captures five vassal kings of the Xiongnu and a consort of the Chanyu, killing or capturing more than 30,000 Xiongnu soldiers.
- Generals Li Guang and Zhang Qian ride north from Youbeiping, but Zhang Qian, with the larger army, is slow to rendezvous with Li Guang. As a result, Li Guang loses more than half his army in battle against the Tuqi (Worthy Prince) of the Left (East).
- Autumn - Yizhixie Chanyu plans on executing the Hunye and Xiutu kings for their failures against Huo Qubing, but learning of this, the vassal kings inform the Han of their intention to surrender. Emperor Wu of Han sends Huo Qubing across the Yellow River with an army to oversee their surrender. Some of the enemy troops and leaders then refuse to surrender, but Huo Qubing massacres 8000 of them as they attempt to flee. Huo Qubing receives the surrender of thirty-two Xiongnu vassals, and the Hunye king and other vassals are enfeoffed as marquises in China.
- The rapid conquest of the Hexi Corridor provides the traditional western provinces of China with greater security. As a result, Emperor Wu halves the number of soldiers garrisoning the provinces of Longxi, Beidi and Shang.

=== 120 BC ===
==== By place ====
====== Europe ======
- The Teutons and the Cimbri migrate south and west to the Danube valley where they encounter the expanding Roman Republic (approximate date).

====== China ======
- Retaliating against the Han conquest of the Hexi Corridor in the previous year, the Xiongnu invade the provinces of Youbeiping and Dingxiang, killing or capturing over 1000 inhabitants.

== Births ==
128 BC

- Liu Ju, Chinese prince of the Han dynasty (d. 91 BC)

125 BC

- Quintus Sertorius, Roman statesman and general (d. 73 BC)

121 BC

- Publius Sulpicius Rufus, Roman statesman (d. 88 BC)
- Quintus Sertorius, Roman general (d. 72 BC)

120 BC

- May 21 – Aurelia Cotta, mother of Julius Caesar (d. 54 BC)
- Berenice III, reigning Queen of Egypt (d. 80 BC)
- Lucius Cornelius Sisenna, writer and politician (d. 67 BC)
- Verres, corrupt praetor (approximate date) (d. 43 BC)

== Deaths ==
129 BC

- Antiochus VII Sidetes (killed in battle)
- Carneades, philosopher, and founder of Third Academy (b. c. 214 BC)
- P. Cornelius Scipio Aemilianus Africanus Numantinus (Africanus the Younger) (b. 185 BC)

128 BC

- Liu Fei, Chinese prince of the Han dynasty (b. 169 BC)
- Phraates II, king of Parthia (approximate date)

127 BC

- Nicomedes II (Epiphanes), king of Bithynia
- Zhufu Yan, Chinese politician and official of the Han dynasty (or 126 BC)

126 BC

- Phraates II, king of the Parthian Empire
- Wang Zhi, Chinese empress of the Han dynasty (b. 173 BC)

125 BC

- Demetrius II, king of the Seleucid Empire
- Seleucus V Philometor (killed by Cleopatra Thea)

124 BC

- Artabanus II of Parthia

123 BC

- Alexander II Zabinas, king of the Seleucid Empire

122 BC

- Liu An, Chinese prince, geographer, and cartographer (b. 179 BC)

121 BC

- Cleopatra Thea, Seleucid queen
- Gaius Gracchus, Roman politician (b. 154 BC)
- Marcus Fulvius Flaccus, Roman consul

120 BC

- Hipparchus, Greek astronomer and mathematician, on Rhodes (approximate date) (b. c. 190 BC)
