= 139 BC =

139 BC in various calendars
- Gregorian calendar: 139 BC; CXXXIX BC
- Ab urbe condita: 615
- Ancient Egypt era: XXXIII dynasty, 185
- Pharaoh: Ptolemy VIII Physcon, 7
- Ancient Greek Olympiad (summer): 160th Olympiad, year 2
- Assyrian calendar: 4612
- Balinese saka calendar: N/A
- Bengali calendar: −732 – −731
- Berber calendar: 812
- Buddhist calendar: 406
- Burmese calendar: −776
- Byzantine calendar: 5370–5371
- Chinese calendar: 辛丑年 (Metal Ox); 2559 or 2352 — to — 壬寅年 (Water Tiger); 2560 or 2353
- Coptic calendar: −422 – −421
- Discordian calendar: 1028
- Ethiopian calendar: −146 – −145
- Hebrew calendar: 3622–3623
- Hindu calendars
- Vikram Samvat: −82 – −81
- Shaka Samvat: N/A
- Kali Yuga: 2962–2963
- Holocene calendar: 9862
- Iranian calendar: 760 BP – 759 BP
- Islamic calendar: 783 BH – 782 BH
- Javanese calendar: N/A
- Julian calendar: N/A
- Korean calendar: 2195
- Minguo calendar: 2050 before ROC 民前2050年
- Nanakshahi calendar: −1606
- Seleucid era: 173/174 AG
- Thai solar calendar: 404–405
- Tibetan calendar: ལྕགས་མོ་གླང་ལོ་ (female Iron-Ox) −12 or −393 or −1165 — to — ཆུ་ཕོ་སྟག་ལོ་ (male Water-Tiger) −11 or −392 or −1164

Year 139 BC was a year of the pre-Julian Roman calendar. At the time it was known as the Year of the Consulship of Piso and Laenas (or, less frequently, year 615 Ab urbe condita) and the Second Year of Jianyuan. The denomination 139 BC for this year has been used since the early medieval period, when the Anno Domini calendar era became the prevalent method in Europe for naming years.

== Events ==
=== By place ===
==== China ====
- Emperor Wu of Han sends the diplomat Zhang Qian west to form an alliance with the Yuezhi against the Xiongnu. Wu does this after learning from Xiongnu defectors that the Xiongnu had defeated and killed the king of the Yuezhi, had expelled the Yuezhi from their lands and were using their king's skull as a wine goblet. The Yuezhi had subsequently migrated further west.
- Soon after his departure for the west, Zhang Qian is detained by Junchen Chanyu of the Xiongnu. He would remain in Xiongnu custody for more than ten years and would be given a Xiongnu wife.
- Wei Zifu enters Emperor Wu's palace as a concubine and becomes pregnant. Enraged, Liu Piao, the mother of the childless Empress Chen Jiao (wife of Emperor Wu), kidnaps Zifu's brother Wei Qing, who is rescued by Gongsun Ao. Wu responds by advancing the careers of members of the Wei family.

==== Roman Republic ====
- The Lusitanian War ends when the rebellion collapses after the assassination of Viriathus by a Roman agent.
- The Achaean League is reestablished.

=== By topic ===
==== Astronomy ====
- Hipparchus makes a very precise determination of the length of the synodic month.

== Deaths ==
- Viriathus, Lusitanian leader (assassinated)
