= Dongfang Shuo (TV series) =

- Chinese: 东方朔
- Hanyu Pinyin: Dōngfāng Shuò
- Genre: Historical, biographical
- Based on: Wisdom Holy Dongfang Shuo by Dongfang Longyin
- Written by: Tan Li
- Directed by: Yan Xiaozhui
- Starring: Cheng Qian; Jin Dong; Hu Ke; Qin Hailu; Yu Xiaowei; Liu Xiyuan; Hu Yajie; Tao Huimin; Zhang Lingxin
- Opening theme: "Eastern has a Dongfang Shuo"
- Ending theme: "Best in the World"
- Country of origin: China
- Original language: Mandarin
- No. of seasons: 1
- No. of episodes: 45

Production
- Executive producer: Li Peisen
- Production location: Zhuzhou
- Cinematography: Shen Xinghao
- Production companies: China Central Television; Beijing Film Academy; Guangdong Donghexing Recording and Video Company

Original release
- Network: CCTV-8
- Release: August 17 – September 7, 2008

Dongfang Shuo (Chinese: 东方朔) is a 2008 Chinese historical and biographical television series centered on Dongfang Shuo, a Han dynasty scholar-official, fangshi ("master of esoterica"), author, and court jester to Emperor Wu (r. 141–87 BCE). It is based on the novel Wisdom Holy Dongfang Shuo by Dongfang Longyin. The series was jointly by China Central Television, Beijing Film Academy and Guangdong Donghexing Recording and Video Company. The series stars Cheng Qian as Dongfang Shuo, the rest of the main cast includes Jin Dong, Hu Ke, Qin Hailu, Yu Xiaowei, Liu Xiyuan, Hu Yajie, Tao Huimin, and Zhang Lingxin. It originally aired on CCTV-8 in August 2008.

== Synopsis ==
This is the story of Dongfang Shuo, a Han dynasty scholar and court jester to Emperor Wu of Han.

Dongfang Shuo was different from the other scholars and officials in the reign of Emperor Wu. He even fell in love with a prostitute named Luo Qi and a royal named Princess Pingyang. Because of his uniqueness, his advice wasn't accepted and his rank stayed the same. However, the Emperor never punished Dongfang Shuo and instead allowed Dongfang Shuo by his side. Dongfang Shuo was clever, and helped resolve conflicts in the Emperor's harem (Chen Jiao and Wei Zifu), changed Heqin methods, and advised the Emperor on how to defeat the Xiongnu. Yet, the Emperor's arrogance would let his empire suffer. The Xiongnu were victorious in several battles, and the young general Huo Qubing dies in battle. Dongfang Shuo realized that the Emperor will never listen to his advice, and eventually left his side.

== Cast ==
=== Main ===
- Cheng Qian as Dongfang Shuo
- Jin Dong as Emperor Wu
- Hu Ke as Princess Pingyang
- Qin Hailu as Luo Qi
- Yu Xiaowei as Wei Qing
- Bao Bei'er as Huo Qubing
- Liu Xiyuan as Liu Nan
- Hu Yajie as Qiankunzi
- Tao Huimin as Empress Dowager Wang
- Zhang Lingxin as Empress Chen Jiao
- Liu Jingjing as Wei Zifu

=== Supporting ===
- Ni Tu as Dou Wangsun
- Han Jingru as Empress Dowager Dou
- Wang Yunsheng as Sima Qian
- He Shengwei as Gan Fu
- Wang Lan as Aunt Qiu
- Ren Tianye as Jing Kui
- Ma Wenzhong as Wang Pi
- Yu Tong as Wang Huai'e
- Xie Ning as Qiu Hu
- Ba Ning as Yang Deyi
- He Tao as Zhang Tang
- Cai Hongxiang as Ming Fei
- Wang Tong as Li Shaojun
- Wang Yonggui as Gongsun Hong
- Tian Erxi as Gong Yang
- Li Li as Lvy Yu
- Zhang Xingzhe as Dou Wei
- Chen Hai as Dou Yong
- Wu Xu as Dou Meng
- Cui Zhigang as Li Cai
- Shi Wenjia as Liu Hao
- Zhang Yi as Gan Qi
- Liu Zhengyu as Li Weihu
- Liu Jing as Lian'er
- Guo Wenxue as Jin Buhuan
- Li Jiang as Yi Sheng

== Music ==
No.	Title	Singers	Length
1.	"Eastern has a Dongfang Shuo (东方有个东方朔)" (Opening theme)	Tengger
2.	"Best in the World (天下第一)" (Ending theme)	Gu Liya and Shi Peng

== Production ==
Jin Dong, who won a Huabiao Award nomination for his performance in Autumn Rain last year, was cast as Emperor Wu. Qin Hailu, a Golden Horse Award for Best Actress winner, signed on to star as Luo Qi, a prostitute who has a mixed feelings with Dongfang Shuo in the drama. Yu Xiaowei, acclaimed for his performance in The Promise, joined the cast as General Wei Qing.

The series was shot on location in Zhuzhou.
