= 106 BC =

106 BC in various calendars
Gregorian calendar	106 BC; CVI BC
Ab urbe condita	648
Ancient Egypt era	XXXIII dynasty, 218
Pharaoh	Ptolemy X Alexander, 2
Ancient Greek Olympiad (summer)	168th Olympiad, year 3
Assyrian calendar	4645
Balinese saka calendar	N/A
Bengali calendar	−699 – −698
Berber calendar	845
Buddhist calendar	439
Burmese calendar	−743
Byzantine calendar	5403–5404
Chinese calendar	甲戌年 (Wood Dog); 2592 or 2385 — to — 乙亥年 (Wood Pig); 2593 or 2386
Coptic calendar	−389 – −388
Discordian calendar	1061
Ethiopian calendar	−113 – −112
Hebrew calendar	3655–3656
- Hindu calendars
Vikram Samvat	−49 – −48
Shaka Samvat	N/A
Kali Yuga	2995–2996
Holocene calendar	9895
Iranian calendar	727 BP – 726 BP
Islamic calendar	749 BH – 748 BH
Javanese calendar	N/A
Julian calendar	N/A
Korean calendar	2228
Minguo calendar	2017 before ROC 民前2017年
Nanakshahi calendar	−1573
Seleucid era	206/207 AG
Thai solar calendar	437–438
Tibetan calendar	ཤིང་ཕོ་ཁྱི་ལོ་ (male Wood-Dog); 21 or −360 or −1132 — to — ཤིང་མོ་ཕག་ལོ་ (female Wood-Boar); 22 or −359 or −1131

Year 106 BC was a year of the pre-Julian Roman calendar. At the time it was known as the Year of the Consulship of Caepio and Serranus (or, less frequently, year 648 Ab urbe condita) and the Fifth Year of Yuanfeng. The denomination 106 BC for this year has been used since the early medieval period, when the Anno Domini calendar era became the prevalent method in Europe for naming years.

== Events ==
=== By place ===
==== Roman Republic ====
- The Romans under Quintus Servilius Caepio seize the Gold of Tolosa while recapturing the Volcae town.

==== Anatolia ====
- Nicomedes III of Bithynia and Mithridates VI of Pontus share their dominion over Paphlagonia.

==== China ====
- Following the death of General-in-Chief Wei Qing, his sister Empress Wei Zifu and nephew Crown Prince Liu Ju begin to lose influence at court.

== Births ==
- January 3 – Cicero, Roman politician and author (d. 43 BC)
- September 29 – Pompey the Great, Roman general and politician (d. 48 BC)
- Servius Sulpicius Rufus, Roman politician (d. 43 BC)

== Deaths ==
- Wei Qing, Chinese general of the Han dynasty
