= The Prince of Han Dynasty =

- DVD cover art for Season 1
- Traditional Chinese: 大漢天子
- Simplified Chinese: 大汉天子
- Literal meaning: Son of Heaven of the Great Han
- Hanyu Pinyin: Dà Hàn Tiānzǐ
- Genre: Historical fiction
- Written by: Yang Xiaoxiong
- Directed by: Season 1: Liang Benxi; Gao Yijun; Season 2: Dong Li; Season 3: Fan Xiuming
- Creative director: Stanley Kwan
- Presented by: Shi Xue; Shi Jingguo
- Starring: Huang Xiaoming
- Opening theme: Shouye Gengbi Chuangye Nan(守业更比创业难) performed by Jing Gangshan
- Ending theme: Wangle Wo (忘了我) performed by Huang Gexuan / Chu Rui
- Country of origin: China
- Original language: Mandarin
- No. of seasons: 3
- No. of episodes: 41 (Season 1); 40 (Season 2); 48 (Season 3)

Production
- Producer: Zhou Min
- Production location: China
- Running time: 45 minutes per episode
- Production companies: Baoshi Film Investment; China Great Wall Arts and Culture Centre

The Prince of Han Dynasty is a three-season Chinese television series featuring a fictionalised life story of Liu Che, Emperor Wu of the Han dynasty. Season 1 was first broadcast on Beijing Television in 2001 in mainland China, followed by the second and third seasons in 2003 and 2005 respectively. Except for Huang Xiaoming, who played Emperor Wu in all three seasons, the cast members in each season are almost different from its preceding one.

== Titles ==
The Chinese titles for each season are as follows:

- Season 1: 大汉天子 (The Prince of Han Dynasty)
- Season 2: 大汉天子第二部:汉武雄风 (The Prince of Han Dynasty Part 2: The Majesty of Emperor Wu of Han)
- Season 3: 大汉天子第三部:铁血汗青 (The Prince of Han Dynasty Part 3: Iron Blood and the Pages of History)

== Cast ==
=== Season 1 ===
- Huang Xiaoming as Liu Che
- Chen Daoming as Dongfang Shuo
- Alyssa Chia as Niannujiao
- Sally Chen as Empress Dowager Dou
- Wang Ling as Wei Zifu
- Chen Zihan as Princess Pingyang
- He Jiayi as Chen Jiao
- Liu Guanxiang as Li Ling
- Liu Yijun as Qiuchan
- Zhang Mingjian as Zhang Tang
- Sun Feihu as Liu An
- Shang Rong as Liu Ling
- Xiu Zongdi as Marquis
- Zhou Zheng as Sima Tan
- Song Xiaochuan as Dou Ying
- Yi Yang as Sima Xiangru
- Jia Hongwei as Guan Fu
- Liu Xiaoxiao as Guo Deren
- Sun Hao as Cao Shou
- Li Daxin as Liu Yi
- Zhang Han as Lei Bei
- Yao Gang as Liu Wu
- Lu Yi as Dong Yan
- Li Wei as Guo Mama
- Song Daguang as Wei Qing
- Ma Jie as Tingwei
- Xu Liang as Huo Qubing
- Sun Jiaolong as Dou Wei
- Xu Lin as Empress Wang Zhi
- Jin Tian as Princess Guantao
- Zhao Zhengyang as Zhang Qian
- Qiao Jie as Li Gan
- Li Shengyu as Sima Qian
- Peng Bo as Zhuo Wenjun
- Sun Wanqing as Emperor Jing of Han
- Zhao Dongbo as Mysterious man
- Chi Guodong as Li Guang
- Hao Yang as Zhang Tang's wife
- Ya Bing as Yanzhi
- Chang Hong as Laobao

=== Season 2 ===
- Huang Xiaoming as Emperor Wu of Han
- Ning Jing as Empress Wei Zifu
- He Jiayi as Li Wa / Empress Chen Jiao
- Dong Yong as Wei Qing
- Wang Gang as Zhu Fuyan
- Du Chun as Li Ling
- Liu Yun as Qiuchan
- Li Li as Huo Qubing
- Liu Xiaohu as Ji Anshi
- Yang Hongwu as Ji An
- Zhao Xiaorui as King of Hunxie
- Hu Guangzi as Li Guangli
- Guan Shaozeng as Tian Fen
- Zhu Yana as Yanshi Malan

=== Season 3 ===
- Huang Xiaoming as Emperor Wu of Han
- Ruping as Empress Wei Zifu
- Sun Haiying as Jiang Chong
- Li Fei as Qiuchan
- Gao Hao as Li Han
- Wu Qianqian as Empress Dowager Wang
- Zhao Yiyang as Liu Ju
- Bo Yan'an as Zhao Nizi
- An Yixuan as Huo Qilian
- Xiong Naijin as Princess Weichang
- Liu Guanlin as Ji Qinhu
- Dong Yong as Wei Qing
- Zhou Ying as Liu Xijun
- Chen Lili as Ziwei
- Norman Chui as King of Yelang
