= 91 BC =

91 BC in various calendars
- Gregorian calendar: 91 BC; XCI BC
- Ab urbe condita: 663
- Ancient Egypt era: XXXIII dynasty, 233
- Pharaoh: Ptolemy X Alexander, 17
- Ancient Greek Olympiad (summer): 172nd Olympiad, year 2
- Assyrian calendar: 4660
- Balinese saka calendar: N/A
- Bengali calendar: −684 – −683
- Berber calendar: 860
- Buddhist calendar: 454
- Burmese calendar: −728
- Byzantine calendar: 5418–5419
- Chinese calendar: 己丑年 (Earth Ox); 2607 or 2400 — to — 庚寅年 (Metal Tiger); 2608 or 2401
- Coptic calendar: −374 – −373
- Discordian calendar: 1076
- Ethiopian calendar: −98 – −97
- Hebrew calendar: 3670–3671
- Hindu calendars
- Vikram Samvat: −34 – −33
- Shaka Samvat: N/A
- Kali Yuga: 3010–3011
- Holocene calendar: 9910
- Iranian calendar: 712 BP – 711 BP
- Islamic calendar: 734 BH – 733 BH
- Javanese calendar: N/A
- Julian calendar: N/A
- Korean calendar: 2243
- Minguo calendar: 2002 before ROC 民前2002年
- Nanakshahi calendar: −1558
- Seleucid era: 221/222 AG
- Thai solar calendar: 452–453
- Tibetan calendar: ས་མོ་གླང་ལོ་ (female Earth-Ox); 36 or −345 or −1117 — to — ལྕགས་ཕོ་སྟག་ལོ་ (male Iron-Tiger); 37 or −344 or −1116

Year 91 BC was a year of the pre-Julian Roman calendar. At the time it was known as the Year of the Consulship of Philippus and Caesar (or, less frequently, year 663 Ab urbe condita) and the Second Year of Zhenghe. The denomination 91 BC for this year has been used since the early medieval period, when the Anno Domini calendar era became the prevalent method in Europe for naming years.

== Events ==
=== By place ===
==== Roman Republic ====
- Consuls: Sextus Julius Caesar and Lucius Marcius Philippus.
- The tribune Marcus Livius Drusus proposes extending Roman citizenship to allied Italian cities, but is assassinated, leading to the Social War.

==== China ====
- Witchcraft Trials

- Emperor Wu of Han executes Prime Minister Gongsun He (the brother-in-law of Empress Wei Zifu) and his clan because Gongsun's son is accused of adultery with the emperor's daughter Princess Yangshi and witchcraft.
- Following further accusations of witchcraft, the emperor executes hundreds of imperial officials and concubines.
- After convincing the emperor that his ill health is caused by witchcraft, the prosecutor Jiang Chong is given charge of investigating the matter. People accuse each other of witchcraft, and tens of thousands are executed across China, including former generals Zhao Ponu and Gongsun Ao.

- 'Rebellion' of Liu Ju

- July - After Jiang Chong frames Crown Prince Liu Ju of witchcraft and prevents communication between the prince and his father, Liu Ju kills Jiang, former general Han Yue and their followers. Due to miscommunication, the emperor misinterprets this as a rebellion against himself, and he orders Prime Minister Liu Qumao to march against Liu Ju.
- After being defeated in Chang'an, Liu Ju and his mother, Empress Wei Zifu, commit suicide. Emperor Wu exterminates the followers of Liu Ju and their families.
- Learning that the charges against Liu Ju were fabricated, Emperor Wu orders further executions.

- September - The Xiongnu invade the prefectures of Shanggu and Wuyuan.

== Births ==
- Xuan of Han, emperor of the Han dynasty (d. 49 BC)

== Deaths ==
- Liu Ju, crown prince of the Han dynasty (b. 128 BC)
- Lucius Licinius Crassus, Roman consul (b. 140 BC)
- Marcus Livius Drusus, Roman politician
- Quintus Caecilius Metellus Numidicus, Roman politician
- Wei Zifu, empress of the Han dynasty
