= Wèi (surname Wey) =

Chinese surname

Wèi (simplified Chinese: 卫; traditional Chinese: 衛; pinyin: Wèi) is a Chinese surname. It means ‘defend, guard’ and is written Wai in Cantonese. The character 衞 is traditionally preferred although 衛 is now more prevalent, with 卫 being the simplified form in Mainland China. In 2013 it was found to be the 214th most common surname, shared by 480,000 people or 0.036% of the population, with the province with the most being Shanxi.

== Origins ==
- from Wei (衛), also known as "Wey" (to distinguish it from Wei 魏) the name of a state in modern-day Henan province granted to Wei Kang Shu (Chinese: 衛康叔; lit. 'The Younger Brother of Wei and Kang'), the 9th son of King Wen of Zhou. After Wei was annexed by the Qin during the Spring and Autumn period, Wei was adopted as the surname by the state's former subjects.
- associated with the Wei (衛) family from the Xianbei ethnic group

During the Zhou dynasty, Wey (衛) ruler Wei Yang (衛鞅)'s family name was Gongsun (公孫), not Wéi family (衛). During the Han dynasty, Wei Man (衛滿) was baron of Yan (state). During the Northern Wei (北魏), Xiaowen family got the surname Wei with state name. It is 12th on the Hundred Family Surnames poem.

== Notable people ==
- Wei Zifu (simplified Chinese: 卫子夫; traditional Chinese: 衛子夫; pinyin: Weì Zǐfū; Wade–Giles: Wei Tzu-fu; died 91 BC), posthumously known as Empress Xiaowu
- Wei Qing (衛青), general of the Western Han dynasty, brother of Wei Zifu
- Wei Shuo (衛鑠;272–349), courtesy name Mouyi (茂猗), sobriquet He'nan (和南), commonly addressed
- Wei Lihuang (traditional Chinese: 衛立煌; simplified Chinese: 卫立煌; pinyin: Wèi Lìhuáng) (16 February 1897 – 17 January 1960) was a Chinese general who served
- Zhang Wei (張衛), younger brother of the Eastern Han dynasty warlord Zhang Lu
- Wei Guan period. Wei Guan was from Anyi County (安邑縣), Hedong Commandery (河東郡), which is located west of present-day Xia County, Shanxi. His father Wei Ji (衛覬) was
- Wei Pu (Chinese: 衛朴; Wade–Giles: Wei P'u) was a Chinese astronomer and politician of the Song dynasty (960–1279 AD). He was born a commoner, but eventually
- Wei Rugui (Chinese: 衛汝貴; Wade–Giles: Wei Ju-kui; 1836 – 16 January 1895) was a Han Chinese general of the late Qing dynasty who fought in the First Sino-Japanese
- Wei Chunhua (衛春華), a fictional character in The Book and the Sword
- Jill Vidal (Chinese: 衛詩) often referred to as Wei Si or simply as Jill, is a Hong Kong-based female urban pop singer. Vidal is of Korean and Filipino ethnicity
- Wei Wang, Prince of Wei (衛王) from 621 to 628 and Prince of Wei (魏王) from 636 to 643 Wu Chengsi (died 698), Wu Zetian's nephew, known as Prince of Wei (魏王) after
- Wei Zhouzuo (simplified Chinese: 卫周祚; traditional Chinese: 衛周祚; pinyin: Wèi Zhōuzuò) (1612–1675), courtesy name Wenxi (simplified Chinese: 文锡; traditional
- King Wei of Qi, Duke Huan of Tian Qi from 374 to 357 BC Queens: Queen Wei (威後) Concubines: Wey Ji, of the Ji clan of Wey (衛姬 姬姓), the mother of Prince Jiaoshi Yu Ji, of the
- Wei Yuanzhong to the throne, and he immediately recalled Wei Yuanzhong and made him the minister of military supplies (衛尉卿, Weiwei Qing) and chancellor with the Tong
- Wiman of Gojoseon Wi Man (in Korean) or Wei Man (in Chinese) was originally a Chinese military leader from the Han dynasty Kingdom of Yan. When king Lu Wan of Yan was defeated
- Wei Xinghua (Chinese: 卫兴华; October 1925 – 6 December 2019) was a Chinese economist and educator. He specialized in the study of capital and contributed
- Wei Jin (born October 1959) is a general in the People's Liberation Army of China. He holds the rank of major general in the PLA. He began his political
- François Noël (missionary) known by its anglicization as Francis Noel. He was known to the Chinese as Wei Fangji. François Noël was a Fleming born on 18 August 1651 in Hestrud, Hainault
- Ugeo of Gojoseon (Korean: 위우거; Hanja: 衛右渠, died 108 BC) was the last king of Wiman Joseon, the last remnant of Gojoseon. He was a grandson of Wi Man. Ugeo was killed
- Wei Shuo (衛爍), calligrapher
