= 48 BC =

48 BC in various calendars
- Gregorian calendar: 48 BC; XLVIII BC
- Ab urbe condita: 706
- Ancient Egypt era: XXXIII dynasty, 276
- Pharaoh: Cleopatra VII, 4
- Ancient Greek Olympiad (summer): 183rd Olympiad (victor)¹
- Assyrian calendar: 4703
- Balinese saka calendar: N/A
- Bengali calendar: −641 – −640
- Berber calendar: 903
- Buddhist calendar: 497
- Burmese calendar: −685
- Byzantine calendar: 5461–5462
- Chinese calendar: 壬申年 (Water Monkey); 2650 or 2443 — to — 癸酉年 (Water Rooster); 2651 or 2444
- Coptic calendar: −331 – −330
- Discordian calendar: 1119
- Ethiopian calendar: −55 – −54
- Hebrew calendar: 3713–3714
- Hindu calendars
- Vikram Samvat: 9–10
- Shaka Samvat: N/A
- Kali Yuga: 3053–3054
- Holocene calendar: 9953
- Iranian calendar: 669 BP – 668 BP
- Islamic calendar: 690 BH – 689 BH
- Javanese calendar: N/A
- Julian calendar: N/A
- Korean calendar: 2286
- Minguo calendar: 1959 before ROC 民前1959年
- Nanakshahi calendar: −1515
- Seleucid era: 264/265 AG
- Thai solar calendar: 495–496
- Tibetan calendar: ཆུ་ཕོ་སྤྲེ་ལོ་ (male Water-Monkey); 79 or −302 or −1074 — to — ཆུ་མོ་བྱ་ལོ་ (female Water-Bird); 80 or −301 or −1073

Year 48 BC was a year of the pre-Julian Roman calendar. At the time, it was known as the Year of the Consulship of Caesar and Vatia (or, less frequently, year 706 Ab urbe condita). The denomination 48 BC for this year has been used since the early medieval period, when the Anno Domini calendar era became the prevalent method in Europe for naming years.

== Events ==
=== By place ===
==== Roman Republic ====
- Consuls: Gaius Julius Caesar and Publius Servilius Vatia Isauricus. Caesar is named consul for a period of five years.
- Caesar's Civil War:
  - January 4 – Julius Caesar lands at Dyrrhachium (Durazzo).
  - March – Mark Antony joins Julius Caesar.
  - April – Siege of Dyrrhachium: Julius Caesar builds a fortified line of entrenchments and besieges Pompey the Great.
  - The Roman temple to Bellona on the Capitolinus outside Rome is burnt to the ground.
  - May – Publius Servilius Vatia Isauricus, co-consul with Julius Caesar, destroys Caelius's magistrate's chair on his tribunal.
  - July 10 – Battle of Dyrrhachium: Julius Caesar barely avoids a catastrophic defeat to Pompey in Macedonia; he retreats to Thessaly.
  - August – Battle of Pharsalus: Julius Caesar decisively defeats Pompey at Pharsalus, who flees to Egypt. Pompey's army by and large is pardoned.
  - Winter – Siege of Oricum: Julius Caesar captures the strategic city port of Oricum in Epirus (modern Albania). The garrison opens the town's gate and Lucius Manlius Torquatus surrenders to Caesar.
  - December – Battle of Nicopolis: King Pharnaces II of Pontus defeats the Roman forces under Gnaeus Domitius Calvinus, a loyal partisan of Julius Caesar.

==== Egypt ====
- September 28 – Pompey the Great is assassinated on the orders of King Ptolemy XIII, after landing in Egypt (may have occurred September 29, records unclear).
- October – Julius Caesar reaches Alexandria, a city founded by Alexander the Great. He is met by an Egyptian delegation from Ptolemy XIII. The Egyptians offer him gifts: the ring of Pompey and his head.
- Queen Cleopatra VII returns to the palace rolled into a Persian carpet and has it presented to Caesar by her servant. The Egyptian princess, only twenty-one years old, becomes his mistress.
- December – Battle in Alexandria: Forces of Caesar and his ally Cleopatra VII and those of rival King Ptolemy XIII and Queen Arsinoe IV. The latter two are defeated and flee the city, but during the battle part of the Library of Alexandria catches fire.

==== Asia ====
- Yuan becomes emperor of the Han dynasty (until 33 BC).

== Births ==
- Lady Ban, Chinese concubine and female poet
- Lucius Calpurnius Piso, Roman consul (d. AD 32)
- Publius Cornelius Scipio, Roman consul and governor

== Deaths ==
- September 28 – Pompey (the Great), Roman politician (b. 106 BC)
- Afriana Carfania, Roman orator
- Cotys I, Thracian client king of the Odrysian kingdom
- Gnaeus Cornelius Lentulus Marcellinus, Roman statesman
- Lucius Cornelius Lentulus Crus, Roman politician
- Marcus Calpurnius Bibulus, Roman politician
- Titus Annius Milo, Roman politician
- Marcus Caelius Rufus, Roman orator and politician
- Zhang Chang, Chinese scholar and official
