= Hu Ke (actress) =

Chinese host and actress (born 1975)

- 胡可
- Born: December 1, 1975 (age 50); Jiaxing, Zhejiang, China
- Education: Communication University of China
- Occupations: Actress, Television presenter
- Years active: 1998-present
- Notable work: Moment in Peking
- Spouse: Sha Yi (m. 2011)
- Children: 2

Hu Ke (Chinese: 胡可; pinyin: Hú Kě; born 1 December 1975) is a Chinese host and actress best known for her role as Niu Suyun on Moment in Peking and has also starred in a number of films, including Chat, The Empire Symbol, and Goddesses in the Flames of War.

== Early life and education ==
Hu was born in Jiaxing, Zhejiang on December 1, 1975. In 1998 she graduated from Beijing Broadcasting Institute (now Communication University of China), where she majored in broadcasting and hosting. After college, she worked at Phoenix Satellite Television in Hong Kong for half a year. In 1998 she joined The Walt Disney Company, becoming a host in The Dragon Club. From 2002 to 2005 she was a host of Happy Mobilization. After hosting several TV programs, Hu entered the entertainment circle.

== Acting career ==
Hu made her television debut in the historical drama Storm of the Dragon (2000). Hu's first major television role was as Li Cuilian in Legendary Li Cuilian 2 (2001).

In 2002 she made her film debut in Chat, which earned her a Best Actress at the 9th Beijing College Student Film Festival. That same year, she landed a guest starring role on Affair of Half a Lifetime playing role of Shi Cuizhi.

Hu co-starred with Jimmy Lin and Calvin Li as Chu Chu in the wuxia television series The Tale of the Romantic Swordsman (2003). She was cast as Jin'er in the shenmo television series The Eighteen Arhats.

Hu played a key supporting role in Moment in Peking (2005) directed by Zhang Zi'en and based on the novel of the same name. She also played one of the lead roles in the shenmo television series Strange Tales of Liao Zhai opposite Huang Xiaoming. Hu co-starred with Nicholas Tse in the martial arts television series Wing Chun.

In 2007, Hu starred opposite Nie Yuan in Red Streamer, the series was one of the most watched ones in mainland China in that year. She played one of the lead characters in the fantasy drama Fairy Couple.

In 2008, she played the role of Su Quan in Royal Tramp, a television adaptation of Jin Yong' wuxia novel The Deer and the Cauldron.

Hu participated as Gu Dasao in All Men Are Brothers (2011), adapted from Ming dynasty novelist Shi Nai'an's classical novel Water Margin. That same year, she portrayed Princess Iron Fan in Journey to the West, based on the novel by the same name by Ming dynasty novelist Wu Cheng'en.

In 2012, Hu made her stage debut in Desire Garden.

In 2013, Hu took part in the stage play The Blind Message, based on the award-winningfilm of the same name. Hu also co-starred with Pan Yueming in the action film The Empire Symbol.

In September 2016, she joined the cast of Ruyi's Royal Love in the Palace as Imperial Noble Consort Chunhui.

Hu was part of the ensemble cast which featured in the war film Goddesses in the Flames of War (2017).

In June 2018, she played a supporting role in Legend of Fuyao, a fantasy adventure television series based on the novel Empress Fuyao. The same year, she also starred in the historical drama The Rise of Phoenixes.

== Personal life ==
In 2009 Hu first met actor Sha Yi (Chinese: 沙溢) at Hu Ke Xing Ganjue (胡可星感觉), in which he was a guest. They held their wedding ceremony in Beijing on February 20, 2011. They have two sons, Sha Junbo (Chinese: 沙俊伯; pinyin: Shā jùn bó), born on 16 July 2011, and Sha Junliang (Chinese: 沙俊良; pinyin: Shā jùn liáng), born on 19 August 2014.

== Filmography ==
=== Film ===
| Year | English title | Chinese title | Role | Notes |
|---|---|---|---|---|
| 2002 | Chat | 聊聊 | Qian Qiahao | |
| 2006 | Bean Curd Girl | 豆腐迷郎 | Wang Jin | |
| 2007 | Great Love Limitless | 大爱无垠 | Qin Lan | |
| 2008 | If You Are the One | 非诚勿扰 | | Cameo |
| 2011 | Lock Destination | 歼十出击 | Xi Muyu | |
| 2012 | All for Love | 三个未婚妈妈 | Nurse | |
| 2013 | Return The Money | 啊朋友还钱 | Wang Lixia | |
| 2013 | The Empire Symbol | 帝国秘符 | Mei Jia | |
| 2016 | Midnight Record Search | 午夜寻访录 | | |
| 2018 | Goddesses in the Flames of War | 那些女人 | Xi Shi | |
| 2019 | Push and Shove | 狗眼看人心 | | |
| 2019 | In Love with a Monster | 奇幻民宿 | | |

=== Television series ===
| Year | English title | Chinese title | Role | Notes |
|---|---|---|---|---|
| 2000 | Storm of the Dragon | 龙珠风暴 | Ya Ya | |
| 2000 | | 长缨在手 | Ah Jing | |
| 2001 | Legendary Li Cuilian 2 | 快嘴李翠莲2 | Li Cuilian | |
| 2002 | The Best Clown Under Heaven | 天下第一丑 | Fifth Princess | |
| 2002 | Affair of Half a Lifetime | 半生缘 | Shi Cuizhi | |
| 2002 | Family Interests | 家族利益 | | |
| 2003 | Ming Dynasty in 1449 | 大明王朝1449 | Nǚ Zhen | |
| 2003 | The Tale of the Romantic Swordsman | 书剑情侠柳三变 | Chu Chu | |
| 2003 | The Eighteen Arhats | 十八罗汉 | Jin'er | |
| 2004 | Good Luck Zhu Bajie | 福星高照猪八戒 | Zhu Zhu | |
| 2004 | Four Weeks Before Marriage | 婚前四周半 | Ding Ding | |
| 2004 | Strange Tales of Liao Zhai | 新聊斋志异 | Zhang Xiaoman | |
| 2004 | Colors of Life | 生命的颜色 | Liu Hexin | |
| 2004 | Magistrate Yellow Jacket | 县令黄马褂 | Meng Jiaojiao | |
| 2004 | | 生死十七天 | Sun Xiaofei | |
| 2005 | Moment in Peking | 京华烟云 | Niu Suyun | |
| 2005 | | 阿有正传 | Qian Wen | |
| 2005 | | 女人不惑 | Ning Kewei | |
| 2006 | Dongfang Shuo | 东方朔 | Princess Pingyang | |
| 2006 | Red Streamer | 红幡 | Yuan Jingru | |
| 2006 | Wing Chun | 咏春 | Kau Ku Leung | |
| 2007 | | 剑行天下 | Liu Wushuang | |
| 2007 | | 后来 | Cai Xiaomei | |
| 2007 | Fairy Couple | 天仙配 | Fifth Princess | |
| 2007 | | 暗流 | Zheng Yuanyuan | |
| 2007 | | 我爱芙蓉姐 | Xiao Lingling | |
| 2007 | | 风月·恶之花 | Zhen Yu | |
| 2008 | Royal Tramp | 鹿鼎记 | Su Quan | |
| 2008 | Wanton and Luxurious Living | 纸醉金迷 | Dongfang Manni | |
| 2009 | Do Not Lie To Me | 别对我说谎 | Han Zhenzhu | |
| 2009 | The Wedding | 嫁衣 | Host | |
| 2009 | Sniper's Shot | 冷枪 | Xiao Ziyun | |
| 2009 | Remembrance Of Dreams Past | 故梦 | Jin Lingzhi | |
| 2009 | Deep Love | 热爱 | Lu Pingxiang | |
| 2010 | Golden Anniversary II | 金婚风雨情 | Liu Tiemei | |
| 2010 | | 闯荡 | Tang Qiuyan | |
| 2010 | Remarry | 复婚 | Ding Yan | |
| 2010 | What Do You Want | 你到底要什么 | Wu Hongying | |
| 2010 | My Wife | 我的糟糠之妻 | Wang Yuening | |
| 2010 | Misty Mystery | 迷雾重重 | Lan Shuangshuang | |
| 2010 | Confession | 忏悔 | Tian Hongge | |
| 2011 | | 天堑·1949 | Yan Yi | |
| 2011 | Big Public Bathhouse | 大浴堂 | Yang Liuqing | |
| 2011 | I'm Waiting for You Home | 我在等你回家 | Fang Yuanyuan | |
| 2011 | All Men Are Brothers | 新水浒传 | Gu Dasao | |
| 2011 | Legends of the Message | 风声传奇 | Lin Yingchun | |
| 2011 | Fight till the End | 川军团血战到底 | Mei Yuejun | |
| 2011 | Journey to the West | 西游记 | Princess Iron Fan | |
| 2012 | Hongwu Big Case | 洪武大案 | Princess Anqing | |
| 2012 | Puzzle | 没有硝烟的战斗 | Li Huixiang | |
| 2012 | Choice | 抉择 | Huang Youlan | |
| 2013 | | 浦江危情 | Xie's wife | |
| 2013 | The Life and Death Struggle of Shanghai Bund | 上海滩之生死较量 | | |
| 2013 | Ming Dynasty Medical Saint Li Shizhen | 大明医圣李时珍 | Wu Siyu | |
| 2013 | Our Happy Life | 我们的快乐人生 | Chen Sufen | |
| 2013 | Child's Slave | 孩奴 | Lu Li | |
| 2014 | | 大酒商 | Yi Jiuemei | |
| 2014 | Lanterns | 花灯满城 | Third Concubine | |
| 2014 | The Moon of Gulf of Aden | 舰在亚丁湾 | Cao Bingbing | |
| 2015 | Little Beast Flowershop | 小野兽花店 | Ye Qing | |
| 2015 | Strange Stories from a Chinese Studio 4 | 聊斋新编 | Lian Suo | |
| 2016 | Chinese Style Relationship | 中国式关系 | Liu Lili | |
| 2016 | Political Commissar | 政委 | Aunt Miao | |
| 2017 | Love Architect | 爱情筑梦师 | Zi Jin | Not broadcast |
| 2017 | Invincible Daddy | 熊爸熊孩子 | Tao Jinzi | |
| 2018 | Ruyi's Royal Love in the Palace | 如懿传 | Su Luyun | |
| 2018 | Legend of Fuyao | 扶摇 | Xuanyuan Xiao | |
| 2018 | The Rise of Phoenixes | 天盛长歌 | Dahua | |
| 2019 | Mr. Fighting | 加油，你是最棒的 | Shi Rujing | |
| 2020 | I Will Find You a Better Home | 安家 | Feng Chunhua | |
| 2020 | Trident | 三叉戟 | Hua Jie | |
| 2020 | The Starting Line | 起跑线 | He Jinghua | |
| 2021 | Hand in Hand | 陪你一起长大 | He Jinghua | |
| 2021 | Faith Makes Great | 理想照耀中国 | Xue Rong | |
| 2021 | You Are My Glory | 你是我的荣耀 | Sister Ling | |
| 2021 | Medal of the Republic | 功勋 | Yu Su | |

=== Drama ===
| Year | English title | Chinese title | Role | Notes |
|---|---|---|---|---|
| 2012 | Desire Garden | 欲望花园 | Jenny | |
| 2013 | Blind Massage | 推拿 | Du Hong | |

== Awards and nominations ==
| Year | Award | Nominated work | Category | Result |
|---|---|---|---|---|
| 2002 | 9th Beijing College Student Film Festival | Chat | Best Actress | Won |
| 2010 | 3rd China TV Drama Awards | Remarry | Best Supporting Actress | Nominated |
| 2017 | 22nd Huading Awards | Chinese Style Relationship | Best Supporting Actress | Nominated |
| 2021 | 29th Huading Awards | Trident | Best Actress | Won |
| 2021 | 29th Huading Awards | Trident | Audience's Favorite TV Actors | Won |
