= Gongsun Ao =

Chinese general during the Western Han dynasty

- Traditional Chinese: 公孫敖
- Simplified Chinese: 公孙敖
Transcriptions
Standard Mandarin
- Hanyu Pinyin: Gōngsūn Ào

Gongsun Ao (died 96 BCE) was a Chinese military commander and general during the Western Han dynasty of China. He was noted for participating in the imperial campaigns against the Xiongnu.

== Life ==
Gongsun Ao was from Beidi which is presently in modern Heshui, Gansu. Gongsun Ao was known to be a skilled rider and archer. He entered service in the imperial palace as a cavalryman, and participated in small campaigns during the reign of Emperor Jing. Gongsun Ao became friends with Wei Qing after rescuing him from the custody of Princess Liu Piao (an elder sister of Emperor Jing) in 138 BC; Liu was the mother of Empress Chen Jiao, who was then madly jealous of Wei Zifu, Wei Qing's half-sister, who had the favour of Emperor Wu of Han. Gongsun Ao was promoted to a higher post as Superior Grand Master of the Palace.

Ao later partook in Wei Qing's many campaigns against the Xiongnu. For instance, he led 15,000 cavalry in one of the early campaigns but he failed to engage the Huns after travelling a distance of 2,000 li. Two years later, he was again part of another campaign led by Li Guang, proceeding from Yanmen with 10,000 cavalry and 30,000 infantry. During the offensives at Yanmen in 129 BC, he and Li Guang were heavily defeated by the Xiongnu. They were charged with treason. The Chinese also regarded both capture and defeat the same so Li Guang and Ao were both sentenced to death. However, they were allowed to buy off their death sentence and became commoners.

In 124 BCE, Ao was able to demonstrate his martial skills as a commander and became Marquis of Heqi. In the summer of 121 BC, Gongsun Ao joined Huo Qubing in an attack against the Xiongnu. After parting ways with Huo, Ao and his troops got lost in the desert. While Huo won great renown in battle later, Ao was sentenced to death for failing to meet up with Huo on time. Again, he paid a fine and was demoted to a commoner.

In 97 BC, he commanded a division of Li Guangli's army and was again defeated. He was sentenced to death due to his troops suffering heavy losses; he managed to escape but was later arrested. In the spring of 96 BC, his wife was implicated in a witchcraft case, which in turn implicated him. He was executed via waist chop, and his clan exterminated.
