= Belt hook =

Ancient device for fastening a belt

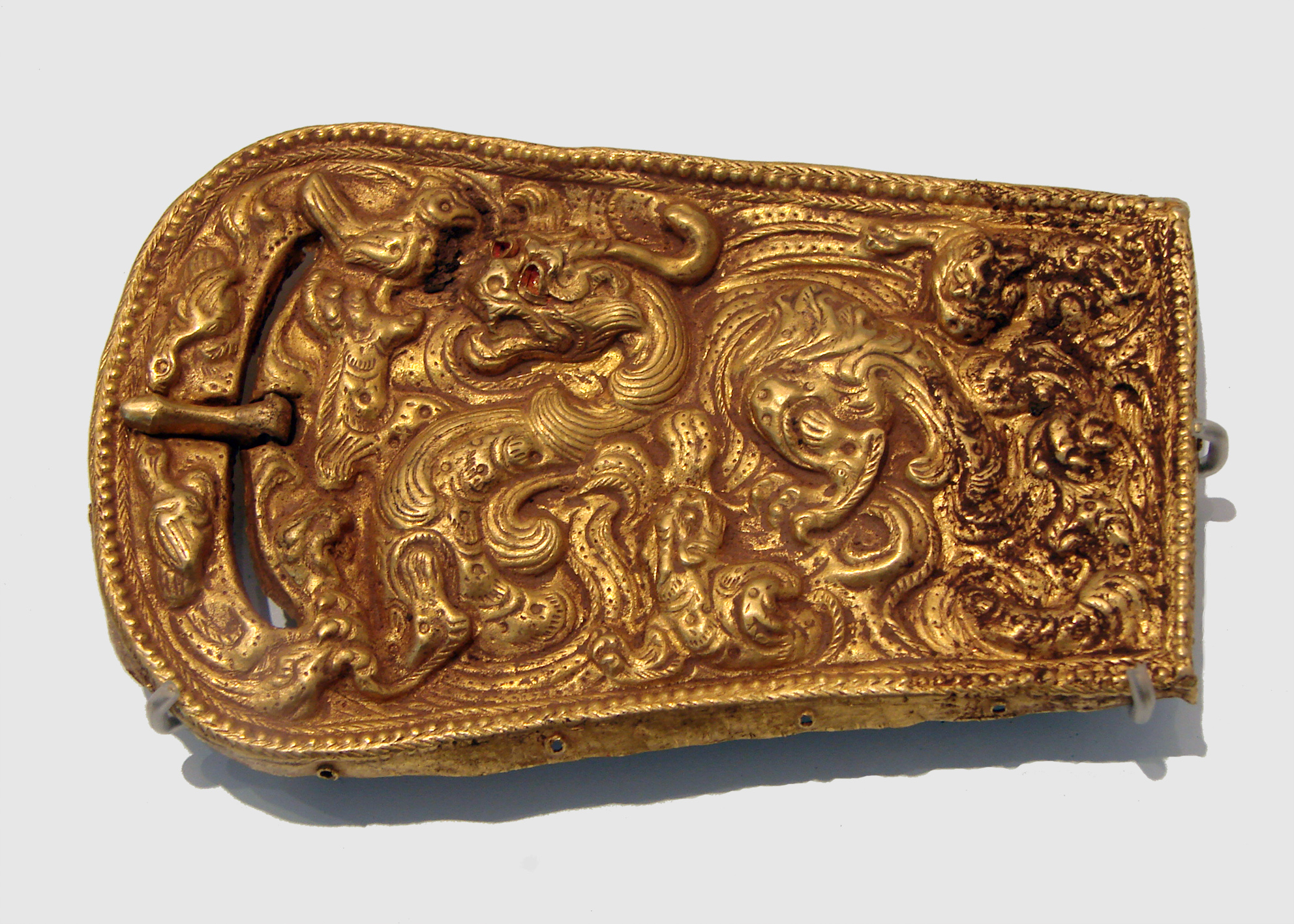
An Eastern-Han golden belt hook, hammered and chiseled with designs of mythical animals and birds

The belt hook is a device for fastening that predates the belt buckle.

== History ==
=== East Asia ===
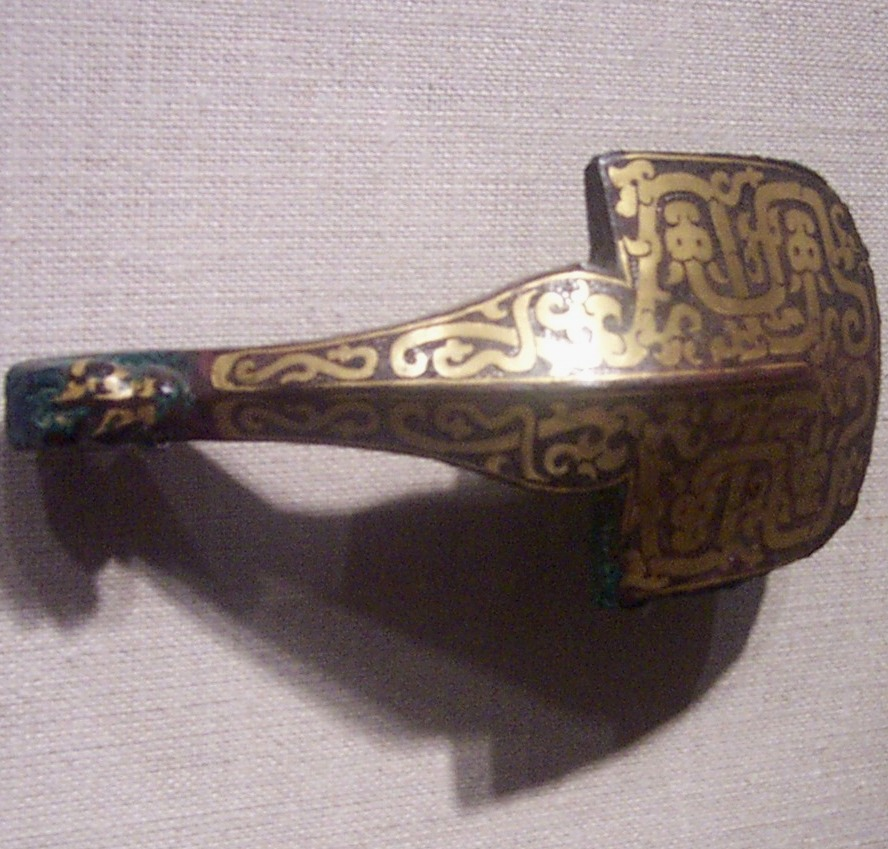
An Eastern-Han belt hook

The earliest archaeological evidence of belt hooks date to the 7th century BCE, in East Asia. Belt hooks were made with bronze, iron, gold, and jade. Texts from Warring States period China claim that the belt hook originates from Central Asian nomads, although belt hooks have been found in China predating the Warring States. The equestrian tradition, initially foreign to China, was tightly related to wearing belted pants, thus belt hooks became one of the features of "barbaric" exoticism. As such, the hooks became an object of aesthetic contemplation. For example, Qu Yuan (c. 340-278 BCE) compares beautiful women to the belt hooks xianbei (鮮卑).

=== Europe ===
Belt hooks have also been found in Celtic archaeological sites.
