= Princess Pingyang (Han dynasty) =

Han dynasty princess

- Grand Princess Yangxin
- Spouse: Cao Shi, Marquess of Pingyang; Xiahou Po, Marquess of Ruyin; Wei Qing, Marquess Lie of Changping
- Issue: Cao Xiang
- Father: Emperor Jing of Han
- Mother: Empress Wang Zhi

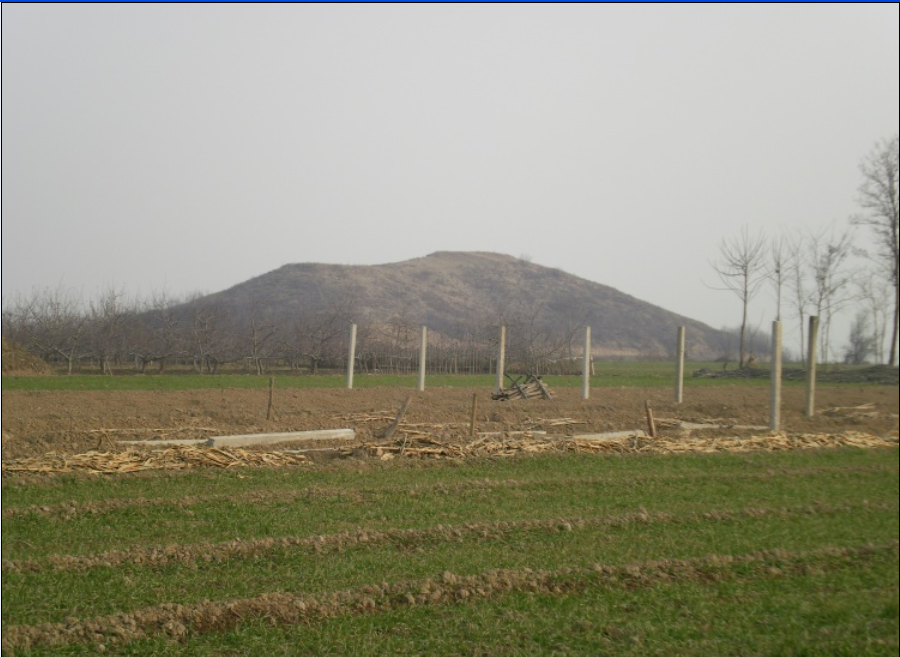
The tomb of Princess Pingyang in Xianyang, Shaanxi

Princess Pingyang (平陽公主) was a Western Han dynasty princess. She was the eldest daughter of Emperor Jing of Han and his second empress Empress Wang Zhi, the most famous sister of Emperor Wu, and the former master and later wife of renowned military general Wei Qing.

Her official title was actually Grand Princess Yangxin (陽信長公主), but because she married Cao Shi (曹时, also known as Cao Shou 曹寿), the Marquess of Pingyang (平陽侯), she was generally referred to as Princess Pingyang after her first husband's enfeoffment.

== Life ==
After her marriage to Cao Shi, Princess Pingyang had a son named Cao Xiang (曹襄). Some suspect that Cao Xiang was an adopted shu son rather than her biological son. Nonetheless, Cao Xiang inherited his father's title in 131 BC.

Princess Pingyang maintained a close relationship with her brother Emperor Wu, and he often visited her at her estate. She was instrumental in the union between Emperor Wu and Wei Zifu, who would eventually become his second empress. Wei Zifu was working as a singer/dancer at the princess' estate, when Emperor Wu took a liking to her and brought her back to his palace as a concubine. Wei Zifu's half-brother Wei Qing, who was also working in Princess Pingyang's estate as a stableboy, was sent along to serve the palace as a royal guard horsekeeper. He would later be promoted by Emperor Wu and achieve great military success in the war effort against Xiongnu.

After Cao Shi died in 131 BC, widowed Princess Pingyang remarried to Xiahou Po, the Marquis of Ruyin. After Xiahou Po committed suicide in 115 BC for adultery with his father's maid, she considered remarrying again, and her advisors suggested Wei Qing as a suitor. She initially hesitated because Wei Qing was her former servant, but agreed after being reminded that Wei Qing had already become a high-ranking marquis. After expressing her wishes through Empress Wei, Princess Pingyang married Wei Qing with the blessing from Emperor Wu, and remained his spouse for the remainder of their lives.
