= Chen Jiao =

Empress of China from 141 to 130 BC

Empress Chen of Wu 孝武陳皇后
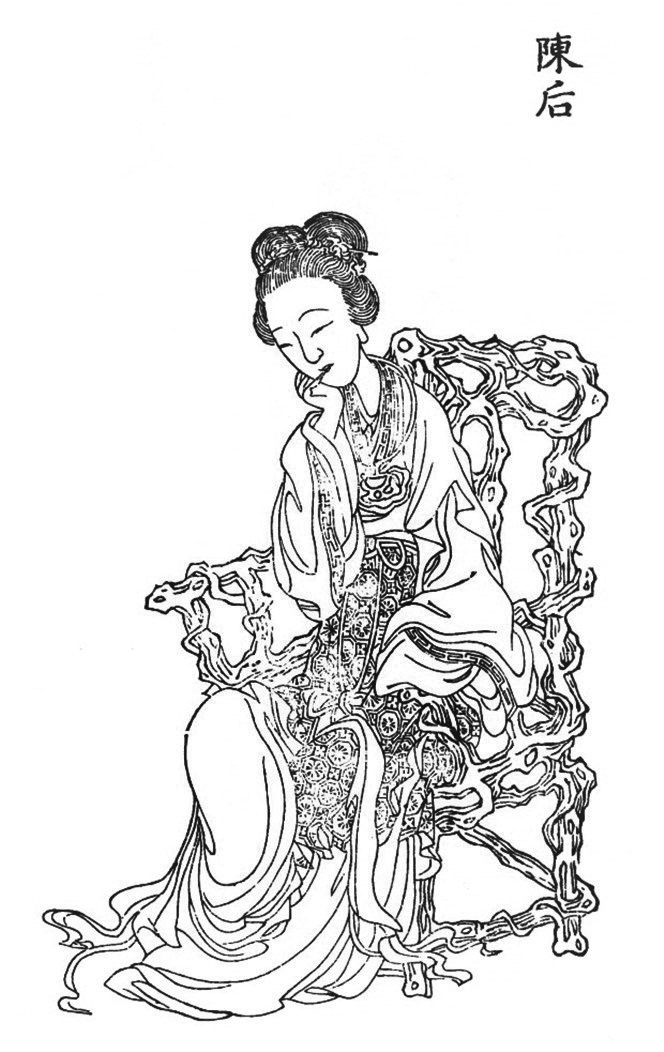

Empress consort of the Western Han dynasty
- Tenure: 141 – 20 August 130 BC
- Predecessor: Empress Wang Zhi
- Successor: Empress Wei Zifu
- Born: 166/165 BC
- Died: c. 110 BC
- Spouse: Emperor Wu of Han
Names
- Family name: Chen (陳); Given name: Jiao (嬌); Milk name: A'Jiao (阿嬌)
- House: Chen royal family Brothers: Chen Xu, Chen Yu (陈蟜)
- Dynasty: Han dynasty
- Father: Chen Wu, Marquess of Tangyi
- Mother: Eldest Princess Guantao

Empress Chen of Wu (孝武陳皇后) was empress of the Han dynasty and the first wife of Emperor Wu of Han (Liu Che). She was also known as Chen Jiao (simplified Chinese: 陈娇; traditional Chinese: 陳嬌; pinyin: Chén Jiāo; Wade–Giles: Ch'en Chiao) or as her milk name Chen A'Jiao (陈阿娇). She was born to Chen Wu (father) and Princess Guantao (mother), also making her Liu Che's older cousin. Her given name Jiao (嬌 / 娇) means talented and beautiful and features in various Chinese poems and idioms.

Princess Guantao Liu Piao once held a young Liu Che in her arms and asked him whether he wanted to marry her daughter Chen Jiao. The young prince boasted that he would "build a golden house for her" if they were married. Thus, there was an arranged marriage between Liu Che and Chen Jiao, and Chen Jiao became the first empress of China during Liu Che's reign. Empress Chen's story inspired the Chinese idiom "Putting Jiao in a golden house" (金屋藏嬌), recorded in Ban Gu's Hanwu Stories (汉武故事).

The poet Sima Xiangru wrote a song The Ode of Long Gate (長門賦 Changmenfu) describing the love between Empress Chen Jiao and Emperor Liu Che.

== Life ==
=== Early life and marriage ===
Empress Chen was the daughter of Chen Wu (陳午), the Marquess of Tangyi (堂邑侯), and Liu Piao (劉嫖), the Grand Princess Guantao (館陶長公主, the older sister of Emperor Jing of Han). Empress Chen also had two brothers, Chen Xu (陳須) and Chen Jiao (陳蟜 different hanzi). There were no authentic historical records of her real name, and the well-known name "A'Jiao" came from Hanwu Stories (漢武故事 / 汉武故事 also called Stories of Han Wudi) attributed to Ban Gu, but thought to be written during the Wei-Jin period.

Princess Guantao initially proposed to marry her teenage daughter to Liu Rong (劉榮), Emperor Jing's eldest son and crown prince at the time, as well as son of his favourite concubine, Lady Li (栗姬). However, Lady Li rudely rejected the proposal as she was upset that Princess Guantao often procured new concubines for Emperor Jing (therefore gaining his favour at the expense of Lady Li). A greatly humiliated and frustrated Princess Guantao then approached Consort Wang Zhi, another concubine favoured by Emperor Jing, and offered to marry her daughter to Consort Wang's 5-year-old son Liu Che, Emperor Jing's tenth (and arguably favourite) son and then the Prince of Jiaodong (膠東王). Consort Wang, who had been watching quietly from the sidelines, saw her opportunity and welcomed the proposal immediately. This political marriage secured an alliance between them. They then plotted together to ensure that Emperor Jing became increasingly annoyed at Lady Li. Coupled with Lady Li's own foolishness, it eventually resulted in the deposition of Liu Rong, who was demoted from crown prince to the Prince of Linjiang (臨江王) in 150 BC and exiled out of the capital Chang'an. Lady Li died soon after, and Liu Rong was arrested two years later for illegally seizing imperial shrine lands and committed suicide in custody. But Emperor Jing initially did not approve of the union between Liu Che and Chen Jiao due to their age difference (Chen was at least 8–9 years older than Liu Che).

However, according to the Wei-Jin era Hanwu Stories (漢武故事 / 汉武故事), during a royal gathering, Princess Guantao held the young prince in her arms and asked him whether he wanted to marry a girl. After rejecting the choice of dozens of palace maids, Princess Guantao eventually showed her daughter Chen Jiao to Liu Che, who bragged that he would "build a golden house for her" if they were married. This inspired the Chinese idiom "Putting Jiao in a golden house" (金屋藏嬌), first recorded in Ban Gu's Hanwu Stories. Princess Guantao then used the tale as proof that the marriage was destined to happen to convince Emperor Jing, who finally agreed to the arranged marriage.

Liu Che was later created crown prince at the age of 7, and formally married Chen as the empress-designate some years later. When Emperor Jing died in early 141 BC, the 16-year-old heir apparent Liu Che ascended to the throne as Emperor Wu, and formally made his newly-wed wife Empress not long after.

=== As empress ===
The Han dynasty up to this point was run according to a Taoist wu wei (無為而治) ideology, championing economic freedom and government decentralization. Foreign policy-wise, periodic heqin was used to maintain a de jure "peace" with the nomadic Xiongnu confederacy to the north. These policies were important in stimulating economic recovery following the post-Qin dynasty civil war, but not without drawbacks. The non-interventionist policies resulted in loss of monetary regulation and political control by the central government, allowing the feudal vassal states to become dominant and unruly, culminating in the Rebellion of the Seven States during Emperor Jing's reign. Nepotism among the ruling classes also stagnated social mobility, as well as encouraged rampant disregard of laws by nobles, which led to the rise of local despots who bullied and oppressed other civilians. The heqin policy also failed to protect the Han borders against Xiongnu raids, with the nomadic cavalries invading as close as 300 li from the capital during Emperor Wen's reign. Prominent politicians like Jia Yi (賈誼) and Chao Cuo (晁錯) had both previously advised on the necessity to important policy reforms, but neither Emperor Wen nor Emperor Jing was willing to implement such changes.

Unlike the emperors before him, the young Emperor Wu was unwilling to put up with the status quo. Less than a year after his ascension, based on advice from Confucian scholars, Emperor Wu launched an ambitious reform, known in history as the Jianyuan Reforms (建元新政). However, his reforms threatened the interests of existing noble classes, and was swiftly defeated by his grandmother, Grand Empress Dowager Dou, who held real political power in the Han court. His two noble supporters, Dou Ying (竇嬰) and Tian Fen (田蚡), both had their positions stripped; and his two mentors, Wang Zang (王臧) and Zhao Wan (趙綰), were impeached, arrested and forced to commit suicide in prison. Emperor Wu, who was now deprived of any allies, was subjected to conspiracies to have him removed from the throne.

At this point, Empress Chen had already married Emperor Wu for years but did not achieve any pregnancies. In an attempt to remain the centre of his attention, she also prohibited him from keeping other concubines. The fact that the young and energetic Emperor Wu was still childless had been used by his political enemies as an excuse to consider deposing him (the inability to propagate the royal bloodline was a serious matter) and replace him with his distant uncle Liu An (劉安), the king of Huainan (淮南王), who was a renowned figure of Taoist ideology. Emperor Wu's political survival now relied heavily on the lobbying of his aunt/mother-in-law Princess Guantao, who served as a mediator for the Emperor's reconciliation with her mother, Grand Empress Dowager Dou. Princess Guantao wasted no opportunities to exploit this leverage, and constantly made excessive demands from her son-in-law and even beyond that, she used her influence on her mother to pressure him if he did not accept her demands.

As the daughter of the Grand Empress Dowager Dou, and both the emperor aunt and mother-in-law and also as one who had helped establish and maintain the emperor in power, Princess Guantao received the unprecedented title of Grand Princess Dou (窦太主, Dòu tài zhǔ); This position uniquely gave her far greater imperial privileges at court. Emperor Wu, already unhappy with Empress Chen's infertility and poor behavior, was further enraged by her mother's greed, but had to tolerate such abuse under the advice by his mother Empress Dowager Wang to stay put and wait for his chance. He then spent the next few years pretending to be docile, hedonistic and having given up all political ambitions, but in reality was secretly recruiting supporters.

While attending an annual spring ceremonial ritual at Bashang (灞上) in 139 BC, during the second year of his reign, Emperor Wu decided to pay a casual visit to his older sister's household on the way back. His sister, Princess Pingyang (平陽公主), who had long intended to imitate her aunt Princess Guantao and establish herself some political leverage, had prepared a collection of young women to offer for her brother's concubinage. However, her plan did not work out, as none of her candidates managed to impress Emperor Wu. Realizing her brother was disappointed and bored, she called in her in-house dancers for entertainment. This time, Emperor Wu set his eyes on a beautiful young singer called Wei Zifu (衛子夫) and had immediately fallen in love with her. Following a romantic encounter with Wei Zifu, Emperor Wu immediately conferred a thousand pieces of gold to his sister as a reward, who in turn offered the new girl to him as a gift. However, after returning to Chang'an, Emperor Wu was forced to abandon Wei Zifu as an insignificant palace maid and neglected her for over a year under pressure from Empress Chen. They did not meet again until Wei Zifu attempted to leave the palace by blending into a queue of maids due to be expelled. With the old love renewed, Wei Zifu soon fell pregnant, effectively clearing Emperor Wu of any speculation of infertility. This ensured her becoming his favourite concubine.

The sudden rise of a love rival enraged Empress Chen, but she could do little as Wei Zifu was now under the Emperor Wu's direct protection. Princess Guantao then tried to seek vengeance for her daughter, and after finding out that Wei Zifu had a half-brother named Wei Qing (衛青) serving as a horseman in Jianzhang Camp (建章營, Emperor Wu's Royal Guards), she sent men to kidnap and murder Wei Qing. However, Wei Qing was rescued by his friends, a group of palace guards led by Gongsun Ao (公孫敖), who also reported the whole incident to Emperor Wu. As a sign of annoyance towards Empress Chen and her mother, Emperor Wu publicly made Wei Zifu a consort (夫人, a concubine lower only to the empress), appointed Wei Qing to the Chief of Jianzhang Camp (建章監), Chief of Staff (侍中) and Chief Councillor (太中大夫), promoted several other members of the Wei family, and rewarded everyone who contributed to Wei Qing's rescue. Consort Wei Zifu then went on to monopolize Emperor Wu's love for over a decade and bore him three daughters.

Empress Chen, now having openly fallen out with Emperor Wu, was largely neglected. Frustrated and jealous, she tried in vain to regain her husband's attention by threatening suicide multiple times, which only made Emperor Wu more angry at her. Helpless and despairing, she again turned to her mother to vent her anger. Her mother then confronted and accused Princess Pingyang of sabotaging her daughter's marriage, but was simply brushed off with the statement that Empress Chen lost favour purely because of her own infertility. Baffled by the argument, Empress Chen then spent over 90 million coins seeking treatment, to no avail. However, because Emperor Wu no longer visited her palace since the Wei Qing incident, it was already impossible for her to achieve a pregnancy.

=== Witchcraft ===
Now having completely lost her husband's love, Empress Chen bore great jealousy and hatred towards Consort Wei. She eventually resorted to the occult as a last-ditch attempt to salvage the situation, and was approached by a witch named Chu Fu (楚服), who claimed she had magical tricks that could help to restore the Emperor's love, as well as curse any concubines Empress Chen disliked. Completely convinced by the witch, Empress Chen conducted rituals with Chu Fu day and night, drank potions, created nailed voodoo dolls of Consort Wei, and slept together "like husband and wife" with Chu Fu dressed in men's garment.

Witchcraft was a capital offence according to Han laws, especially if it involved noble families. Empress Chen's association with Chu Fu was soon discovered, and Emperor Wu assigned the infamously feared prosecutor Zhang Tang (張湯) to investigate. After Zhang's massive crackdown, Chu Fu was arrested and executed by decapitation, along with more than 300 other accused individuals. Emperor Wu then issued an edict officially deposing Empress Chen from the position of empress on 20 August 130 BC, and exiled her out of the capital Chang'an and placed her under house arrest at the Long Gate Palace (長門宮), a suburban household that Princess Guantao once offered to Emperor Wu as a gift for tolerating her private scandals, although Emperor Wu had promised her aunt that the ex-empress would be supplied with all the daily living necessities.

Two years later in 128 BC, Consort Wei gave birth to Emperor Wu's first son, Liu Ju, and was created empress for her contribution to the royal bloodline. Her brother Wei Qing and her nephew Huo Qubing would go on to become two of the most esteemed military generals in Han history, further consolidating her position. In 122 BC, Liu Ju was also created crown prince. With the secure establishment of Empress Wei, any chance of Empress Chen's reinstatement was all but gone.

As a result, she sometimes goes by the nickname Chen Feihou (陳廢后), with 'Fei' meaning "deposed".

=== Later life ===
Empress Chen spent the rest of her life in Long Gate Palace. Still refusing to give up, she hired the famous poet Sima Xiangru to compose a song later known as The Ode of Long Gate (長門賦), hoping it would draw Emperor Wu's sympathy. Emperor Wu was so touched by the song that he revisited and loved her again. Historical records indicate that Emperor Wu rewarded Sima Xiangru for his work.

One year after Empress Chen's deposition, her father Chen Wu died. The widowed Princess Guantao, who was already having an adulterous relationship with her 18-year-old godson Dong Yan (董偃), was focused on her young lover. When Emperor Wu learned of this, he let the scandal slip as a leverage in exchange for Princess Guantao's now submissive behaviour. A few years after Dong's death at the age of 30, the grieving Princess Guantao died in 116 BC, leaving behind a will to be buried with Dong instead of her late husband. During her filial mourning period, her two sons (Empress Chen's brothers) Chen Xu and Chen Yu (陈蟜) got into a dispute over the inheritance, each committed adultery and incest. They both committed suicide the same year.

A few years later, the ex-Empress Chen died, about 20 years after deposition, and was buried east of the Langguan Pavilion (郎官亭) in Baling County (霸陵縣), about 30 li northeast of Chang'an, outside of her ancestral cemeteries.

== Romance with Emperor Wu ==
=== Jiao in Golden House ===
When Liu Che was five years old he said that he said he would build a golden house for Chen Jiao, which would lead to the Chinese idiom: putting Jiao in a golden house (金屋藏娇). As Chen Jiao was also Liu Che's cousin and daughter of Chen Wu and Liu Piao, the relationship between the two families was close and would remain so for the ensuing centuries.

Empress Chen was Liu Che's first wife, and Liu Che is often considered one of the greatest emperors in the Han dynasty and Chinese history in general. During Liu Che and Chen Jiao's reign, the Han dynasty of China would begin to greatly expand in territory in all directions and subjugate the northern Xiongnu nomads, thereby ushering in a golden age for China.

For her role as the first empress during this golden era, Empress Chen would become the subject of much writing, poetry, odes, and idioms in historical texts written on the Han dynasty, including Ode of Long Gate, Hanwu Stories, etc.

=== Age difference ===
As there are no reliable historical records of Empress Chen's birth year, it is almost impossible to accurately calculate her age difference to Emperor Wu. However, Chen Jiao was originally intended to marry Liu Rong, Emperor Wu's eldest brother. Though Liu Rong's birth year was also omitted in historical records, it was possible to estimate his age by looking at historical records.

One of Emperor Wu's older brothers, Liu Fei (劉非, Emperor Jing's fifth son), was recorded to be 12 years older than Emperor Wu; he was about 15 years old during the Rebellion of the Seven States, while the young Liu Che was only 3. Between Liu Rong and Liu Fei, there were two brothers born to Lady Li (Liu Rong's mother) and one brother born to Liu Fei's mother, meaning Liu Rong was at least 2 years older than Liu Fei and hence at least 14 years older than Emperor Wu. At the time of Princess Guantao's proposal, Liu Rong would have been around the age of 20, meaning that Chen Jiao would have to be at least in the mid-teens (otherwise she would be too young for marriage). Considering Liu Che was only 5 years old at the time of arranged marriage, the age difference between him and his cousin fiancée would be at least 8–9 years.

== Poetry ==
The Ode of Long Gate (長門賦 Changmenfu) is part of the Fu (poetry) genre and was written by Sima Xiangru on the love between Empress Chen and Emperor Liu.

The original text is:

夫何一佳人兮，步逍遥以自虞。魂逾佚而不反兮，形枯槁而独居。言我朝往而暮来兮，饮食乐而忘人。心慊移而不省故兮，交得意而相亲。 伊予志之慢愚兮，怀真悫之欢心。愿赐问而自进兮，得尚君之玉音。奉虚言而望诚兮，期城南之离宫。修薄具而自设兮，君曾不肯乎幸临。

A rough English translation is:

What a beautiful woman, free, unfettered, and full of joy. The soul is lost without turning back, and it is withered and living alone. I'm happy to eat and forget people. Move your heart without losing your mind, make a proud and blind date. Her goal may take time and be foolish, but she is full of good will and happiness. Willing to ask questions and enter, you will hear the beautiful voice of the monarch. Looking at honesty and sincerity in vain, it is expected to leave the palace in the south of the city. Healing the thin body and building up oneself, for the monarch it is not just etiquette.

Notes: 兮 xi is an ancient exclamation particle similar to 啊 a or 呀 ya.

== Popular culture ==
- 1990 TV series Han Wudi, portrayed by Yu Hui (actress)
- 2000 BMN TV series The Prince of Han Dynasty, portrayed by He Jiayi
- 2005 CCTV TV series The Emperor in Han Dynasty, portrayed by Xu Hongna
- 2014 Zhejiang Huace Film and Now TV series The Virtuous Queen of Han, portrayed by Zheng Yuanyuan (郑媛元)
- 2014 HT TV series Sound of the Desert

== See also ==
- Emperor Wu of Han
- Sima Xiangru, wrote love song on Chen Jiao and Liu Che

Note there is another Han dynasty person named Chen Jiao (陳矯), who was male and a politician. He was also Empress Chen's brother.

Chinese royalty
Preceded by Empress Wang Zhi	Empress of the Western Han dynasty 141 – 20 Aug 130 BC	Succeeded by Empress Wei Zifu
