= Liu Ju =

Crown prince of the Han dynasty (128–91 BC)

Crown prince of the Han dynasty
- Tenure: 1 June 122 BC – 30 September 91 BC
- Predecessor: Crown Prince Liu Che
- Successor: Crown Prince Liu Shi
- Born: early 128 BC
- Died: 30 September 91 BC (aged 37); Hu county, Han China
- Spouse: Consort Shi
- Issue: Liu Jin two other sons a daughter
Posthumous name
- Crown Prince Li (戾太子; "the unrepentant crown prince")
- Father: Emperor Wu of Han
- Mother: Wei Zifu

Liu Ju (Chinese: 劉據; early 128 – 30 September 91 BC), formally known as Crown Prince Wei (衛太子) and posthumously as Crown Prince Li (戾太子; lit. ''the unrepentant crown prince'', with "Li" being an unflattering adjective) was a Western Han dynasty crown prince. He was the eldest son and heir apparent of Emperor Wu and served as the prince regent in his father's later years until his death at age 38 (by East Asian age reckoning) due to political violence.

After being falsely accused of cursing his father via witchcraft and denied access to plea innocence, Liu Ju led an uprising in 91 BC with his own royal guards, retainers and conscripted militia to purge the conspirators, but surviving conspirators used this opportunities to selectively report and convince the senile Emperor Wu — who had been spending most of his elderly days vacating in summer resort Ganquan Palace, surrounded by people who preferred Liu Ju deposed — that Liu Ju was conducting a treasonous rebellion, leading Emperor Wu to issue an imperial crackdown. After losing the battle against his father's regular army (led by his political enemies) and forced to fled the capital Chang'an, Liu Ju was hunted down by local government soldiers and committed suicide by hanging, and his entire family were also killed in the political turmoil with the only exception of a month-old infant grandson Liu Bingyi, who was thrown into prison before being pardoned by an amnesty, grew up among commoners and eventually reclaimed the throne 18 years later as Emperor Xuan.

== Family background and birth ==
Liu Ju's mother, Empress Wei Zifu, was Emperor Wu's second wife. Emperor Wu's first wife was Empress Chen Jiao (who was also his older cousin). She was infertile and had a jealous personality. Moreover, when she was found employing witchcraft to curse Emperor Wu's other concubines (aimed at Wei Zifu in particular), she was officially deposed in August 130 BC, leaving open the position of empress. Wei Zifu had become Emperor Wu's new favourite consort since 138 BC and had by then already given him three daughters. In 128 BC, she gave birth to Liu Ju, Emperor Wu's first son, and was created empress as a result in April that year.

It was recorded that Emperor Wu, who was already 29 years old when his first son was born, was overjoyed and ordered poets to write paeans celebrating the arrival of the "grand prince", hinting Liu Ju would become his imperial heir by default. Prince Ju was later formally created crown prince in June 122 BC, at the age of 6.

== As crown prince ==
Emperor Wu had high hopes for Prince Ju, and made sure he got the best education possible, even constructing the "Broad Vision Academy" (博望苑) to allow his son exposure to all schools of scholars. It is unclear when Liu Ju became involved in government affairs, but as he matured and Emperor Wu began to take more time away from the capital, from 113 BC he was entrusted as the prince regent while his father was absent. His mother Empress Wei, ageing and no longer a favourite of Emperor Wu, was still entrusted to look after domestic palace affairs. Both Liu Ju and Empress Wei remained well respected by Emperor Wu.

Unlike Emperor Wu, who was at times megalomanic and always looking for territorial expansion which burdened his people to their limit, Liu Ju was regarded as a man of peace, interested more in the social well-being and economic recovery of the people, and openly opposed his father on many policies. He was well known for his hospitality and openness to different opinions, and he maintained a large group of advisers and friends at his palace. Because Liu Ju favoured more lenient policies and often helped overturn wrongful convictions, he frequently had conflicts with legal officials who had received promotions from following his father's harsher, more authoritarian policies.

In 113 BC, Liu Ju married his only well-known consort, Lady Shi (史良娣), who bore him a son Liu Jin (劉進). Liu Jin would later produce a young grandson, who was only months old when his entire family were killed during the 91 BC political turmoil. Liu Ju also had two other sons and a daughter.

While Liu Ju's well-respected uncle, General Wei Qing was alive, Crown Prince Ju was safe politically. After Wei Qing died in 106 BC, certain officials and factions started plotting against Liu Ju.

== Forced into rebellion ==
Near the end of his reign, the physically deteriorating Emperor Wu became increasingly paranoid and fearful of others using witchcraft against him, especially after incidents involving the sighting/hallucination of an armed stranger walking by as well as a nightmare of hundreds of small wooden puppets beating him with sticks. A massive crackdown was ordered and those who were suspected of witchcraft were often summarily executed along with their entire clans. Many important people became victims of this witch-hunt, which peaked during early 91 BC, including the entire family of Prime Minister Gongsun He (公孫賀, Liu Ju's maternal uncle-in-law), Liu Ju's sisters (and Emperor Wu's own daughters) Princesses Yangshi (陽石公主) and Princess Zhuyi (諸邑公主), as well as Wei Qing's son Wei Kang (衛忼), effectively removing almost all of the Crown Prince's political supporters in the Han court.

Furthermore, Emperor Wu's favourite concubine was now the young Lady Zhao (趙婕妤), who was also known as "Lady Fist" (拳夫人) or "Lady Hook" (鉤弋夫人) due to legend that she was born with a contractured clenched fist, which somehow magically opened up when Emperor Wu massaged it, revealing a jade hook in the palm. She gave birth to Emperor Wu's youngest son Liu Fuling after a rumoured 14-month-long pregnancy, same as the legendary Emperor Yao. Overjoyed that he could still father a son with such divine implications at the age of 66, the superstitious Emperor Wu named Lady Zhao's household the "Gate of Yao's Mother" (堯母門). This gesture did not go unnoticed, and speculations started to rise that he intended to replace Liu Ju with the 3-year-old Prince Fuling as the new crown prince. Such speculation fuelled further conspiracies to dethrone Liu Ju.

One of the conspirators against Crown Prince Ju was Jiang Chong (江充), the ruthless and opportunistic head of the secret intelligence, who once had a run-in with Prince Ju after arresting one of Prince Ju's assistants for improper use of an imperial right of way. Fearing that with Emperor Wu's health declining, Crown Prince Ju would one day ascend to the throne and punish him for their past clashes, Jiang Chong decided that he had to remove the Crown Prince once and for all. One other conspirator was Emperor Wu's chief eunuch Su Wen (蘇文), who had falsely and repeatedly accused Liu Ju of committing adultery with Emperor Wu's junior concubines. Su Wen also blocked any attempts by Liu Ju and Empress Wei to communicate with Emperor Wu, who was then staying at his summer palace in Ganquan (甘泉, in modern Xianyang, Shaanxi).

In the same year, Jiang Chong and Su Wen decided to move against Liu Ju, once again using witchcraft as an excuse. Jiang, with the approval of Emperor Wu, searched through various palaces, ostensibly for witchcraft items, eventually reaching Empress Wei and Liu Ju's household. Jiang's men dug holes everywhere, leaving barely room for the Empress and Crown Prince to lay their beds. Jiang Chong then planted dolls and pieces of cloth with mysterious writing in Liu Ju's palace, and then announced that he found evidence of witchcraft. Liu Ju, initially believing that he had nothing to hide, was shocked and forced to consider his options, and his teacher Shi De (石德), invoking the story of Zhao Gao's plot to murder Ying Fusu and raising the possibility that Emperor Wu might already be deceased, suggested that Liu Ju should start an uprising to remove Jiang. Liu Ju initially hesitated and wanted to speedily proceed to Ganquan Palace and explain himself to his father, but he found out that Jiang's messengers were already on their way to report the "crime". So he decided to accept Shi's suggestion.

Liu Ju arranged for one of his men to impersonate a messenger from Emperor Wu and arrest Jiang Chong's party. However, Su Wen managed to escape arrest. After they were subdued, Liu Ju personally executed Jiang on 1 September. He then reported his actions to his mother, who authorised him the right to mobilise her palace guards and distribute weapons to any civilian supporters he could muster in preparation to defend himself against any retaliation from Jiang's co-conspirators. Meanwhile, Su Wen fled to Ganquan Palace and told Emperor Wu that the Crown Prince was going to overthrow him in a rebellion. Emperor Wu, refusing to believe his benevolent son would commit treason and (correctly at this point) concluding that Prince Ju was merely angry at Jiang Chong. So the Emperor decided to send a low-ranking eunuch to the capital Chang'an to summon Prince Ju to provide an explanation for his actions. This messenger did not dare to proceed to Chang'an, but instead falsely reported to Emperor Wu that he fled because Prince Ju was going to kill him. By now enraged, Emperor Wu ordered his nephew, Prime Minister Liu Qumao (劉屈犛), to put down the rebellion.

Prince Ju also sent two messengers in attempts to mobilise regular armies. One was sent to a detachment of surrendered Xiongnu cavalry stationed outside the capital, but Emperor Wu's messenger had arrived just earlier and ordered the cavalry to attack Prince Ju instead. The other messenger was sent to the North Army in charge of guarding the capital, but the commander-in-charge, Ren An (任安), refused to get involved. Without regular army support, Prince Ju's forces, consisting only palace guards and armed civilians, were no match for Liu Qumao's army. Furthermore, after Emperor Wu's banner was displayed outside the capital city, it became clear that Emperor Wu was still in charge and Prince Ju did not have his father's authorisation. So public support for the Crown Prince disappeared. The two sides then battled in the streets of Chang'an for five days, and Liu Qumao's forces prevailed. On 9 September, Prince Ju was forced to flee the capital with two of his sons. On that same day, his mother, Empress Wei, committed suicide after Emperor Wu sent messengers to seize her seal as a punishment of supporting her son's uprising. The rest of Prince Ju's family were then killed, with the only exception of the months-old grandson Liu Bingyi, who was thrown into prison.

Emperor Wu ordered that Prince Ju be hunted down, but after a junior official, Linghu Mao (令狐茂), risked his life and spoke on Prince Ju's behalf, Emperor Wu's anger began to subside, but he had not yet issued a pardon for his son. At this point, Liu Ju had fled to Hu County (湖縣, in modern Sanmenxia, Henan) and took refuge in the home of a poor shoemaker. Knowing the financial burden imposed on his warm-hearted host, Liu Ju attempted to seek help from an old friend living in Hu County, but this exposed his whereabouts. Local officials quickly tracked down and surrounded the house. Seeing no chance of escape, Liu Ju committed suicide by hanging. His two sons and the family hosting them all died when government soldiers finally broke in and killed everyone. The officials in charge, Li Shou (李壽) and Zhang Fuchang (張富昌), then wasted no times to take Liu Ju's body to Chang'an and claim rewards from Emperor Wu, who had to keep his word despite great sorrow over his son's death.

== Posthumous developments ==
Eventually, Emperor Wu began to realize that the witchcraft cases during 91 BC were often false accusations. In 89 BC, when Tian Qianqiu (田千秋), then the superintendent of Emperor Gao's temple, filed a report claiming that "a white-haired old man" told him in a dream that for the offence of armed uprising, Prince Ju would at most be caned, not killed, as a punishment, Emperor Wu realised what had really happened. Furious that the conspirators had abused his trust and plotted his son's death, he had Su Wen burned alive, Jiang Chong's immediate and extended family executed, and killed every official who had received promotions for tracking down the Crown Prince. He also promoted Tian Qianqiu to prime minister, and made major policy changes that supported the ideals supported by his dead son. To express his regret over causing his son's death, Emperor Wu also built the Palace of Son-Grieving (思子宮) and Platform of Longing for Return (歸來望思台), officially rehabilitating Liu Ju's name.

Liu Ju's only surviving offspring, his grandson Liu Bingyi, would eventually become emperor (as Emperor Xuan) in 74 BC following the death of Crown Prince Ju's childless younger brother Emperor Zhao and a brief reign by their nephew, Prince He of Changyi. Out of respect for Emperor Zhao, Emperor Xuan did not initially attempt to restore the title of his grandfather. It was not until 73 BC that he restored Crown Prince Ju's title (but with the rather unflattering posthumous name of "Li", which means "unrepentant") and reburied his grandparents and parents.
