= Wei Zifu =

Empress of China from 128 to 91 BC

Empress of the Western Han dynasty
- Tenure: 30 April 128 BC – 9 September 91 BC
- Predecessor: Empress Chen
- Successor: Empress Shangguan
- Born: Unknown (Note: Although Lady Wei's birth year was not recorded, she was noted to be a young woman in 139 BC when she caught the eye of Emperor Wu. Thus, her birth year should be in the 150s BC.)
- Died: 9 September 91 BC; Chang'an
- Spouse: Emperor Wu of Han
- Issue: Grand Princess Wei; Princess Shiyi; Princess Zhuyi; Liu Ju, Crown Prince Wei
Names
- Family name: Wei (衛); Given name: Zifu (子夫)
Posthumous name
- Empress Si (思后)
- Mother: Madame Wei (衛媼)

Wei Zifu (simplified Chinese: 卫子夫; traditional Chinese: 衛子夫; pinyin: Weì Zǐfū; Wade–Giles: Wei Tzu-fu; died 9 September 91 BC), posthumously known as Empress Xiaowusi (孝武思皇后; lit. ''the filial, martial and thoughtful empress'') or Thoughtful Empress Wei (衛思后; Weì Sī Hòu), was an empress consort of the Chinese Han dynasty. She was the second wife of the famous Emperor Wu and his spouse for 49 years. She stayed as his empress for 38 years, the second longest in Chinese history (behind only the 47-year reign of Empress Wang, the wife of Ming dynasty's Wanli Emperor, who lived over 1,600 years later). She was the mother of Emperor Wu's heir apparent Liu Ju and a great-grandmother of Liu Bingyi (Emperor Xuan). She was also an elder half-sister of the famed general Wei Qing, aunt of Huo Qubing, (Note: Huo Qubing's mother was Wei Zifu's elder sister Wei Shao'er.) and step-aunt of statesman Huo Guang. (Note: Huo Guang was Qubing's half-brother (same father).)

== Family background and early years ==
Wei Zifu was born of humble means to a serf family. She was the fourth child and the youngest daughter of a lowly housemaid/servant at the household of Princess Pingyang (平陽公主), Emperor Wu's older sister. Her father presumably died around the time of her birth, as there were few historic records of most of her family members. Her younger half-brother Wei Qing, born not long after her, was an illegitimate child from an extramarital affair by her mother with a low-level official serving the Princess's household. When Wei Zifu was still young, she was recruited as a courtesan at the princess' estate, where she was also trained in dancing and the four arts. Wei Zifu was good at singing and composing, she also had beautiful long hair.

== Encountering Emperor Wu and consortship ==
Emperor Wu's relationship with his newly-wed first wife, Empress Chen, started to strain not long after he ascended to the throne at age 16. Empress Chen was an older cousin who was at least 8 years his senior, and their union was arranged from the political alliance between his mother Consort Wang Zhi (王夫人) and his paternal aunt Grand Princess Guantao (館陶長公主), when he was barely 6 years old. The marriage was consummated at some point after Emperor Wu was then created the crown prince, but soon soured after Empress Chen was unable to bear him any children after many years. This tension further deteriorated after the young Emperor Wu, whose political survival at the time relied heavily on lobbying from his aunt/mother-in-law after the defeat of his ambitious reform in 140 BC by his grandmother Grand Empress Dowager Dou, was forced to submit to the spoilt and abusive behavior of Empress Chen.

After conducting an annual ceremonial ritual at Bashang (灞上, between present-day Baqiao District and Lantian County of Xi'an, Shaanxi) in the spring of 139 BC, Emperor Wu took the opportunity to pay a casual visit to his older sister Princess Pingyang, whose household happened to be nearby. Princess Pingyang, intending to gain favour with her royal brother by imitating the deeds of their aunt Princess Guantao (who gained favor with their father Emperor Jing by routinely procuring new concubines for him), had prepared a collection of young women to offer for her brother's concubinage to establish herself political leverage (girls from lowly background like Wei Zifu were however not considered). However, the plan did not work – all her candidates failed to impress the young emperor. Realizing her brother was disappointed and bored, the Princess called in her in-house dancers for entertainment. This time, Emperor Wu set his eyes on Wei Zifu and was immediately attracted by her beauty and grace. Taking the opportunity of visiting the restroom, the young emperor took advantage upon and consummated with the young singer, whom the observant Princess Pingyang had ordered to follow in and serve as a handmaid. Now excited over the romantic encounter, Emperor Wu immediately conferred a thousand sycees of gold to his sister as reward, who in turn offered the new girl to him as a gift. Emperor Wu then took Wei Zifu back to Chang'an, bringing along her younger half-brother Wei Qing as well to serve as a palace stableboy.

However, what Wei Zifu would later experience was far from a lovely Cinderella story. Upon hearing the arrival of the new girl, the extremely jealous and intolerant Empress Chen threw a tantrum and made sure Emperor Wu would abandon his idea of keeping Wei Zifu as a concubine. Wei Zifu was then demoted to an insignificant palace maid and was largely neglected. More than a year later, feeling hopeless with her life inside the palaces, Wei Zifu blended into a queue of palace maids waiting to be expelled (normally those who were too aged or incompetent in palace services) in the hope of getting out. Coincidentally, Emperor Wu happened to be there inspecting the expulsion process, and love soon re-flamed when he saw the tearful girl pleading to go home. By this point, Emperor Wu had just scored his first political victory with the successful intervention of Dong'ou and consolidated enough power, and thus no longer needed to appease Empress Chen and Princess Guantao. Wei Zifu was made to stay and fell pregnant very shortly later.

Wei Zifu's pregnancy was exciting news for Emperor Wu, who was upset over himself being blamed for Empress Chen's infertility. His throne was previously under threat due to his political clash with conservative factions led by his grandmother during the failed 140 BC reform, and many nobles schemed of deposing him under the excuse of "being incapable of fathering children" (the inability to propagate royal bloodline was a serious matter), and making his distant uncle Liu An the successor. This pregnancy cleared Emperor Wu's name and silenced his political enemies, and ensured Wei Zifu becoming favoured over Empress Chen.

Empress Chen became exceedingly jealous but could do little to Wei Zifu as she was under Emperor Wu's direct protection. Empress Chen's mother, Princess Guantao, then attempted retribution by kidnapping Wei Qing, who was then serving as a horseman in Jianzhang Camp (建章營, Emperor Wu's royal guards), and have him murdered. However, Wei Qing was rescued from the princess' estate by his friends – a group of fellow palace guards led by Gongsun Ao (公孫敖), who reported the entire incident to Emperor Wu. In response and as a sign of annoyance towards Empress Chen and her mother, Emperor Wu publicly made Wei Zifu a consort (夫人, a concubine position just beneath the Empress), and appointed Wei Qing the triple role of Chief of Jianzhang Camp (建章監), Chief of Staff (侍中) and Chief Councillor (太中大夫), effectively making him one of Emperor Wu's closest lieutenants. Consort Wei then went on to monopolize Emperor Wu's love for over a decade, and bore him three daughters.

In 130 BC, Empress Chen was found to have resorted to witchcraft to curse other concubines in attempt to restore her husband's love to her. Following an investigation/crackdown under the widely feared prosecutor Zhang Tang (張湯), which saw the execution of more than 300 people, Empress Chen was officially deposed for this misconduct against imperial moral standards, and exiled to the remote and lonely Long Gate Palace (長門宮), a suburban household that Princess Guantao once offered to Emperor Wu as a gift for tolerating her scandalous relationship with her godson Dong Yan (董偃).

== As Empress ==
The deposition of Empress Chen had left the position open, and Emperor Wu now had no official principal spouse. In 129 BC, Wei Qing, who was already a member of Emperor Wu's "insider circle" (內朝) of government officials, led an army of 10,000 cavalry and scored the first proper Han victory against the Xiongnu. The following year, Consort Wei gave birth to Emperor Wu's first son, Liu Ju, and the overjoyed Emperor Wu (who was already 28 years of age when the son was born) immediately made her empress later that year on 30 April. Liu Ju was later created crown prince on 1 June 122 BC.

After Wei Zifu became Empress, Wei Qing, now considered part of Emperor Wu's extended family, would be entrusted with more prominent roles in the war effort against Xiongnu, and was appointed the Generalissimo (大將軍) of All Armed Forces after his crushing victory over Xiongnu's Worthy Prince of the Right (右賢王) in 124 BC. Empress Wei's nephew Huo Qubing was also a distinguished military tactician with a series of highly successful campaigns over the control of the Hexi Corridor. By 123 BC, the Wei family had five marquesses and achieved top family honour, a remarkable feat for a clan from serf background.

Despite the fact that the rise of the Wei family largely owed credit to the military talent of Wei Qing and Huo Qubing, Wei Zifu was often seen as the backbone of the family. A contemporary folk song sang:

Nothing to be happy if you bore a son. Nothing to be angry if you bore a daughter. Don't you see Wei Zifu dominates the world!
生男無喜，生女無怒，獨不見衛子夫霸天下！

Because the great achievements of this Wei family, many later Han emperors considered marrying concubines with the surname Wei as a way of attaining good fortune.

During her tenure, Wei Zifu was recorded as a modest, careful and low-key empress, who tried her best to keep her clan members in line and out of trouble. The legendary historian Sima Qian, despite often displaying a sceptical and condescending attitude towards Emperor Wu's extended families, described Empress Wei as "fine in virtues" (嘉夫德若斯).

As the years went by, Emperor Wu's sexual attraction to Empress Wei faded and he began to favour other concubines, including Consort Wang (王夫人), Consort Li (李夫人) and Lady Zhao (趙婕妤, mother of Liu Fuling). However, he continued to respect Empress Wei's judgment and entrusted her to govern palaces affairs: Palaces of Changshen, Changle and Wayang, especially Shaofu (Emperor Wu's inner court who managed all military and state affairs and kept all war secrets and confidential government information), when he was absent from the capital, and assigned her son Crown Prince Liu Ju as the regent for all governmental and border affairs. Emperor Wu's trust in Empress Wei was such that when she wanted to inform him of important decisions to be made in the palaces during his absence, Emperor Wu received her reports verbally and most of the time refused to listen to them. He fully trusted Empress Wei's judgment on palaces' affairs.

Later on, civil unrest broke out between Consort Li's family and Wei Zifu's family, leading to Li's downfall and several of Li's relatives being executed.

== The Crown Prince revolt and death ==
In his advanced age, Emperor Wu became paranoid and suspicious over the possible use of witchcraft against him. A series of witchcraft persecutions would begin, and large numbers of people, many of whom were high officials and their families, were accused of witchcraft and executed, usually with their clans. Soon, these witchcraft persecutions would become intertwined in the succession struggles and erupt into a major catastrophe.

In 94 BC, Emperor Wu's youngest son Liu Fuling was born to Lady Zhao, and Emperor Wu was ecstatic in having a child at the advanced age of 62. Lady Zhao herself was introduced to Emperor Wu by some warlock, and was also known as "Consort Fist" (拳夫人) or "Consort Hook" (鉤弋夫人) due to legend that she was born with a contractured clenched fist, which somehow magically opened up when Emperor Wu massaged it, revealing a jade hook in her palm. Because her pregnancy with Liu Fuling purportedly lasted 14 months long – the same as the mythical Emperor Yao—Emperor Wu decided to name her household "Gate of Yao's Mother" (堯母門). This led to speculation that Emperor Wu wanted to get rid of the 38-year-old Liu Ju and replace him with the 3-year-old Liu Fuling as crown prince instead. While there was no evidence that Emperor Wu actually intended to do such a thing, over the next year conspiracies began against Crown Prince Liu Ju and Empress Wei .

One of the conspirators was Jiang Chong (江充), a high-ranking legal official known for his ruthlessness and opportunism. Jiang once had a run-in with Liu Ju after arresting one of the crown prince's assistants for improper use of an imperial road, and feared that Liu Ju would seek payback after ascending to the throne. Another conspirator was Emperor Wu's chief eunuch Su Wen (蘇文), who was in charge of managing Emperor Wu and Lady Zhao's living arrangements, and had previously tried to frame the Crown Prince by falsely accusing him of committing adultery with Emperor Wu's palace maids.

The first trial began in early 91 BC involving Prime Minister Gongsun Ao (Empress Wei's brother-in-law) and his son, leading to their unexplained suicide in jail and the execution of their clan. Liu Ju's sisters Princess Zhuyi and Princess Yangshi as well as cousin Wei Kang (衛伉, Wei Qing's eldest son) were also accused of involvement in witchcraft and executed, effectively removing almost all of his political allies in the Han court. With the sanctioned witch-hunts underway, Jiang Chong and Su Wen decided to strike while the iron was hot and move against Liu Ju, once again with the accusation of witchcraft. Because the physically deteriorating Emperor Wu was then staying at his summer palace in Ganquan (甘泉, in modern Xianyang, Shaanxi), he relied heavily on Jiang and Su for day-to-day information. Jiang, with the approval from Emperor Wu, searched through various palaces, planted voodoo dolls and pieces of cloth with mysterious writings in the house of the "perpetrators", then condemned the victims on the spot. Eventually he reached the palaces of Liu Ju and Empress Wei, engaged in so much digging that there were barely any space to lay a bed. He then announced that he found overwhelming evidence of crime particularly at the Crown Prince's household.

Liu Ju was shocked by this and forced to consult his close advisers. His teacher Shi De (石德), invoking the infamous story of Zhao Gao's scheme to murder Ying Fusu and raising the possibility that Emperor Wu might already be deceased, suggested to Liu Ju to start an uprising to get rid of the villains. Liu Ju initially hesitated and wanted to speedily proceed to Ganquan Palace and explain himself to his father, but when he found out that Jiang Chong's messengers were already on their way to report the false accusations, he decided to accept Shi's suggestion. He sent an individual to impersonate a messenger from Emperor Wu, and arrested Jiang and his co-conspirators – except for Su Wen, who escaped. He then denounced and personally executed Jiang, and reported his actions to his mother. Empress Wei, faced with the dilemma between her husband and son, chose to support her son and authorized Liu Ju to rally her palace guards and recruit civilian militias in preparation to defend himself against retaliation by the conspirators.

At the same time, Su Wen ran to Ganquan Palace and told Emperor Wu that the Crown Prince was committing treason. Emperor Wu, not believing it and correctly (at this point) concluding that Liu Ju were merely angry at Jiang Chong, send a messenger back to Chang'an to summon his son for an explanation. This messenger, a low-ranking eunuch, did not dare to proceed to the capital city, but instead returned and falsely reported to Emperor Wu that Liu Ju was going to kill him. By now enraged and really believing his son was going to overthrow him, Emperor Wu ordered his nephew, Prime Minister Liu Qumao (劉屈犛), to lead the regular Han army and put down the rebellion. The two forces then battled in the streets of Chang'an for five days, but Liu Qumao's forces prevailed after it became clear that Prince Ju did not have his father's authorization. Liu Ju was forced to flee the capital with two of his sons, and the rest of his family were killed, except a months-old grandson, Liu Bingyi, who was thrown into prison.

Shortly after Liu Ju's escape, Emperor Wu sent two officials to Empress Wei's palace to seize her seal (i.e. suspending her rights in preparation to depose her). Wei Zifu committed suicide in response, and was buried with a small coffin in Tongbai (桐柏) on the east side of an avenue outside Fu'ang Gate (覆盎門, the eastmost south gate of Chang'an). Most of her clan members were wiped out in the turmoil. Crown Prince Liu Ju was later tracked down and cornered in Hu County (湖縣) by local officials eager for rewards, and committed suicide when it became obvious he could not escape. His two sons were also killed.

== Posthumous rehabilitation ==
Not long afterwards, Emperor Wu began to realize that the witchcraft cases during 91 BC were often false accusations. In 89 BC, when Tian Qianqiu (田千秋), then the superintendent of Emperor Gao's temple, filed a report claiming that "a white-haired old man" told him in a dream that for the offense of armed uprising, Liu Ju would at most be caned, not killed, as a punishment, Emperor Wu had a revelation about what really happened. Furious over the realization that the conspirators exploited his trust and plotted his son's death, he had Su Wen burned alive, Jiang Chong's immediate and extended family executed, and killed every official promoted for tracking down the Crown Prince. He also promoted Tian Qianqiu to prime minister, and made major policy change rectifying the ideals supported by his dead son. To express his regret over causing his son's death, Emperor Wu also built the Palace of Son-Grieving (思子宮) and Platform of Longing for Return (歸來望思台), officially rehabilitating Liu Ju's name.

18 years after her death, her great-grandson Liu Bingyi ascended to the throne in 74 BC as Emperor Xuan. Emperor Xuan then had his great-grandmother's name officially cleared and rebuilt her tomb to a larger mausoleum cared by 1000 men, and gave her the posthumous title Wei Si Hou (衛思后, literally meaning "Wei the Thoughtful Empress"). Her new tomb, due to its remote location and relative humbleness, escaped the looting by tomb raiders later.

== Family ==
- Mother
  - Madame Wei (衛媪)
- Husband
  - Emperor Wu of Han
- Siblings
  - Wei Zhangjun (衛長君), eldest brother
  - Wei Junru (衛君孺), also known as Wei Ru (衛孺), later wife of Gongsun He (公孫賀), eldest sister
  - Wei Shao'er (衛少兒), mother of Huo Qubing, later wife of Chen Zhang (陳掌; great-grandson of Emperor Gaozu's adviser Chen Ping), elder sister
  - Wei Qing (衛青), born Zheng Qing (鄭青), Marquis of Changping (長平侯), Generalissimo (大將軍) of Han armies and Chief Defense Minister (大司馬), younger half-brother
  - Wei Bu (衛步), younger half-brother
  - Wei Guang (衛廣), younger half-brother
- Sister-in-law
  - Princess Pingyang (平陽公主), eldest sister of Emperor Wu, also known as Grand Princess Yangxin (陽信長公主) before her first marriage, later wife of Wei Qing
- Children
  - Grand Princess Wei (衛長公主), also known as Princess Dangli (當利公主)
  - Princess Zhuyi (諸邑公主), executed in 91 BC
  - Princess Shiyi (石邑公主), executed in 91 BC
  - Liu Ju (劉據), Crown Prince Wei (衛太子), heir apparent to Emperor Wu, committed suicide in 91 BC after being framed and forced into failed uprising, posthumously known as Crown Prince Li (戾太子)
- Nephews
  - Gongsun Jingsheng (公孫敬聲), executed in 91 BC, son of Wei Junru
  - Huo Qubing (霍去病), Marquis of Guanjun (冠軍侯), posthumously Marquis of Jingheng (景桓侯), son of Wei Shao'er
  - Wei Kang (衛伉), Marquis of Changping (長平侯), executed in 91 BC, son of Wei Qing
  - Wei Buyi (衛不疑), Marquis of Yin'an (陰安侯), son of Wei Qing
  - Wei Deng (衛登), Marquis of Fag'an (發乾侯), son of Wei Qing
- Grandchildren
  - Liu Jin (劉進), also known as Imperial Grandson Shi (史皇孫), executed in 91 BC, son of Liu Ju and father of Liu Bingyi
- Great-grandchildren
  - Liu Bingyi (劉病已), renamed Liu Xun (劉詢) after ascension to throne as Emperor Xuan of Han (91 BC – 49 BC), son of Liu Jin

== Popular culture ==
- Portrayed by Yu Xiaohui (于小慧) in the 1996 Chinese television series Emperor Wu of Han
- Portrayed by Wang Ling (王灵), Ning Jing (宁静) and Ru Ping (茹萍) in the first, second and third season of the television series The Prince of Han Dynasty (2001–2005).
- Portrayed by Lin Jing (林静) in the 2005 television series The Emperor in Han Dynasty.
- Portrayed by Zhang Meng (张檬) in the 2011 television series Beauty's Rival in Palace.
- Portrayed by Wang Luodan (王珞丹) in the 2014 television series The Virtuous Queen of Han.
- Portrayed by Maggie Cheung Ho-yee (张可颐) in the 2014 television series Sound of the Desert.
- Portrayed by Chen Zihan (陈紫函) in the 2017 television series The Fated General.

== Notes ==
Chinese royalty
Preceded by Empress Chen Jiao	Empress of the Western Han dynasty 30 Apr 128– 9 Sep 91 BC	Succeeded by Empress Shangguan
