= Wei Qing =

Han dynasty general

Marquess Changping Wei Qing
- 衛青

Grand Master of the Horse–Grand General
- In office 119 – 106 BC
- Monarch: Emperor Wu
- Succeeded by: Huo Guang

Grand General
- In office 124 – 119 BC
- Monarch: Emperor Wu
- Preceded by: Dou Ying
- Succeeded by: Wang Feng

General of Chariots and Cavalry
- In office 129 – 124 BC
- Monarch: Emperor Wu

Personal details
- Born: Zheng Qing (鄭青); Unknown Linfen, Shanxi
- Died: 106 BC Xi'an, Shaanxi
- Spouse: Grand Princess Yangxin
- Children: Wei Kang; Wei Buyi; Wei Deng
- Posthumous name: Marquess Lie (烈侯)

Military service
- Allegiance: Han
- Years of service: 129–119 BC
- Rank: Grand General
- Battles/wars: Han–Xiongnu Wars; Battle of Henan; Battle of Monan; Battle of Hexi; Battle of Mobei

Wei Qing (died c. Jun 106 BC?), courtesy name Zhongqing, born Zheng Qing in Linfen, Shanxi, was a Chinese military general and politician of the Western Han dynasty who was acclaimed for his campaigns against the Xiongnu, and his rags to riches life. He was a consort kin of Emperor Wu of Han as the younger half-brother of Emperor Wu's wife Empress Wei Zifu, and later the third husband of Emperor Wu's older sister Eldest Princess Yangxin. He was also the maternal uncle of Huo Qubing, another decorated Han general who participated in the war against the Xiongnu.

== Early life ==
Wei Qing was born from humble means as a bastard child from a serf family. His father Zheng Ji (鄭季) was a low-level official for Pingyang County (平陽縣, in modern Linfen, Shanxi) and was commissioned to serve at the estate of Cao Shou (曹壽), the Marquess of Pingyang (平陽侯), and his wife Princess Pingyang (平陽公主, Emperor Wu's older sister). There, Zheng met and had an extramarital affair with a lowly female servant known as Wei Ao (衛媪, literally means "the Wei woman"), and their relationship produced a son named Zheng Qing. The child was initially sent to live in his father's household as his serf mother (who was already raising four other children) could not afford to raise him in poverty, but due to the illegitimacy of his birth, the young boy was detested and mistreated by his father and step-family, and was made to live as a lowly sheepherder. Unable to tolerate the abuse, Zheng Qing eventually ran away back to his mother's side during his early teenage years, and served as a stableboy in the marquess's estate of Pingyang. He then severed his paternal bond by adopting the surname "Wei" of his mother's family.

== Early career ==
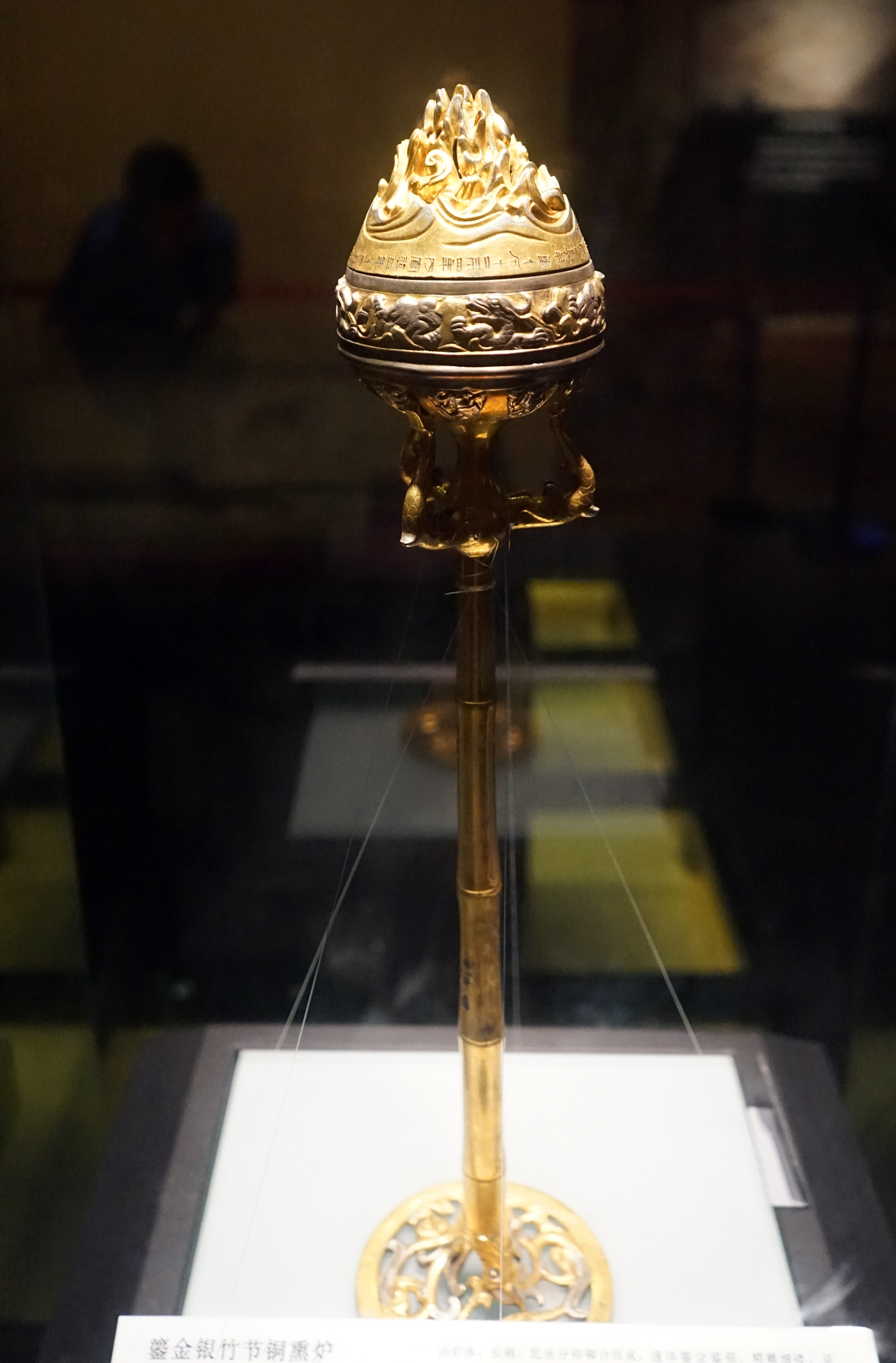
A gold-plated hill censer in Shaanxi History Museum. The inscriptions on it suggest that it was collected by Emperor Wu, later was bestowed to Wei Qing's wife, Eldest Princess Yangxin.

Legend says that Wei Qing once followed his master on a visit to Ganquan Palace (甘泉宮) and encountered a cangued prisoner, who foretold that it would be Wei Qing's fate to achieve nobility and marquisate, a prediction Wei Qing simply dismissed as a joke, citing that not getting caned would be fortunate enough for someone living the life of a serf.

After Princess Pingyang offered the singer Wei Zifu to Emperor Wu as a concubine c. 139 BC, Wei Qing followed as an accompanying gift and served as a horseman at Jianzhang Camp (建章營, Emperor Wu's Royal Guards). However, as his sister gained the Emperor's love and fell pregnant, near-disaster would befall Wei Qing. The powerful Grand Princess Guantao (館陶長公主) Liu Piao (劉嫖), the mother of Empress Chen Jiao, angry that Wei Zifu had siphoned off the imperial favor from her daughter, kidnapped Wei Qing and wanted to kill him privately as retaliation. However, Wei was rescued at the last moment by his friends, a group of fellow palace guards led by Gongsun Ao (公孫敖). In response to the incident and as a sign of annoyance towards Empress Chen and her mother, Emperor Wu appointed Wei Qing the triple role of Chief of Jianzhang Camp (建章監, equivalent to a chief security officer), Palace Attendant (侍中) and Chief Councillor (太中大夫), effectively making him one of Emperor Wu's closest lieutenants. He also publicly made Wei Zifu a consort (夫人, a concubine position lower only to the Empress), and rewarded other members of her family. This marked the beginning of the rise of one of the most influential clans in the political history of Western Han – the Wei/Huo family.

Great wealth would not be all Wei Qing would have. Emperor Wu saw many qualities in him: great horsemanship, archery, bravery, and tactical intuition, as well as excellent leadership skills. Over the next several years, Wei Qing would be entrusted as Emperor Wu's most loyal consul, as his sister also monopolized the Emperor's love for the next decade.

== Military campaigns ==
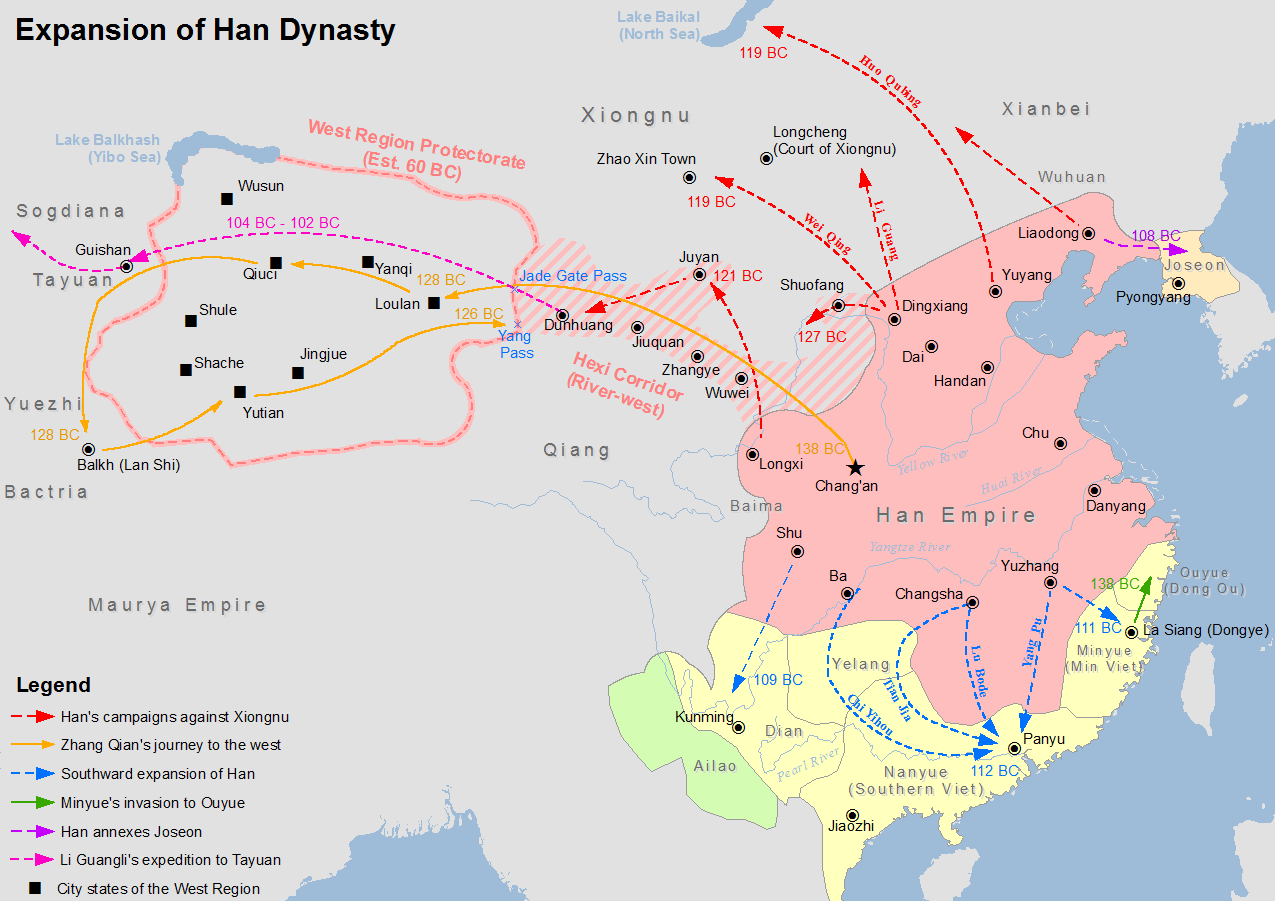
Expansion of Han dynasty. Wei Qing's campaigns against Xiongnu are shown in red arrows.

In 129 BC, Xiongnu attacked the Shanggu Commandery (上谷郡, roughly modern-day Zhangjiakou, Hebei). Emperor Wu promoted Wei Qing as the General of Chariots and Cavalry (車騎將軍) and dispatched him with Gongsun Ao, Gongsun He (公孫賀), and Li Guang in four separate columns against Xiongnu, each leading 10,000 cavalry. Li Guang (the most seasoned commander out of the four) and Gongsun Ao suffered major losses at the Xiongnus' hand, while Gongsun He failed to encounter and engage any enemy. Wei Qing, the least experienced out of the four, distinguished himself with a successful long-distance raid of the Xiongnu's holy site Longcheng (龍城), killing over 700 Xiongnu soldiers in the process. As a reward for the victory (the first proper victory against Xiongnu in Han history), Wei Qing was promoted to a higher command and created an acting Marquess in the Pass (關內侯), with a march of several hundred households.

In 128 BC, Consort Wei Zifu gave birth to Emperor Wu's first son, Liu Ju, and was created Empress very soon after. Later that year, Wei Qing, who was now officially a trusted member of Emperor's extended family, led 30,000 cavalry from Shanwu (near present-day Youyuxian, Shanxi) in Yanmen Commandery, killing thousands of Xiongnu soldiers.

In 127 BC, Wei Qing led a 40,000-strong cavalry from Yunzhong Commandery (雲中郡, modern-day Togtoh County, Inner Mongolia), then maneuver to Gaoque (高闕, modern-day Urad Rear Banner) to Longxi region (modern-day Gansu), and totally outflanking and surrounding the forces of Xiongnu's Princes of Loufan (樓煩王) and Baiyang (白羊王), killing 2,300 and capturing 3,017 Xiongnu soldiers as well as over a million cattle. According to record from Shiji and Hanshu, the battle was so swift and one-sided that the Han forces "returned with all warriors intact" (全甲兵而還), implying a near-zero casualty rate. This earned Wei Qing a further promotion to the Marquess Changping (長平侯), with a march of 3,800 households. His subordinates Su Jian (蘇建, father of the great Han patriot Su Wu) and Zhang Cigong (張次公) were also created marquesses. The Han recapture of this territory forced the two Xiongnu tribes to withdraw from the fertile Hetao region (the Ordos steppe), and dealt devastating blow to their economy. The city of Shuofang (朔方城) was built, and later became a key stronghold for offensive and defensive campaigns against Xiongnu.

In 124 BC, Wei Qing would be the vital part of the greatest Han victory over Xiongnu to date. When Xiongnu's Right Worthy Prince (右賢王) made harassing raids against outskirts of Shuofang, Wei Qing launched a crushing long-distance night assault from Gaoque with 30,000 cavalrymen, completely surprising and surrounding the Worthy Prince's main camp. Not only did the Han forces send the Worthy Prince running for his life from his drunken slumber (with only his own concubine following), they also took about 15,000 captives, among them a dozen Xiongnu nobles, and millions of cattle. For this victory, Wei Qing was made the "Grand General" (大將軍) of All Armed Forces, and his march was enlarged by 8,700 households. His three young sons Wei Kang (衛伉), Wei Buyi (衛不疑), and Wei Deng (衛登) were also made marquesses (an offer later refused by Wei Qing), as well as seven generals under his command.

In 123 BC, Wei Qing set off from Dingxiang (定襄) and returned with several thousand enemy kills. A month later, Wei Qing again launched from Dingxiang, but would fight a relatively inconclusive battle. Although he was able to kill/capture more than 10,000 Xiongnu soldiers, part of his vanguard forces, a 3,000-strong regiment commanded by generals Su Jian and Zhao Xin (a surrendered Xiongnu prince), encountered a Xiongnu force led by Chanyu Yizhixie (伊稚斜單于), and was outnumbered and annihilated. Zhao Xin defected on the field with his 800 ethnic Xiongnu subordinates, while Su Jian escaped after losing all his men in the desperate fighting. Showing compassion on Su Jian, Wei Qing spared him even though some advocates advised him to execute Su on the spot after court martial to enforce his commanding authority. Due to the loss of Su's detachment, Wei Qing troops did not earn any promotion, even though they scored more gains than losses. At this campaign, his nephew Huo Qubing distinguished himself in battle and was given his own command.

== Battle of Mobei ==
After Huo Qubing's successful campaigns in the Hexi Corridor, Xiongnu strategically retreated to north of the Gobi Desert, as the barren lands would serve as a natural barrier that was very difficult to overcome for the Han forces. However, in 119 BC, Emperor Wu decided to defy the odds and launched a massive expeditionary campaign across the desert. In this engagement, Emperor Wu broke the normal pattern of reaction against Xiongnu attacks by making a major excursion against Xiongnu's headquarters in the north of the Gobi Desert. This is known to history as the Mobei Campaign ("campaign of the desert's north"). Wei Qing and Huo Qubing were in command of the two main corps, each with 50,000 cavalrymen and 100,000 infantrymen/charioteers.

Under Wei Qing's command were four other generals, namely Gongsun He, Zhao Yiji (趙食其), Cao Xiang (曹襄) and an elderly but very enthusiastic Li Guang. Contrary to the arrangements promised to Li Guang by Emperor Wu (where he would command the vanguard), Emperor Wu secretly told Wei Qing not to assign Li Guang to crucial missions due to Li's infamous history of "bad lucks". Wei Qing, after the army had already departed, merged Li Guang's forces with Zhao Yiji's and ordered them to take an eastern flanking route through a barren region. According to the historian Sima Qian, Wei Qing had done this to give his old friend Gongsun Ao, who had recently been stripped of his title, a chance to win a major battle and be re-promoted. However, sending Generals of Front (前將軍, namely Li Guang) and Right (右將軍, namely Zhao Yiji) on flanking maneuvers was one of Wei Qing's typical tactical arrangements. This was evidenced by his previous deployment of Zhao Xin and Su Jian, who were Generals of Front and Right respectively, during the less successful 123 BC campaign.

After crossing the desert, Wei Qing's army unexpectedly encountered Chanyu Yizhixie's main forces, who was waiting in anticipation of ambushing the Han army. Despite being significantly outnumbered as well as fatigued after the long journey, Wei Qing was able to counter Xiongnu's cavalry charge with archery defense created by heavy-armored chariots arranged in ring formations, which was reinforced with cavalry counteroffensives. (This defense would be evaluated as one of the most effective against cavalry by many later Chinese tacticians, including Yue Fei.) The Han forces successfully enforced a stalemate that lasted until dusk, when a sandstorm descended upon the battlefield. Seizing the moment of poor visibility provided by the dust, Wei Qing broke the stalemate and launched bilateral flanking attacks with his cavalries. Already exhausted after a day of unsuccessful attacks against Han positions, the sudden sight of incoming Han soldiers in the darkness further broke the Xiongnu's morale, routing them. This decisive pincer attack shattered the Chanyu's line, nearly capturing him and completely overrunning his forces, killing over 10,000 Xiongnu soldiers in the process. The Han army pursued all the way to the modern Ulaanbaatar region, destroying the Xiongnu stronghold Zhao Xin Castle (趙信城) before returning in triumph with a total of about 19,000 enemy kills. Chanyu Yizhixie was forced to escape with very few men, lost communication with his tribe for days, and did not return until his clan presumed his death and installed a new Chanyu. This was a narrow but critically significant victory for the Han empire. Xiongnu was greatly weakened to the point that they would huddle up into the barren northern Gobi desert (leading to decline of their population), and unable to raid south for the next decade. The next major Xiongnu invasion did not occur until after the Han dynasty collapsed, some 400 years later during the Jin dynasty.

=== Li Gan incident ===
While Wei Qing's main force was engaging Yizhixie Chanyu, the flanking division led by Li Guang and Zhao Yiji got lost in the desert and failed to reach the battlefield in time, despite meeting little Xiongnu resistance. They only rendezvous with Wei Qing's troops after the latter already returned from Zhao Xin Castle. Both men were later summoned for court martial to explain the failure to accomplish orders and thus jeopardize the whole campaign. Feeling humiliated over the charges against him and frustrated over missing his final chance at martial glory, Li Guang committed honor suicide rather than to face the court. Many people, including the historian Sima Qian, thus blamed Wei Qing for causing Li Guang's death. Li's youngest son Li Gan (李敢), who was a subordinate of Huo Qubing at the time, later went to Wei Qing's home and assaulted him. Although Wei Qing decided to cool the heat and mercifully let the matter slide, Huo Qubing was greatly angered that his subordinate had the temerity to insult his uncle. He personally shot dead Li Gan during a hunting trip.

== Late career and death ==
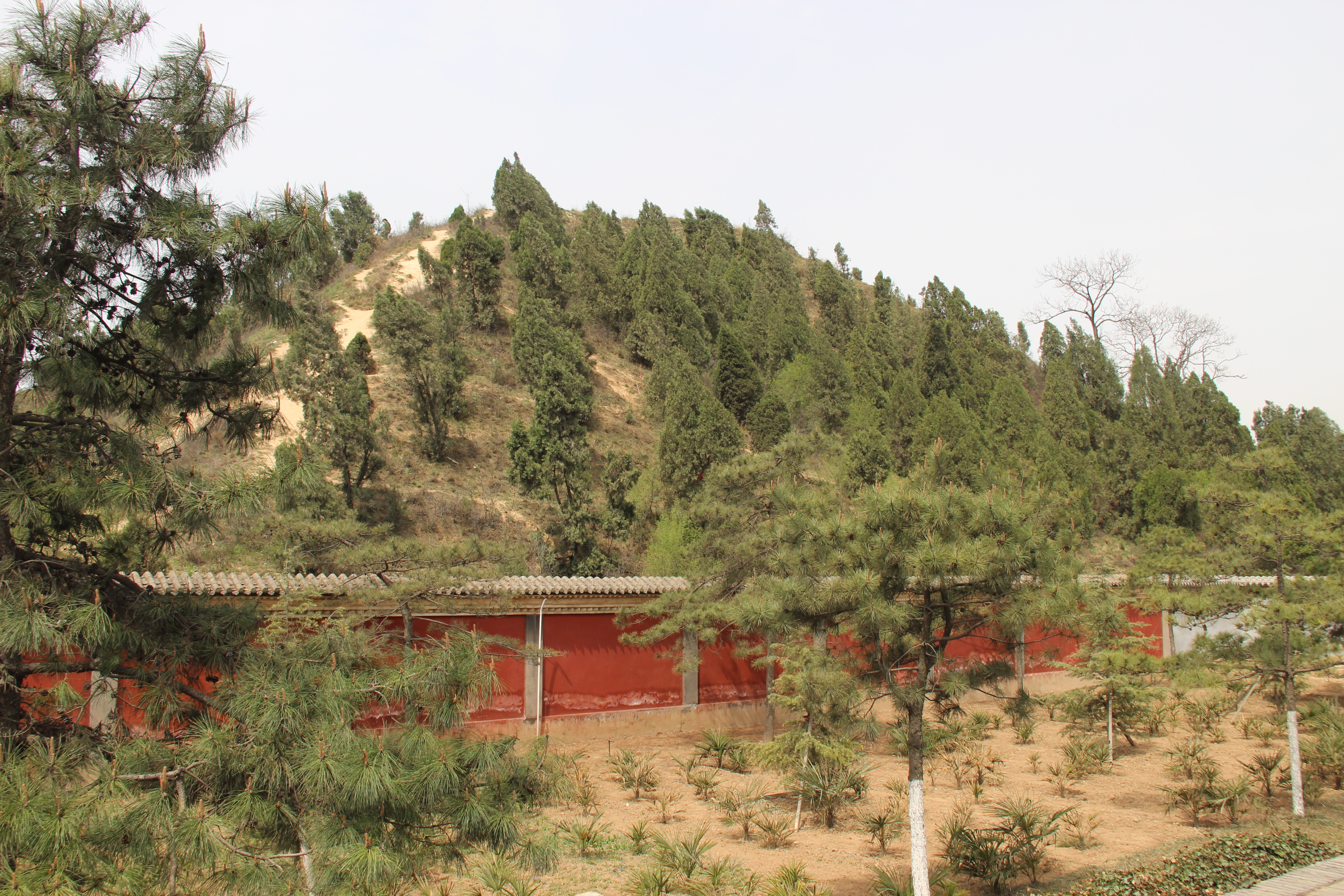
Tomb of Wei Qing (34.341728°N 108.580145°E), seen from the tomb of Huo Qubing. Maoling, Xingping, Shaanxi.

After the 119 BC campaign, Wei Qing would see little combat action himself, largely remaining in the capital of Chang'an to advise on military and sometimes political matters as the dual-role of "Grand Master of the Horse–Grand General" (大司馬大將軍). He also assisted his nephew, Crown prince-regent Liu Ju, when Emperor Wu was away on official tours.

Despite his great honor and power, Wei Qing remained humble in many ways. Because of the great favor Emperor Wu showed him, all of the other officials at court flattered him, except for Ji An (汲黯), who treated him as an equal. Wei was impressed by Ji's integrity in face of pressure and respected Ji greatly, often requesting Ji's opinion on important matters. Throughout his career, he refused to hire scholars to praise him and create favorable public opinions, and tried to maintain a relatively low profile. Despite his humble way of life, Wei's status in the Han army made him a distinguished figure in the country, attracting admiration, jealousy and hostility alike. Emperor Wu's uncle, the Prince of Huainan Liu An, who had been conspiring a military coup for a long time, saw Wei Qing as his prime political obstacle that must be removed.

Wei Qing died in 106 BC and was buried in a large tomb built to the model of Mount Lu (盧山, a mountain previously in Xiongnu-occupied territory). The tomb was connected to that of his nephew Huo Qubing, who had died in 117 BC, and the future tomb for Emperor Wu. Wei Qing would not live to see the destruction of his clan – nobody survived except his youngest son Wei Deng (衛登) and his great-grandnephew Liu Bingyi, as well as the tragic fate of his sister Empress Wei and nephew Liu Ju, during the political turmoil in 91 BC.

== Family ==
- Mother
  - Madam Wei (衛媪)
- Father
  - Zheng Ji (鄭季)
- Siblings
  - Wei Zhangjun (衛長君), eldest half-brother
  - Wei Junru (衛君孺), also known as Wei Ru (衛孺), eldest half-sister, later wife of Gongsun He (公孫賀)
  - Wei Shaoer (衛少兒), mother of Huo Qubing, older half-sister, later wife of Chen Zhang (陳掌, a great-grandson of Emperor Gaozu's adviser Chen Ping)
  - Wei Zifu (衛子夫), mother of Liu Ju, youngest older half-sister, empress to Emperor Wu of Han, committed suicide 91 BC, posthumously Wei Si Hou (衛思后)
  - Wei Bu (衛步), younger half-brother
  - Wei Guang (衛廣), younger half-brother
- Wife
  - Princess Pingyang (平陽公主), eldest sister of Emperor Wu
- Children
  - Wei Kang (衛伉), Marquess of Changping (長平侯), executed in 91 BC
  - Wei Buyi (衛不疑), Marquess of Yin'an (陰安侯)
  - Wei Deng (衛登), Marquess of Fagan (發干侯)
- Nephews
  - Gongsun Jingsheng (公孫敬聲), son of Wei Junru, executed in 91 BC
  - Huo Qubing (霍去病), son of Wei Shao'er
  - Liu Ju (劉據), son of Wei Zifu, eldest son and heir apparent to Emperor Wu, committed suicide 91 BC after failed uprising
- Nieces
  - Grand Princess Wei (衛長公主), also known as Princess Dangli (當利公主)
  - Princess Zhuyi (諸邑公主, executed 91 BC)
  - Princess Yangshi (陽石公主, executed 91 BC)
