= Xiongnu =

Eurasian steppe confederation and empire

- 3rd century BC–2nd century AD
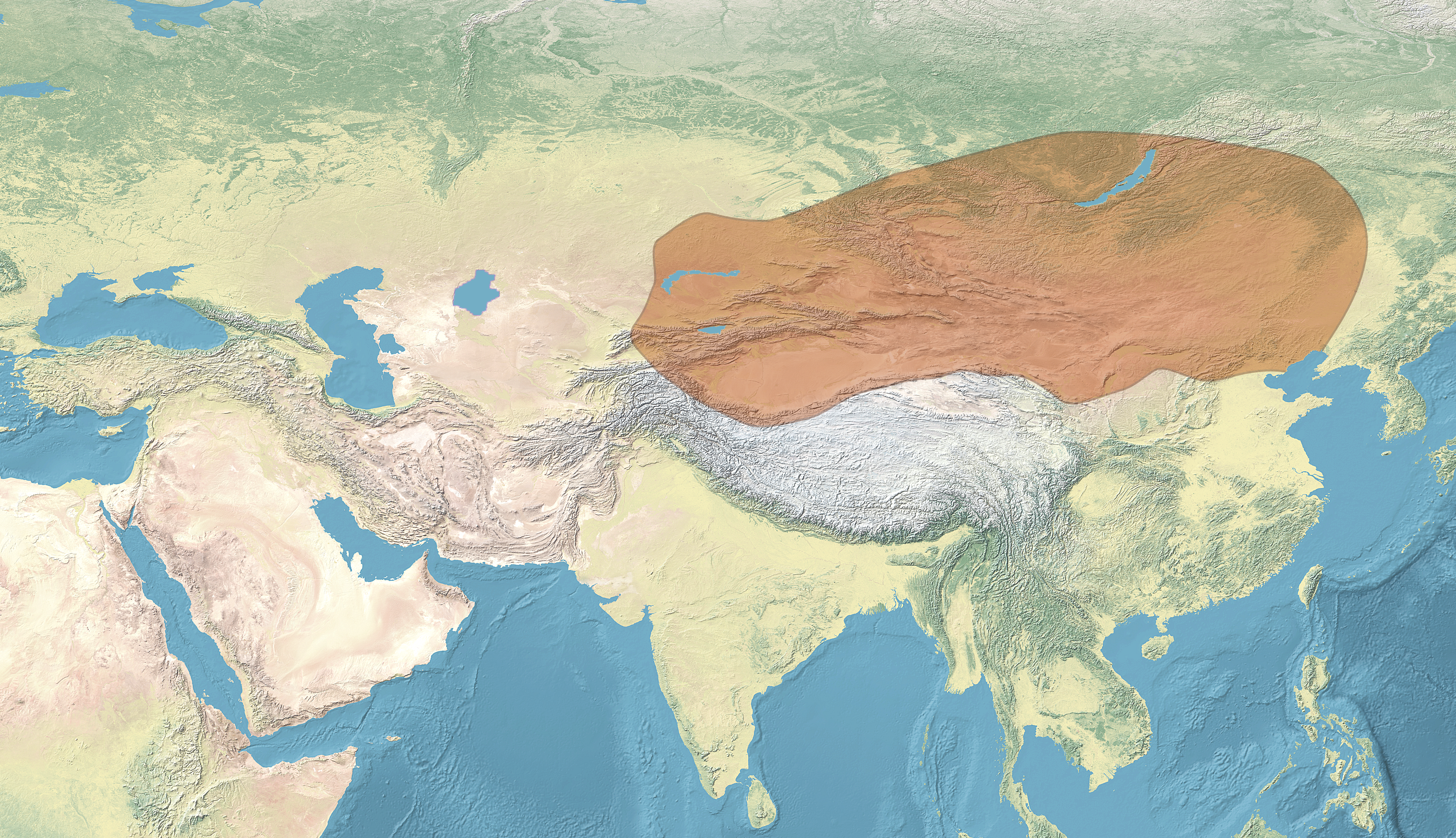
- Territory of the Xiongnu in the 2nd century BC (before the Han–Xiongnu wars of 133 BC – 89 AD): it included Mongolia, east Kazakhstan, east Kyrgyzstan, south Siberia, and parts of northern China such as western Manchuria, Xinjiang, Inner Mongolia and Gansu
- Capital: Longcheng
- Common languages: various
- Religion: Shamanism, Tengrism, Buddhism
- Demonym: Xiongnu
- Government: Tribal confederation
- Chanyu
  - 220–209 BC: Touman
  - 209–174 BC: Modu
  - 174–161 BC: Laoshang
  - 46 AD: Wudadihou
- Historical era: Antiquity
  - Established: 3rd century BC
  - Disestablished: 2nd century AD
Preceded by
Slab-grave culture
Donghu people
Yuezhi
Saka
Ordos culture
Succeeded by
Han dynasty
Xianbei
Rouran Khaganate
Tocharians
First Turkic Khaganate

Xiongnu
- Chinese: 匈奴
Transcriptions
Standard Mandarin
- Hanyu Pinyin: Xiōngnú
- Bopomofo: ㄒㄩㄥ ㄋㄨˊ
- Gwoyeu Romatzyh: Shiongnu
- Wade–Giles: Hsiung^{1}-nu^{2}
- Tongyong Pinyin: Syong-nú
- IPA: [ɕjʊ́ŋ.nǔ]
Wu
- Wugniu: shion^{1} nu^{2}
- IPA: Shanghainese: [ɕioŋ˥ nu˧]
Yue: Cantonese
- Yale Romanization: Hūng-nòuh
- Jyutping: hung^{1} nou^{4}
- IPA: [hʊŋ˥.nɔw˩]
Southern Min
- Tâi-lô: Hing-lôo
Middle Chinese
- Middle Chinese: xjowng nu (Baxter)
Old Chinese
- Baxter–Sagart (2014): *qʰoŋ.nˤa
- Zhengzhang: qʰoŋ.na:

The Xiongnu (Chinese: 匈奴; [ɕjʊ́ŋ.nǔ]) were a tribal confederation of nomadic peoples who, according to ancient Chinese sources, inhabited the eastern Eurasian Steppe from the 3rd century BC to the late 1st century AD. Modu Chanyu, the supreme leader after 209 BC, founded the Xiongnu Empire.

After overthrowing their previous overlords, the Yuezhi, the Xiongnu became the dominant power on the steppes of East Asia, centred on the Mongolian Plateau. The Xiongnu were also active in areas now part of Siberia, Inner Mongolia, Gansu and Xinjiang. Their relations with the Chinese dynasties to the south-east were complex, alternating between various periods of peace, war and subjugation. Ultimately, the Xiongnu were defeated by the Han dynasty in a centuries-long conflict, which led to the confederation splitting in two, and forcible resettlement of large numbers of Xiongnu within Han borders.

After their surrender, the Xiongnu in China intermixed with the Han Chinese and other surrounding ethnic minority groups. They were known as one of the "Five Barbarians", as their descendants founded the short-lived dynastic states of Han-Zhao, Xia and Northern Liang in northern China during the Sixteen Kingdoms period. The Jie people, who led the Later Zhao, were also derived from the Xiongnu, as were the Xianbei Yuwen clan of the Northern Zhou during the Northern and Southern dynasties. By the 7th century, the Xiongnu had completely integrated into Chinese society.

Attempts to associate the Xiongnu with the nearby Iranian Saka and Sarmatians were once controversial. However, archaeogenetics has confirmed their interaction with the Xiongnu, and also possibly their relation to the Huns. The identity of the ethnic core of Xiongnu has been a subject of varied hypotheses, because only a few words, mainly titles and personal names, were preserved in the Chinese sources. The name Xiongnu may be cognate with that of the Huns or the Huna, although this is disputed. Other linguistic links—all of them also controversial—proposed by scholars include Turkic, Iranian, Mongolic, Uralic, Yeniseian, or multi-ethnic.

== Name ==
The word "Xiōngnú" means "fierce slave". They were identified by the Han Chinese as invaders from the north who rode on horseback. The pronunciation of 匈奴 as Xiōngnú [ɕjʊ́ŋnǔ] is the modern Mandarin Chinese pronunciation, from the Mandarin dialect spoken now in Beijing, which came into existence only in the second millennium CE. The Old Chinese pronunciation has been reconstructed as *xiuoŋ-na or as *qhoŋna according to Wang Li and Zhengzhang Shangfang respectively, the two most widely recognized Old Chinese reconstructions in China. Sinologist Axel Schuessler (2014) reconstructs the pronunciations of 匈奴 as *hoŋ-nâ in Late Old Chinese (c. 318 BC) and as *hɨoŋ-nɑ in Eastern Han Chinese; citing other Chinese transcriptions wherein the velar nasal medial -ŋ-, after a short vowel, seemingly played the role of a general nasal – sometimes equivalent to n or m –, Schuessler proposes that 匈奴 Xiongnu < *hɨoŋ-nɑ < *hoŋ-nâ might be a Chinese rendition, Han or even pre-Han, of foreign *Hŏna or *Hŭna, which Schuessler compares to Huns and Sanskrit Hūṇā. However, the same medial -ŋ- prompts Christopher P. Atwood (2015) to reconstruct *Xoŋai, which he derives from the Ongi River (Mongolian: Онги гол) in Mongolia and suggests that it was originally a dynastic name rather than an ethnic name.

== History ==
=== Predecessors ===
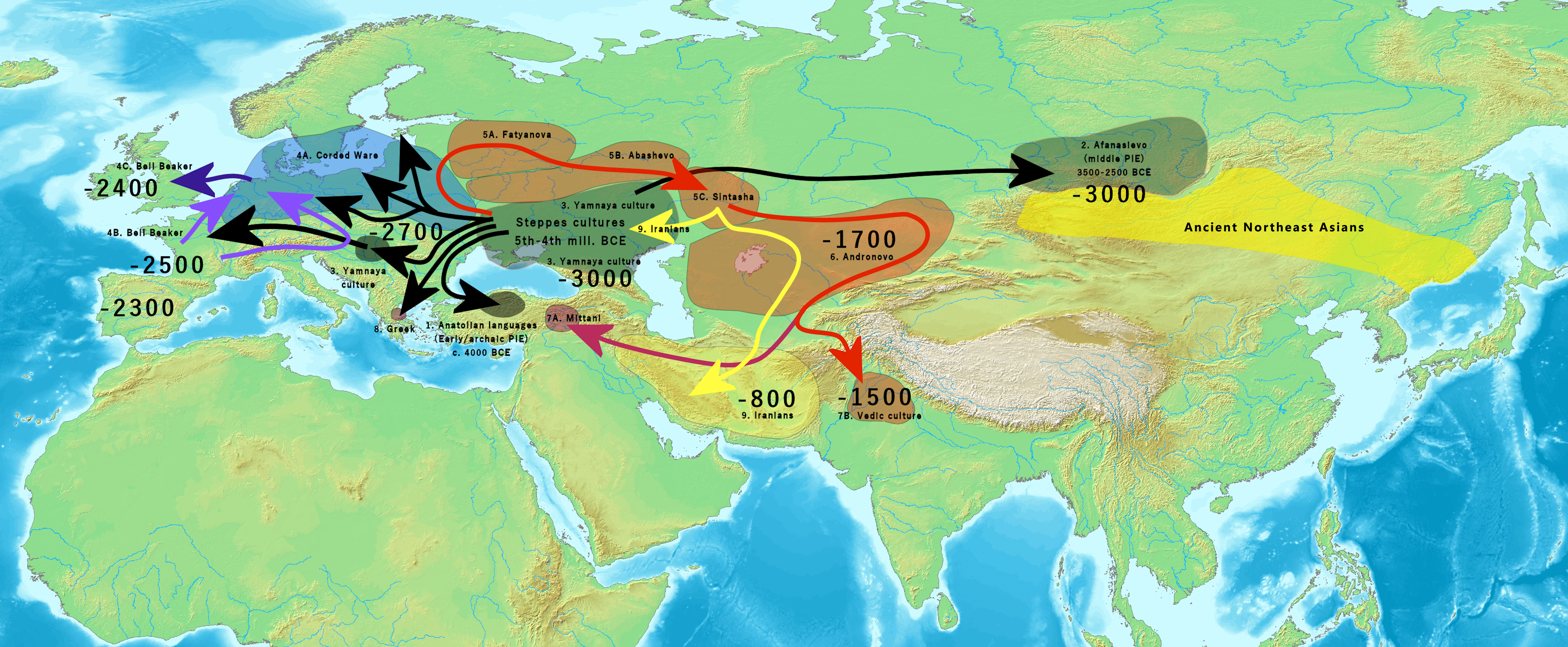
Early Indo-European migrations from the Pontic steppes and across Central Asia, and encounter with Ancient Northeast Asian populations

The territories associated with the Xiongnu in central/east Mongolia were previously inhabited by the Slab Grave Culture (Ancient Northeast Asian origin), which persisted until the 3rd century BC. Genetic research indicates that the Slab Grave people were the primary ancestors of the Xiongnu, and that the Xiongnu formed through substantial and complex mixture with West Eurasians.

During the Western Zhou (1045–771 BC), there were numerous conflicts with nomadic tribes from the north and the northwest, variously known as the Xianyun, Guifang, or various "Rong" tribes, such as the Xirong, Shanrong or Quanrong. These tribes are recorded as harassing Zhou territory, but at the time the Zhou were expanding northwards, encroaching on their traditional lands, especially into the Wei River valley. Archaeologically, the Zhou expanded to the north and the northwest at the expense of the Siwa culture. The Quanrong put an end to the Western Zhou in 771 BC, sacking the Zhou capital of Haojing and killing the last Western Zhou king You. Thereafter the task of dealing with the northern tribes was left to their vassal, the Qin state.

To the west, the Pazyryk culture (6th – 3rd century BC) immediately preceded the formation of the Xiongnus. A Scythian culture, it was identified by excavated artifacts and mummified humans, such as the Siberian Ice Maiden, found in the Siberian permafrost, in the Altai Mountains, Kazakhstan and nearby Mongolia. To the south, the Ordos culture had developed in the Ordos Loop (modern Inner Mongolia, China) during the Bronze and early Iron Age from the 6th to 2nd centuries BC. Of unknown ethno-linguistic origin, it is thought to represent the easternmost extension of Indo-European-speakers. The Yuezhi were displaced by the Xiongnu expansion in the 2nd century BC, and had to migrate to Central and Southern Asia.

=== Early history ===
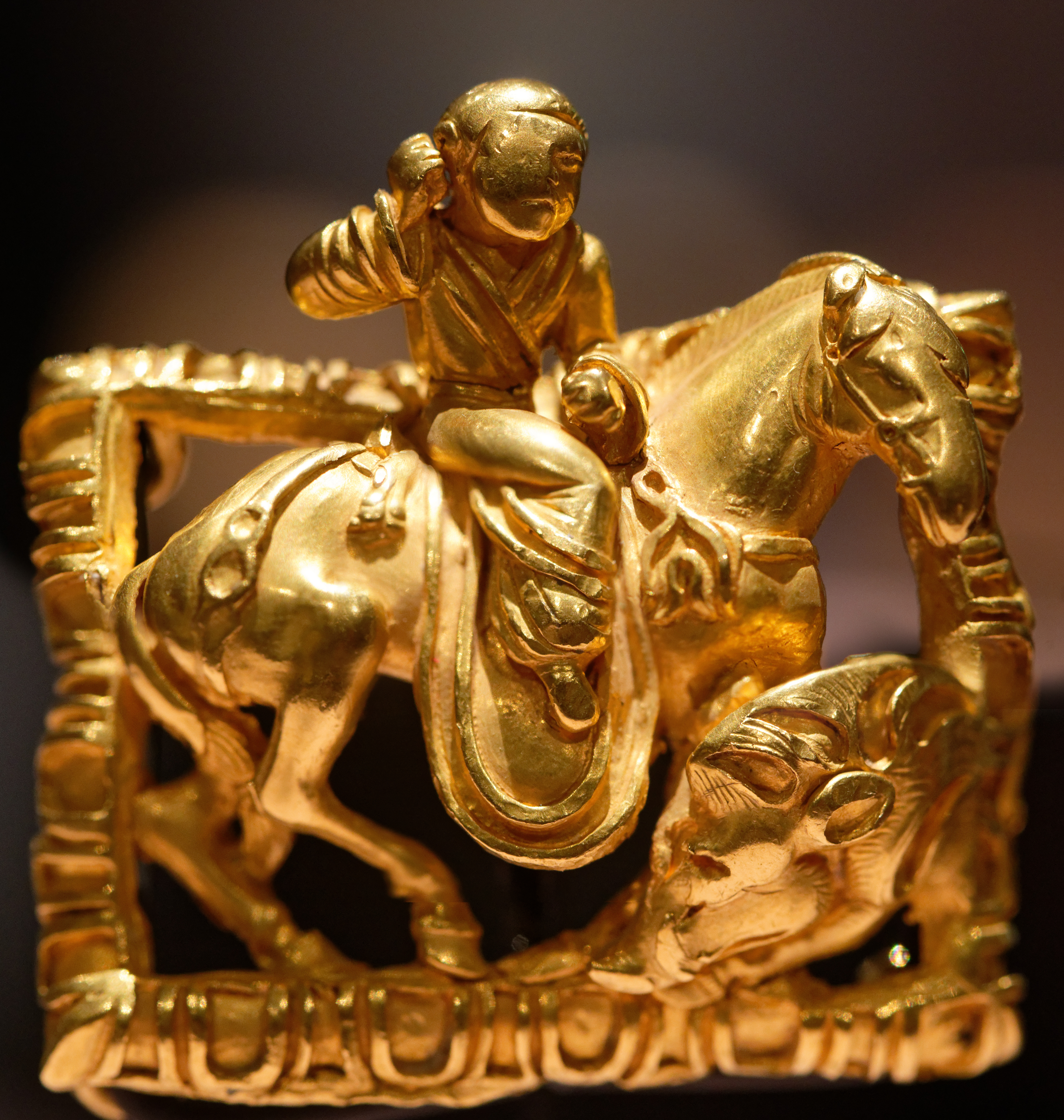
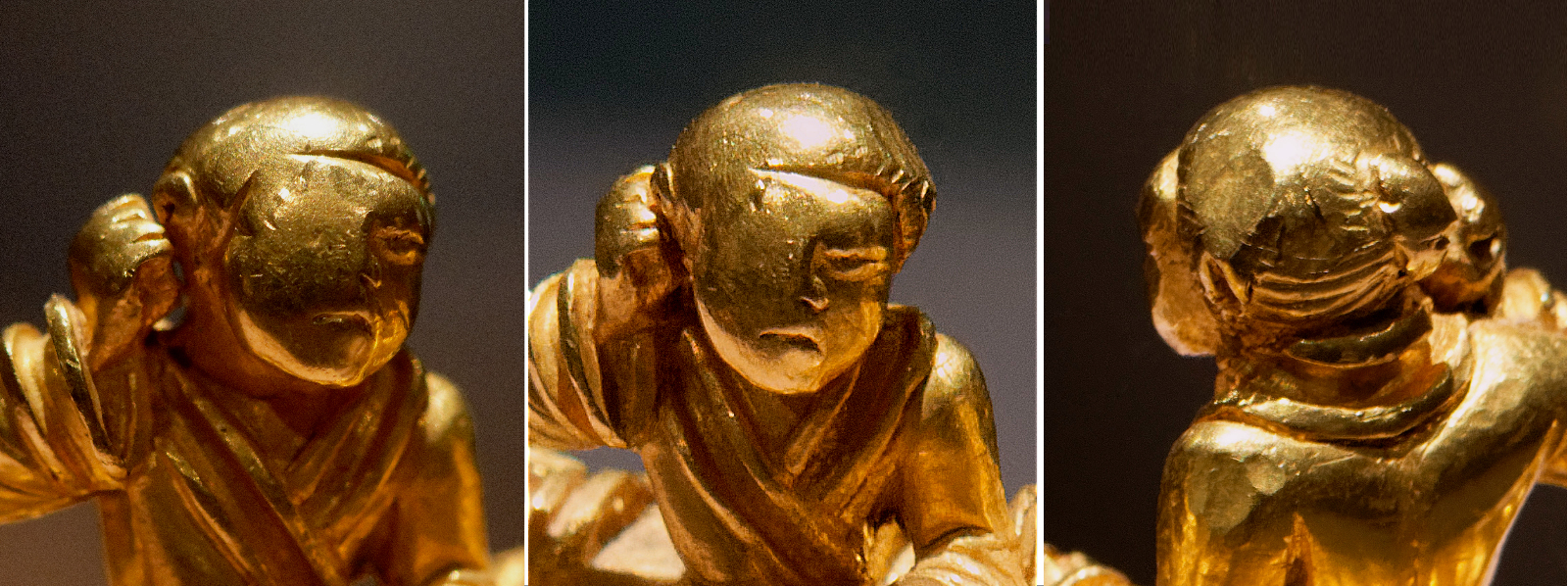
A nomad horseman spearing a boar, discovered in Saksanokhur, South Tajikistan, 1st–2nd century AD. According to Francfort, this decorative belt buckle may have been made for a patron related to the Xiongnu, and may be dated to the 2nd-1st century BC. The rider wears the steppe dress, his hair is tied into a hairbun characteristic of the oriental steppes, and his horse has characteristically Xiongnu horse trappings.

Western Han historian Sima Qian composed an early yet detailed exposition on the Xiongnu in one liezhuan (arrayed account) of his Records of the Grand Historian (c. 100 BC), wherein the Xiongnu were alleged to be descendants of a certain Chunwei, who in turn descended from the "lineage of Lord Xia", a.k.a. Yu the Great. Even so, Sima Qian also drew a distinct line between the settled Huaxia people (Han) to the pastoral nomads (Xiongnu), characterizing them as two polar groups in the sense of a civilization versus an uncivilized society: the Hua–Yi distinction. Sima Qian also mentioned Xiongnu's early appearance north of Wild Goose Gate and Dai commanderies before 265 BC, just before the Zhao-Xiongnu War; however, sinologist Edwin Pulleyblank (1994) contends that pre-241-BC references to the Xiongnu are anachronistic substitutions for the Hu people instead. Sometimes the Xiongnu were distinguished from other nomadic peoples; namely, the Hu people; yet on other occasions, Chinese sources often just classified the Xiongnu as a Hu people, which was a blanket term for nomadic people. Even Sima Qian was inconsistent: in the chapter "Hereditary House of Zhao", he considered the Donghu to be the Hu proper, yet elsewhere he considered Xiongnu to be also Hu.

Ancient China often came in contact with the Xianyun and the Xirong nomadic peoples. In later Chinese historiography, some groups of these peoples were believed to be the possible progenitors of the Xiongnu people. These nomadic people often had repeated military confrontations with the Shang and especially the Zhou, who often conquered and enslaved the nomads in an expansion drift. During the Warring States period, the armies from the Qin, Zhao and Yan states were encroaching and conquering various nomadic territories that were inhabited by the Xiongnu and other Hu peoples.

Pulleyblank argued that the Xiongnu were part of a Xirong group called Yiqu, who had lived in Shaanbei and had been influenced by China for centuries, before they were driven out by the Qin dynasty. Qin's campaign against the Xiongnu expanded Qin's territory at the expense of the Xiongnu. After the unification of Qin dynasty, Xiongnu was a threat to the northern border of Qin. They were likely to attack the Qin dynasty when they suffered natural disasters.

=== State formation ===
The first known Xiongnu leader was Touman, who reigned between 220 and 209 BC. In 215 BC, Chinese Emperor Qin Shi Huang sent General Meng Tian on a military campaign against the Xiongnu. Meng Tian defeated the Xiongnu and expelled them from the Ordos Loop, forcing Touman and the Xiongnu to flee north into the Mongolian Plateau. In 210 BC, Meng Tian died, and in 209 BC, Touman's son Modu became the Xiongnu chanyu.

In order to protect the Xiongnu from the threat of the Qin dynasty, Modu Chanyu united the Xiongnu into a powerful confederation. This transformed the Xiongnu into a more formidable polity, able to form larger armies and exercise improved strategic coordination. The Qin dynasty fell in 207 BC, and was replaced by the Western Han dynasty in 202 BC after a period of internal conflict. This period of Chinese instability was a time of prosperity for the Xiongnu, who adopted many Han agriculture techniques such as slaves for heavy labor and lived in Han-style homes.

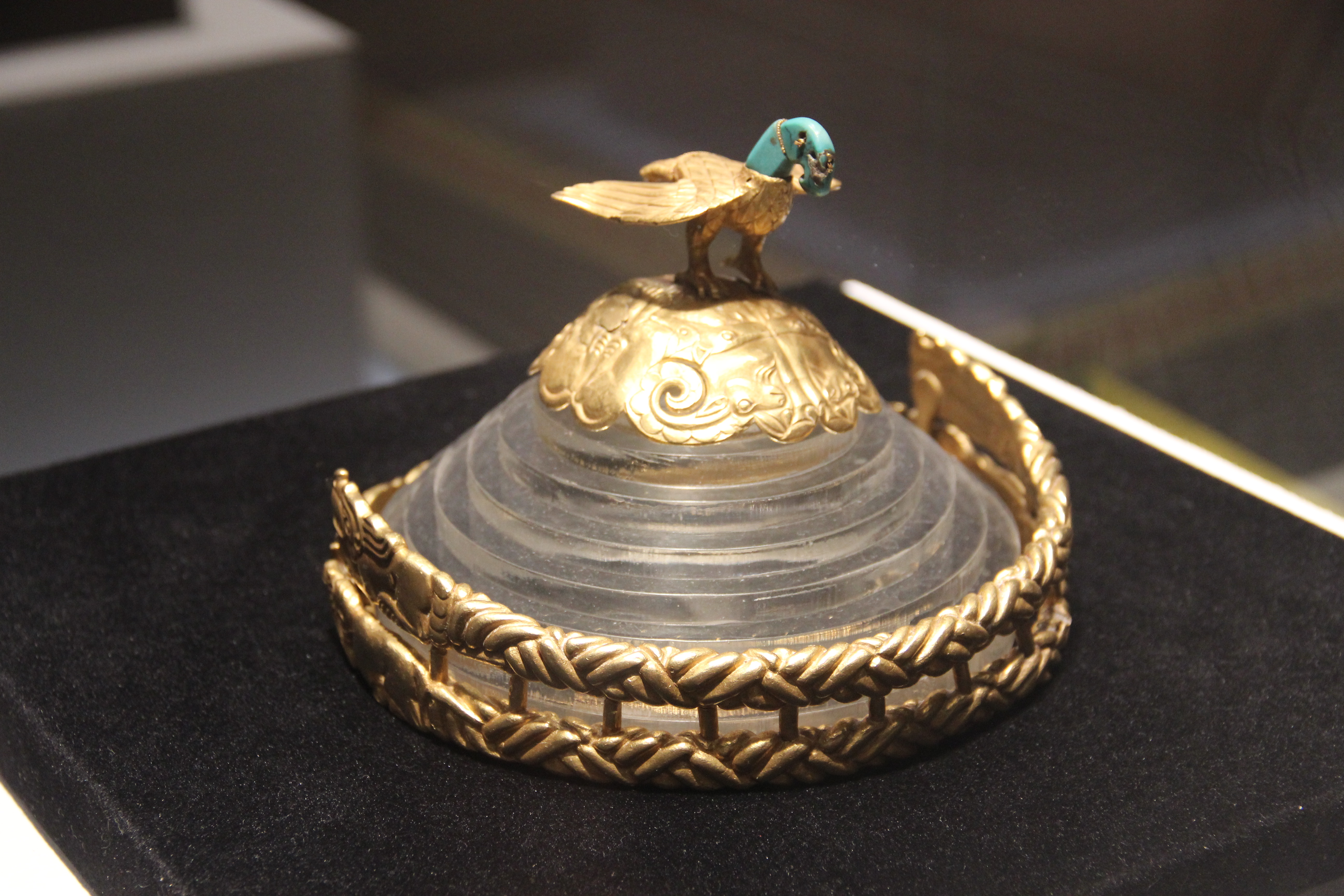
A gold crown belonging to a Xiongnu king, from the early Xiongnu period. Seen at the top of a crown is an eagle with a turquoise head.

After forging internal unity, Modu Chanyu expanded the Xiongnu empire in all directions. To the north he conquered a number of nomadic peoples, including the Dingling of southern Siberia. He crushed the power of the Donghu people of eastern Mongolia and Manchuria as well as the Yuezhi in the Hexi Corridor of Gansu, where his son, Jizhu, made a skull cup out of the Yuezhi king. Modu also retook the original homeland of Xiongnu on the Yellow River, which had previously been taken by the Qin general Meng Tian. Under Modu's leadership, the Xiongnu became powerful enough to threaten the Han dynasty.

In 200 BC, Modu besieged the first Han dynasty emperor Gaozu (Gao-Di) with his 320,000-strong army at Peteng Fortress in Baideng (present-day Datong, Shanxi). After Gaozu (Gao-Di) agreed to all Modu's terms, such as ceding the northern provinces to the Xiongnu and paying annual taxes, he was allowed to leave the siege. Although Gaozu was able to return to his capital Chang'an (present-day Xi'an), Modu occasionally threatened the Han's northern frontier and finally in 198 BC, a peace treaty was settled.

Xiongnu in their expansion drove their western neighbour Yuezhi from the Hexi Corridor in year 176 BC, killing the Yuezhi king and asserting their presence in the Western Regions.

By the time of Modu's death in 174 BC, the Xiongnu were recognized as the most prominent of the nomads bordering the Han empire According to the Book of Han, later quoted in Duan Chengshi's ninth-century Miscellaneous Morsels from Youyang:

Also, according to the Han shu, Wang Wu (王烏) and others were sent as envoys to pay a visit to the Xiongnu. According to the customs of the Xiongnu, if the Han envoys did not remove their tallies of authority, and if they did not allow their faces to be tattooed, they could not gain entrance into the yurts. Wang Wu and his company removed their tallies, submitted to tattoo, and thus gained entry. The Shanyu looked upon them very highly.

=== Xiongnu hierarchy ===
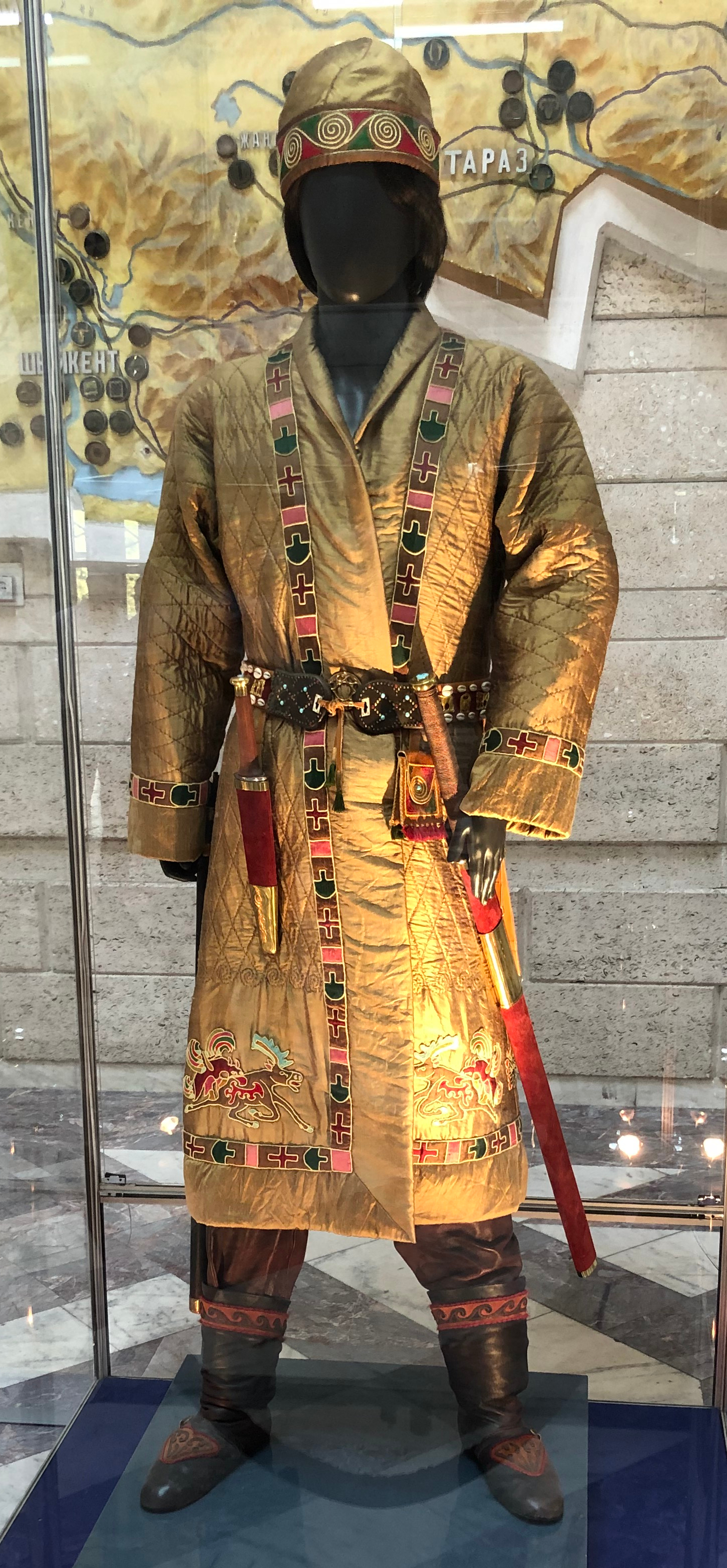
Xiongnu chief, 2nd century BC – 1st century AD. Reconstruction by archaeologist A. N. Podushkin, in the Central State Museum of Kazakhstan.

The ruler of the Xiongnu was called the chanyu. Under him were the tuqi kings. The Tuqi King of the Left was normally the heir presumptive. Below him in the hierarchy were more officials in pairs of left and right: the guli, the army commanders, the great governors, the danghu and the gudu. Beneath them were the commanders of detachments of one thousand, of one hundred, and of ten men. This nation of nomads, was organized like an army.

After Modu, later leaders formed a dualistic system of political organisation with the left and right branches of the Xiongnu divided on a regional basis. The chanyu or shanyu, a ruler equivalent to the Emperor of China, exercised direct authority over the central territory. Longcheng (around the Khangai Mountains, Otuken) (Chinese: 龍城; Mongolian: Luut; lit. "Dragon City") became the annual meeting place and served as the Xiongnu capital. The ruins of Longcheng were found south of Ulziit District, Arkhangai Province, in 2017.

North of Shanxi with the Tuqi King of the Left was holding the area north of Beijing and the Tuqi King of the Right was holding the Ordos Loop area as far as Gansu.

=== Marriage diplomacy with Han dynasty ===
In the winter of 200 BC, following a Xiongnu siege of Taiyuan, Emperor Gaozu of Han personally led a military campaign against Modu Chanyu. At the Battle of Baideng, he was ambushed, reputedly by Xiongnu cavalry. The Emperor was cut off from supplies and reinforcements for seven days, only narrowly escaping capture.

The Han dynasty sent commoner women falsely labeled as "princesses" and members of the Han imperial family to the Xiongnu multiple times when they were practicing Heqin (Chinese: 和親; lit. 'harmonious kinship') marriage alliances with the Xiongnu in order to avoid sending the Emperor's daughters. The Han sent these "princesses" to marry Xiongnu leaders in their efforts to stop the border raids. Along with arranged marriages, the Han sent gifts to bribe the Xiongnu to stop attacking. After the defeat at Pingcheng in 200 BC, the Han emperor abandoned a military solution to the Xiongnu threat. Instead, in 198 BC, the courtier Liu Jing was dispatched for negotiations. The peace settlement eventually reached between the parties included a Han princess given in marriage to the chanyu; periodic gifts to the Xiongnu of silk, distilled beverages and rice; equal status between the states; and a boundary wall as a mutual border.

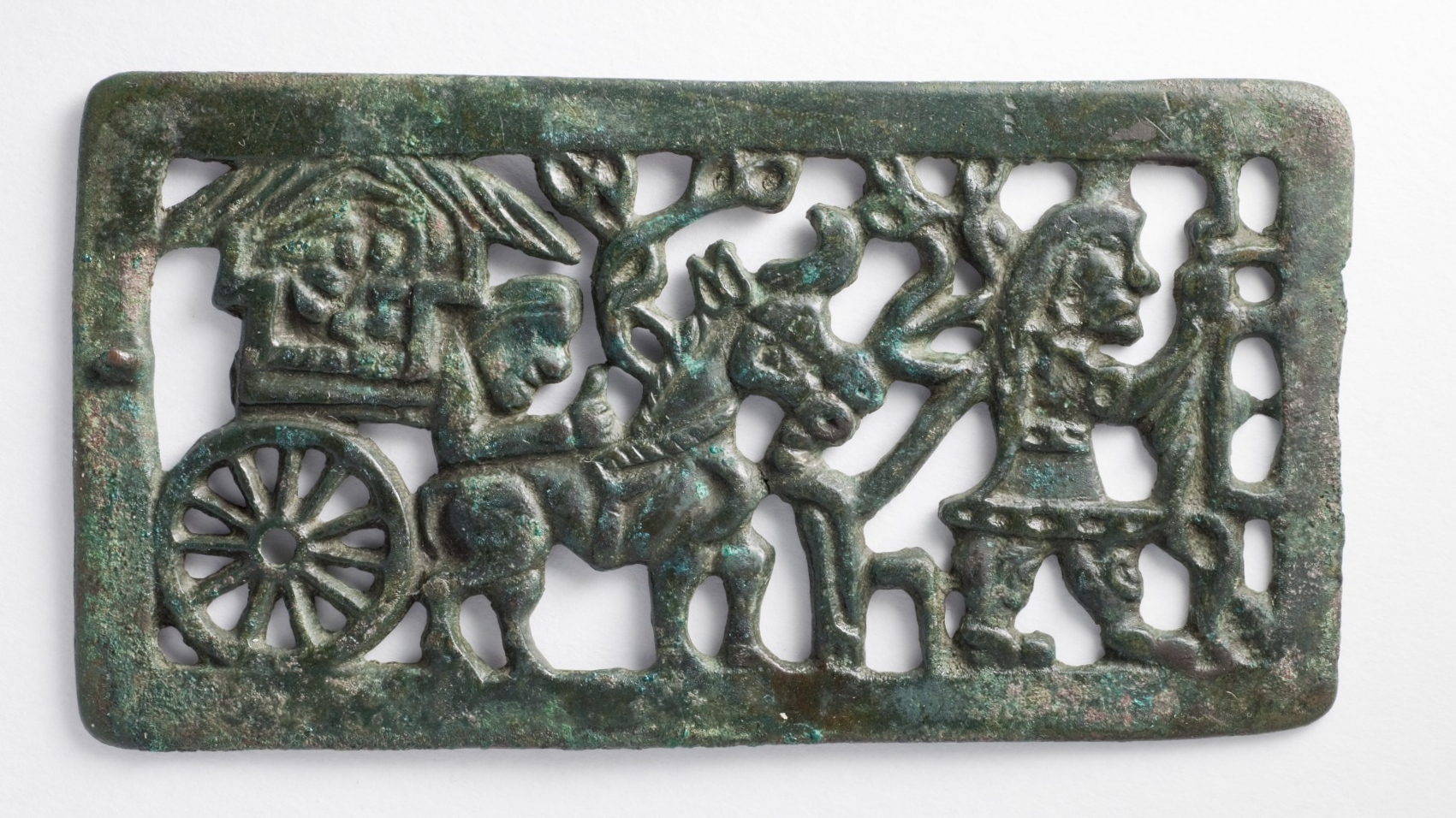
A traveling nomad family led by a man in belted jacket and trousers, pulling a nomadic cart. Belt Buckle, Mongolia or southern Siberia, dated to 2nd–1st century BC (Xiongnu period).

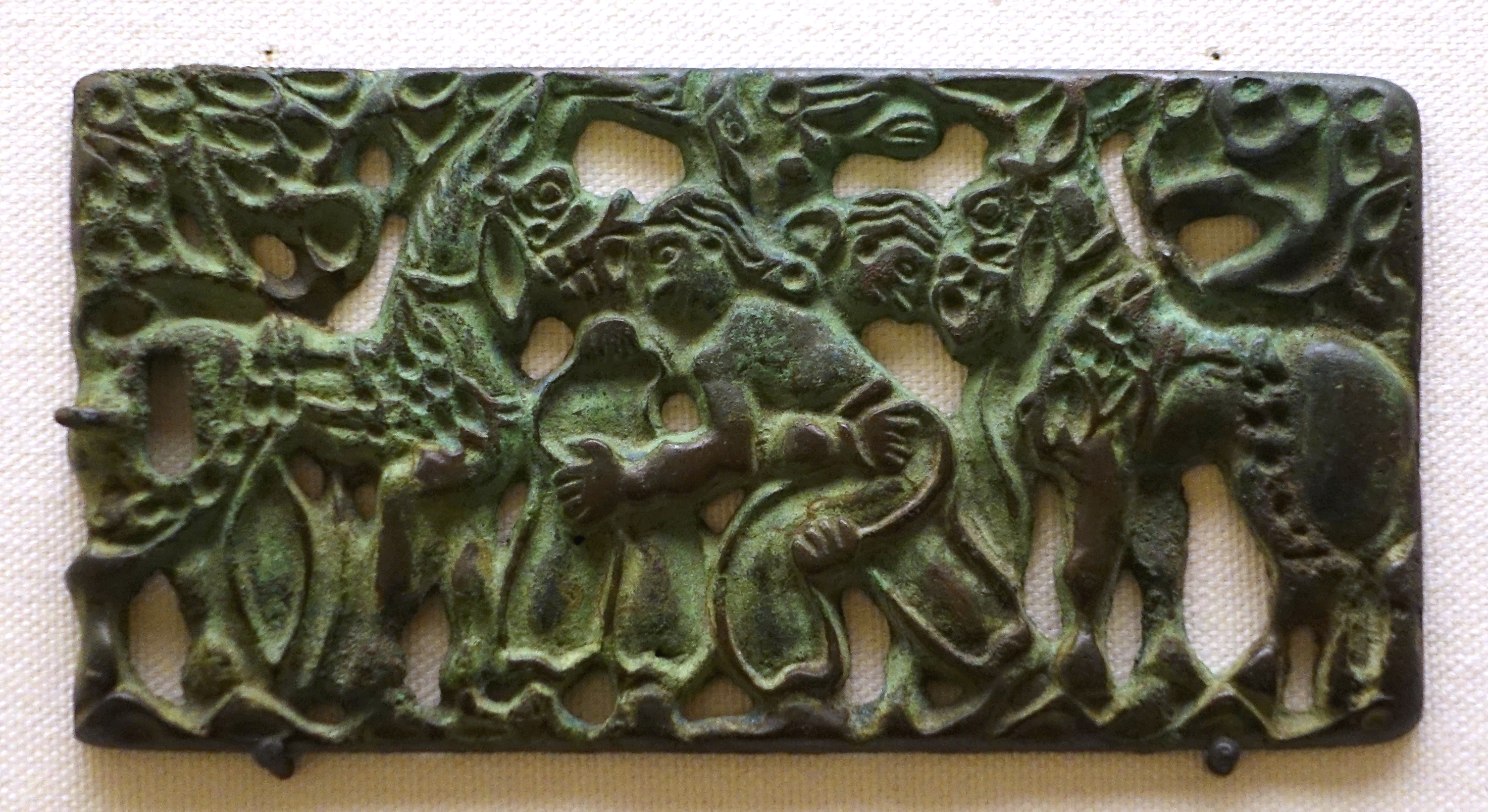
Belt plaque with design of wrestling men, Ordos region and western part of North China, 2nd century BC, bronze - Ethnological Museum, Berlin. According to Frankfort, the wrestlers are Xiongnu, and their horses have Xiongnu-type horse trappings.

This first treaty set the pattern for relations between the Han and the Xiongnu for sixty years. Up to 135 BC, the treaty was renewed nine times, each time with an increase in the "gifts" to the Xiongnu Empire. In 192 BC, Modun even asked for the hand of Emperor Gaozu of Han widow Empress Lü Zhi. His son and successor, the energetic Jiyu, known as Laoshang Chanyu, continued his father's expansionist policies. Laoshang succeeded in negotiating terms with Emperor Wen for the maintenance of a large scale government sponsored market system.

While the Xiongnu benefited handsomely, from the Chinese perspective marriage treaties were costly, very humiliating and ineffective. Laoshang Chanyu showed that he did not take the peace treaty seriously. On one occasion his scouts penetrated to a point near Chang'an. In 166 BC he personally led 140,000 cavalry to invade Anding, reaching as far as the imperial retreat at Yong. In 158 BC, his successor sent 30,000 cavalry to attack Shangdang and another 30,000 to Yunzhong.

The Xiongnu also practiced marriage alliances with Han dynasty officers and officials who defected to their side by marrying off sisters and daughters of the chanyu to Han Chinese who joined the Xiongnu and Xiongnu in Han service. The daughter of Laoshang Chanyu (and older sister of Junchen Chanyu and Yizhixie Chanyu) was married to the Xiongnu General Zhao Xin, the Marquis of Xi who was serving the Han dynasty. The daughter of Qiedihou Chanyu was married to the Han Chinese General Li Ling after he surrendered and defected. Another Han Chinese General who defected to the Xiongnu was Li Guangli, a general in the War of the Heavenly Horses, who also married a daughter of the Hulugu Chanyu. The Han Chinese diplomat Su Wu married a Xiongnu woman given by Li Ling when he was arrested and taken captive. Han Chinese explorer Zhang Qian married a Xiongnu woman and had a child with her when he was taken captive by the Xiongnu.

The khagans of the Yenisei Kyrgyz Khaganate claimed descent from the Chinese general Li Ling, grandson of the Han dynasty general Li Guang. Li Ling was captured by the Xiongnu and defected in the first century BC. And since the Tang royal Li family also claimed descent from Li Guang, the Kirghiz Khagan was therefore recognized as a member of the Tang Imperial family. This relationship soothed the relationship when Kyrgyz khagan Are (阿熱) invaded Uyghur Khaganate and executed Qasar Qaghan. The news brought to Chang'an by Kyrgyz ambassador Zhuwu Hesu (註吾合素).

=== Han–Xiongnu wars ===
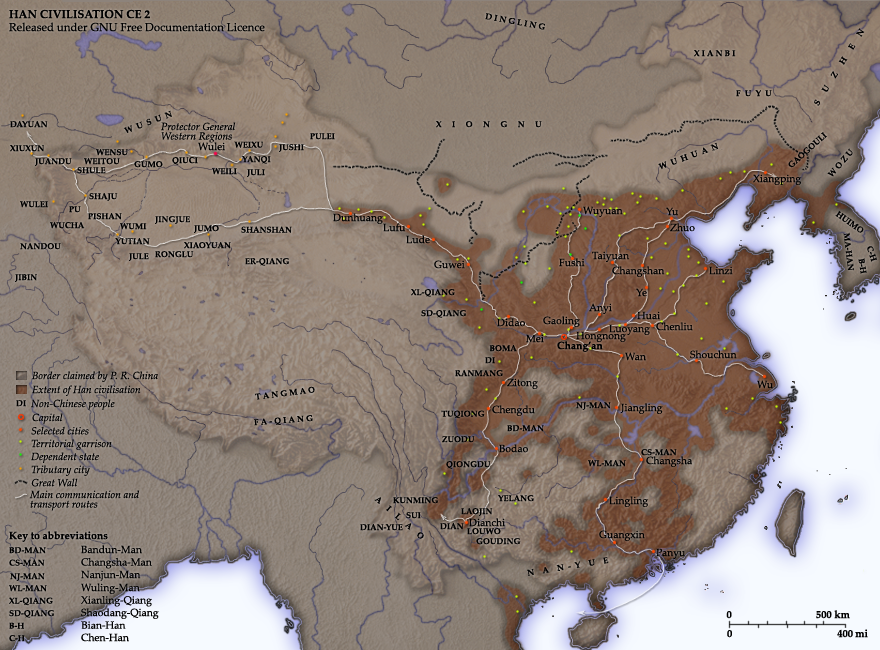
The Han dynasty in 2 AD

The Han dynasty made preparations for war when Emperor Wu dispatched Zhang Qian to explore the mysterious kingdoms to the west and to form an alliance with the Yuezhi people in order to combat the Xiongnu. During this time Zhang married a Xiongnu wife, who bore him a son, and gained the trust of the Xiongnu leader. While Zhang Qian did not succeed in this mission, his reports of the west provided even greater incentive to counter the Xiongnu hold on westward routes out of the Han Empire, and the Han prepared to mount a large scale attack using the Northern Silk Road to move men and material.

While the Han dynasty had been making preparations for a military confrontation since the reign of Emperor Wen, the break did not come until 133 BC, following an abortive trap to ambush the Chanyu at Mayi. By that point the empire was consolidated politically, militarily and economically, and was led by an adventurous pro-war faction at court. In that year, Emperor Wu reversed the decision he had made the year before to renew the peace treaty.

Full-scale war broke out in late 129 BC, when 40,000 Han cavalry made a surprise attack on the Xiongnu at the border markets. In 127 BC, the Han general Wei Qing retook the Ordos. In 121 BC, the Xiongnu suffered another setback when Huo Qubing led a force of light cavalry westward out of Longxi and within six days fought his way through five Xiongnu kingdoms. The Xiongnu Hunye king was forced to surrender with 40,000 men. In 119 BC both Huo and Wei, each leading 50,000 cavalrymen and 100,000 footsoldiers (in order to keep up with the mobility of the Xiongnu, many of the non-cavalry Han soldiers were mobile infantrymen who traveled on horseback but fought on foot), and advancing along different routes, forced the Chanyu and his Xiongnu court to flee north of the Gobi Desert.

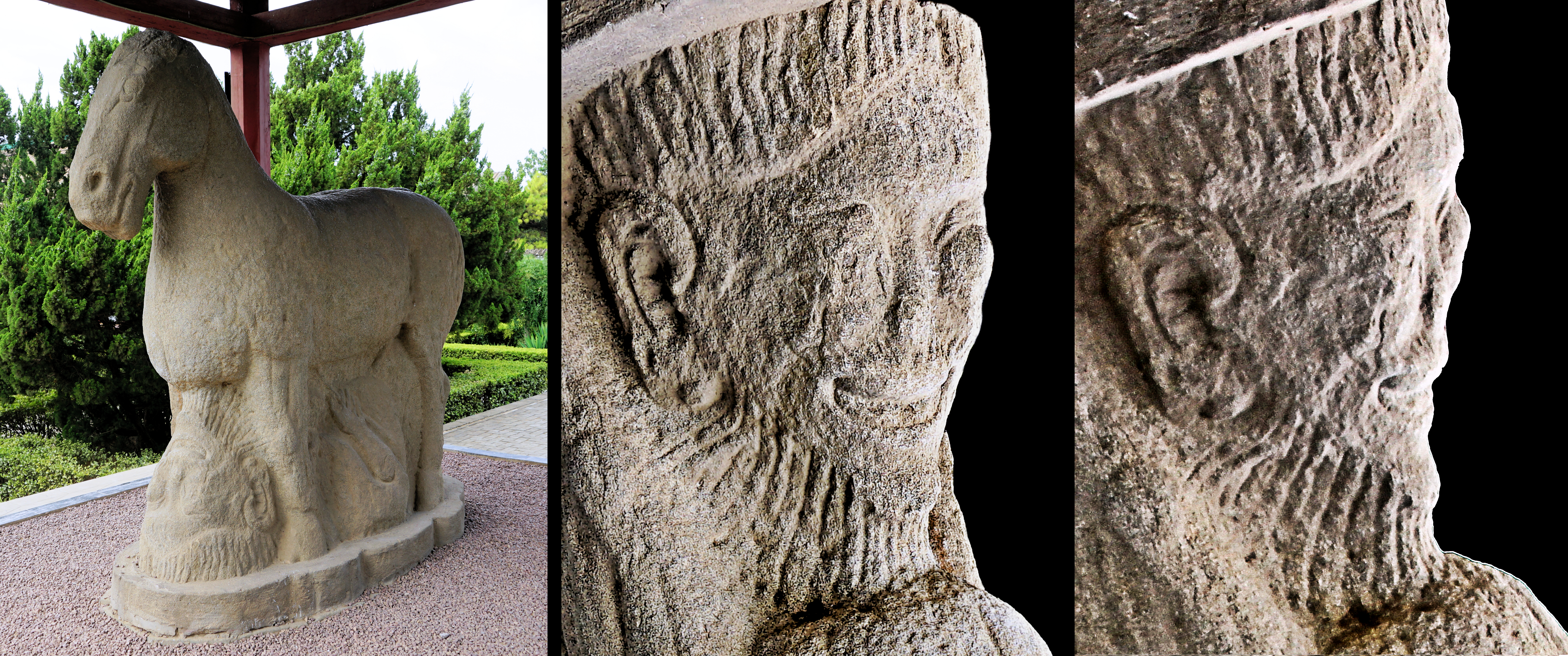
Horse trampling a Xiongnu warrior, with detail of the warrior's facial features. 2nd century BC statue from the tomb of Chinese general Huo Qubing, who fought decisively against the Xiongnu (died 117 BC).

Major logistical difficulties limited the duration and long-term continuation of these campaigns. According to the analysis of Yan You (嚴尤), the difficulties were twofold. Firstly there was the problem of supplying food across long distances. Secondly, the weather in the northern Xiongnu lands was difficult for Han soldiers, who could never carry enough fuel. (Note: This view was put forward to Wang Mang in AD 14.) According to official reports, the Xiongnu lost 80,000 to 90,000 men, and out of the 140,000 horses the Han forces had brought into the desert, fewer than 30,000 returned to the Han Empire.

In 104 and 102 BC, the Han fought and won the War of the Heavenly Horses against the Kingdom of Dayuan. As a result, the Han gained many Ferghana horses which further aided them in their battle against the Xiongnu. As a result of these battles, the Han Empire controlled the strategic region from the Ordos and Gansu corridor to Lop Nor. They succeeded in separating the Xiongnu from the Qiang peoples to the south, and also gained direct access to the Western Regions. Because of strong Han control over the Xiongnu, the Xiongnu became unstable and were no longer a threat to the Han Empire.

=== Xiongnu Civil War (60–53 BC) ===
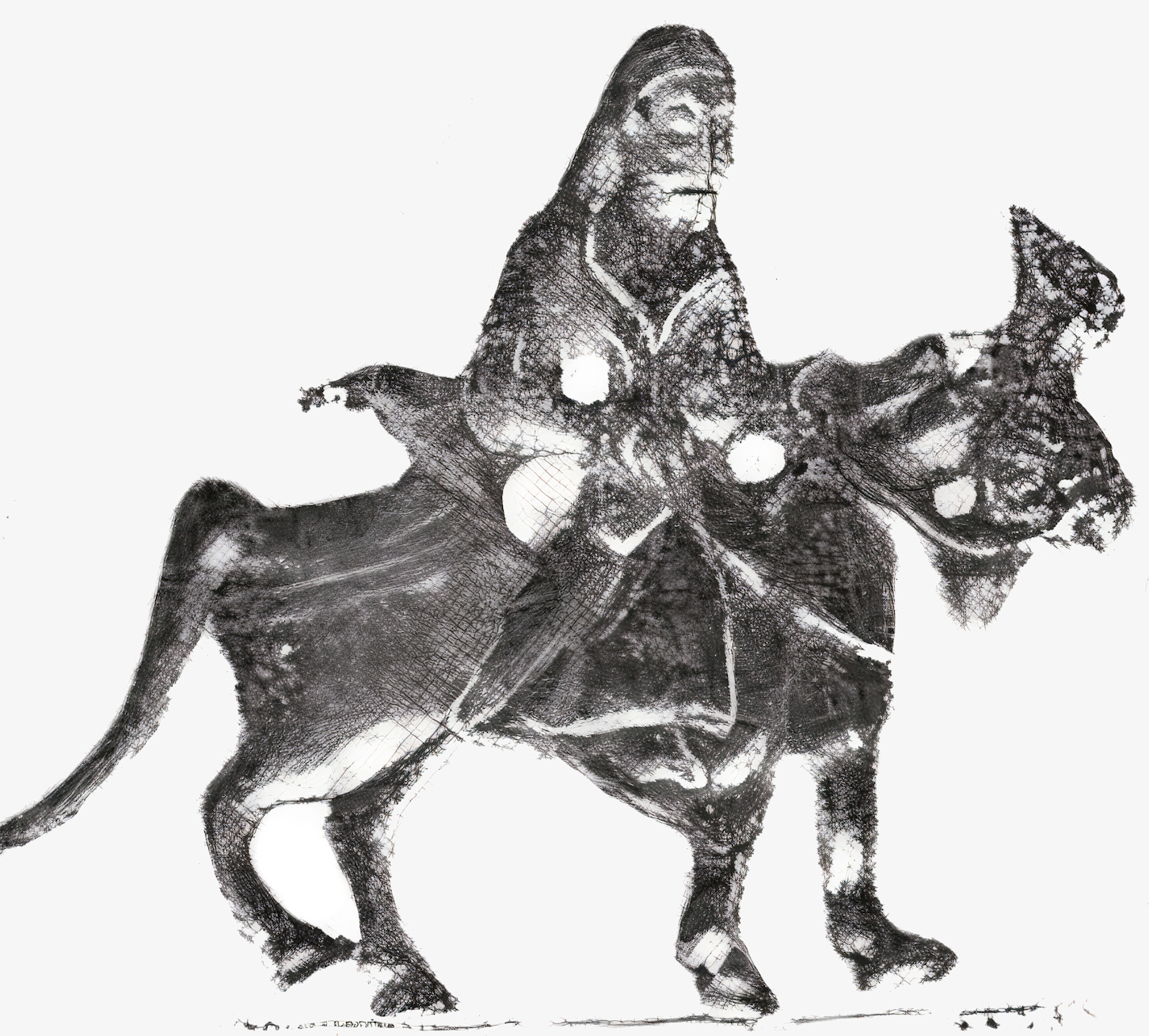
Depiction of a Xiongnu horseman on a bronze plaque. (Note: Small bronze plaque showing a horseman with prominent cheekbones and full beard, from Troitskosavsk,Transbaikalia. Features are similar to those of the Xiongnu statue of Huo Qubing.)

When a chanyu died, power could pass to his younger brother if his son was not of age. This system normally kept an adult male on the throne, but could cause trouble in later generations when there were several lineages that might claim the throne. When Xulüquanqu Chanyu died in 60 BC, power was taken by Woyanqudi, a grandson of Xulüquanqu's cousin. Being something of a usurper, he tried to put his own men in power, which only increased his number of his enemies. Xulüquanqu's son fled east and, in 58 BC, revolted. Few would support Woyanqudi and he was driven to suicide, leaving the rebel son, Huhanye, as the chanyu. The Woyanqudi faction then set up his brother, Tuqi, as chanyu in 58 BC. In 57 BC three more men declared themselves chanyu. Two dropped their claims in favor of the third who was defeated by Tuqi in that year and surrendered to Huhanye the following year. In 56 BC Tuqi was defeated by Huhanye and committed suicide, but two more claimants appeared: Runzhen and Huhanye's elder brother Zhizhi Chanyu. Runzhen was killed by Zhizhi in 54 BC, leaving only Zhizhi and Huhanye. Zhizhi grew in power, and, in 53 BC, Huhanye moved south and submitted to the Chinese. Huhanye used Chinese support to weaken Zhizhi, who gradually moved west. In 49 BC, a brother to Tuqi set himself up as chanyu and was killed by Zhizhi. In 36 BC, Zhizhi was killed by a Chinese army while trying to establish a new kingdom in the far west near Lake Balkhash.

=== Tributary relations with the Han ===
In 53 BC Huhanye decided to enter into tributary relations with Han China. The original terms insisted on by the Han court were that, first, the Chanyu or his representatives should come to the capital to pay homage; secondly, the Chanyu should send a hostage prince; and thirdly, the Chanyu should present tribute to the Han emperor. The political status of the Xiongnu in the Chinese world order was reduced from that of a "brotherly state" to that of an "outer vassal" (外臣).

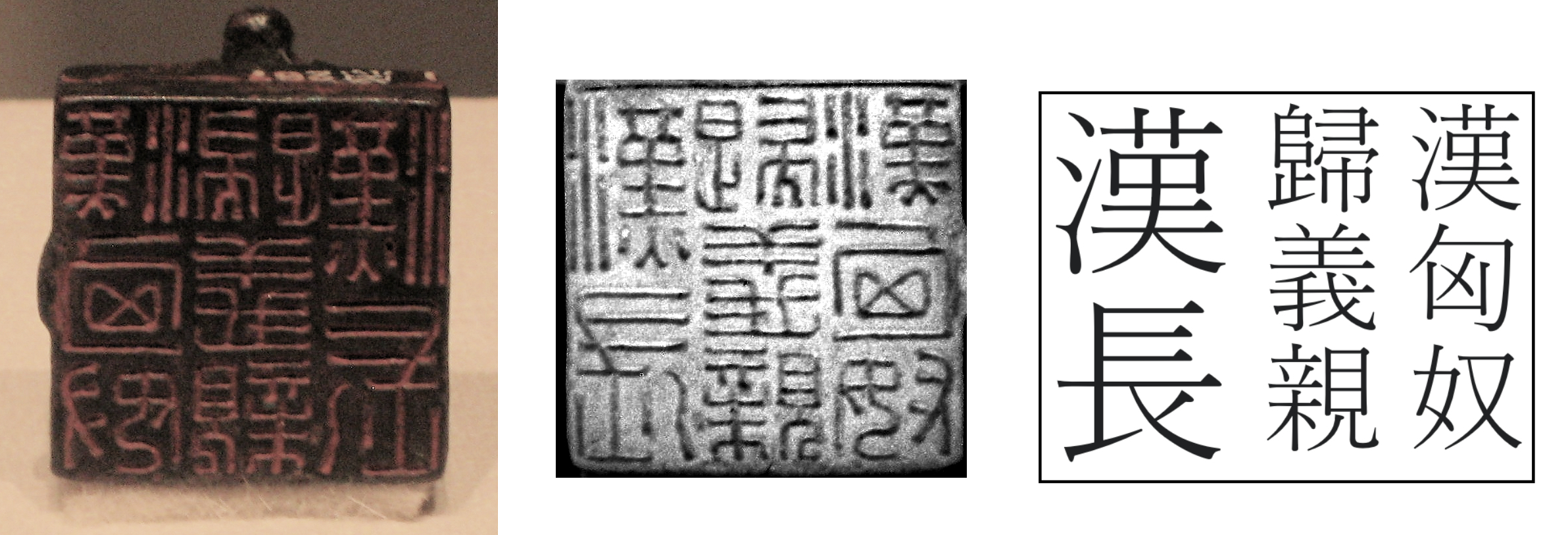
Bronze seal of a Xiongnu chief, conferred by the Eastern Han government. Inscribed 漢匈奴/歸義親/漢長 ("The Chief of the Han Xiongnu, who have returned to righteousness and embraced the Han"). Seal, impression, and transcription in standard characters.

Huhanye sent his son, the "wise king of the right" Shuloujutang, to the Han court as hostage. In 51 BC he personally visited Chang'an to pay homage to the emperor on the Lunar New Year. In the same year, another envoy Qijushan was received at the Ganquan Palace in the north-west of modern Shanxi. On the financial side, Huhanye was amply rewarded in large quantities of gold, cash, clothes, silk, horses and grain for his participation. Huhanye made two further homage trips, in 49 BC and 33 BC; with each one the imperial gifts were increased. On the last trip, Huhanye took the opportunity to ask to be allowed to become an imperial son-in-law. As a sign of the decline in the political status of the Xiongnu, Emperor Yuan refused, giving him instead five ladies-in-waiting. One of them was Wang Zhaojun, famed in Chinese folklore as one of the Four Beauties.

When Zhizhi learned of his brother's submission, he also sent a son to the Han court as hostage in 53 BC. Then twice –in 51 BC and 50 BC– he sent envoys to the Han court with tribute. But having failed to pay homage personally, he was never admitted to the tributary system. In 36 BC, a junior officer named Chen Tang, with the help of Gan Yanshou, protector-general of the Western Regions, assembled an expeditionary force that defeated him at the Battle of Zhizhi and sent his head as a trophy to Chang'an.

Tributary relations were discontinued during the reign of Huduershi (18–48 AD), corresponding to the political upheavals of the Xin dynasty. The Xiongnu took the opportunity to regain control of the western regions, as well as neighboring peoples such as the Wuhuan. In 24 AD, Hudershi even talked about reversing the tributary system.

=== Southern Xiongnu and Northern Xiongnu ===
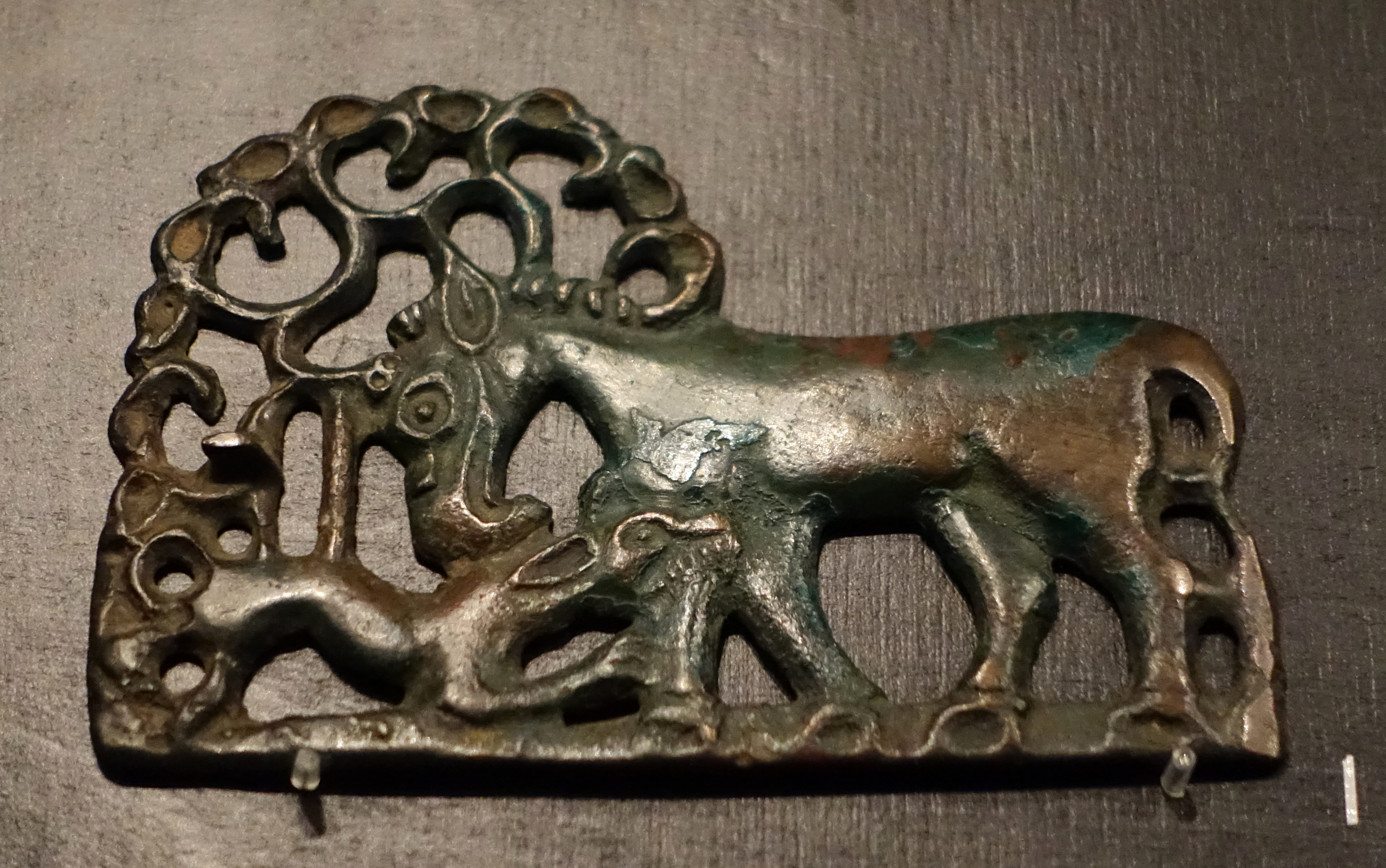
Belt hook depicting an animal fight, Xiongnu, 200–100 BC, bronze. Östasiatiska museet, Stockholm.

The Xiongnu's new power was met with a policy of appeasement by Emperor Guangwu. At the height of his power, Huduershi even compared himself to his illustrious ancestor, Modu. Due to growing regionalism among the Xiongnu, however, Huduershi was never able to establish unquestioned authority. In contravention of a principle of fraternal succession established by Huhanye, Huduershi designated his son Punu as heir-apparent. However, as the eldest son of the preceding chanyu, Bi (Pi)—the Rizhu King of the Right—had a more legitimate claim. Consequently, Bi refused to attend the annual meeting at the chanyu's court. Nevertheless, in 46 AD, Punu ascended the throne.

In 48 AD, a confederation of eight Xiongnu tribes in Bi's power base in the south, with a military force totalling 40,000 to 50,000 men, seceded from Punu's kingdom and acclaimed Bi as chanyu. This kingdom became known as the Southern Xiongnu (Chinese: 南匈奴; pinyin: Nán Xiōngnú).

==== Northern Xiongnu ====
The rump kingdom under Punu, around the Orkhon (modern north central Mongolia) became known as the Northern Xiongnu (Chinese: 北匈奴; pinyin: Běi Xiōngnú), with Punu, becoming known as the Northern Chanyu. In 49 AD, the Northern Xiongnu was dealt a heavy defeat to the Southern Xiongnu. That same year, Zhai Tong, a Han governor of Liaodong also enticed the Wuhuan and Xianbei into attacking the Northern Xiongnu. Soon, Punu began sending envoys on several separate occasions to negotiate peace with the Han dynasty, but made little to no progress.

In the 60s, the Northern Xiongnu resumed hostilities as they attempted to expand their influence into the Western Regions and launched raids on the Han borders. In 73, the Han responded by sending Dou Gu and Geng Chong to lead a great expedition against the Northern Xiongnu in the Tarim Basin. The expedition, which saw the exploits of the famed general, Ban Chao, was initially successful, but the Han had to temporarily withdraw in 75 due to matters back home. Ban Chao remained behind and maintained Chinese influence over the Western Regions before his death in 102.

For the next decade, the Northern Xiongnu had to endure famines largely due to locust plagues. In 87, they suffered a major defeat to the Xianbei, who killed their chanyu Youliu and took his skin as a trophy. With the Northern Xiongnu in disarray, the Han general, Dou Xian launched an expedition and crushed them at the Battle of the Altai Mountains in 89. After another Han attack in 91, the Northern Chanyu fled with his followers to the northwest, and was not seen again, while those that remained behind surrendered to the Han.

In 94, dissatisfied with the newly appointed chanyu, the surrendered Northern Xiongnu rebelled and acclaimed Fenghou as their chanyu, who led them to flee outside the border. However, the separatist regime continued to face famines and the growing threat of the Xianbei, prompting 10,000 of them to return to Han in 96. Fenghou later sent envoys to Han intending to submit as a vassal but was rejected. The Northern Xiongnu were scattered, with most of them being absorbed by the Xianbei. In 118, a defeated Fenghou brought around 100 followers to surrender to Han.

Remnants of the Northern Xiongnu held out in the Tarim Basin as they allied themselves with the Nearer Jushi Kingdom and captured Yiwu in 119. By 126, they were subjugated by the Han general, Ban Yong, while a branch led by a "Huyan King" continued to resist. The Huyan King was last mentioned in 151 when he launched an attack on Yiwu but was driven away by Han forces. According to the fifth-century Book of Wei, the remnants of Northern Chanyu's tribe settled as Yueban, near Kucha and subjugated the Wusun; while the rest fled across the Altai Mountains towards Kangju in Transoxania. It states that this group later became the Hephthalites.

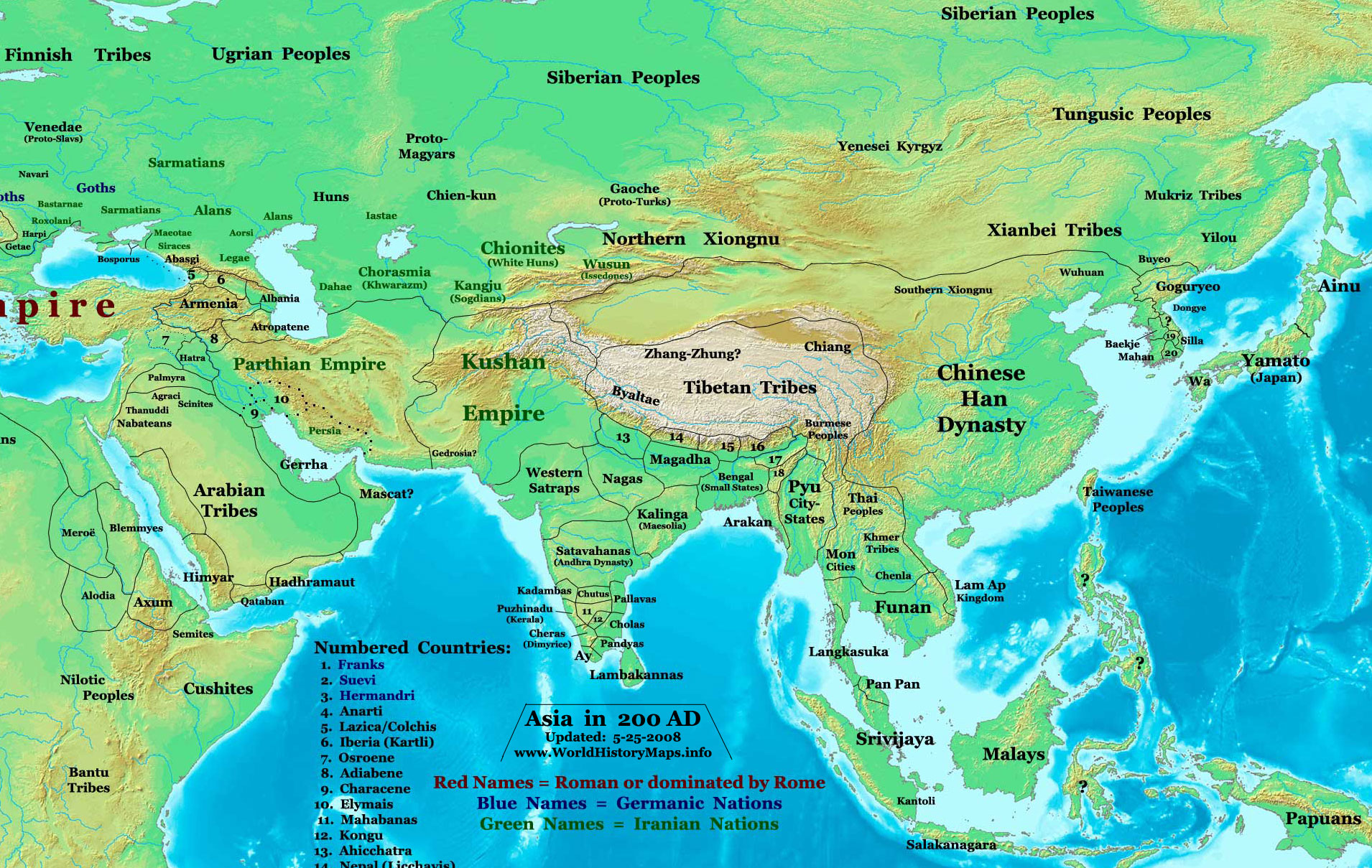
Southern and Northern Xiongnu in 200 AD, before the collapse of the Han dynasty.

==== Southern Xiongnu ====
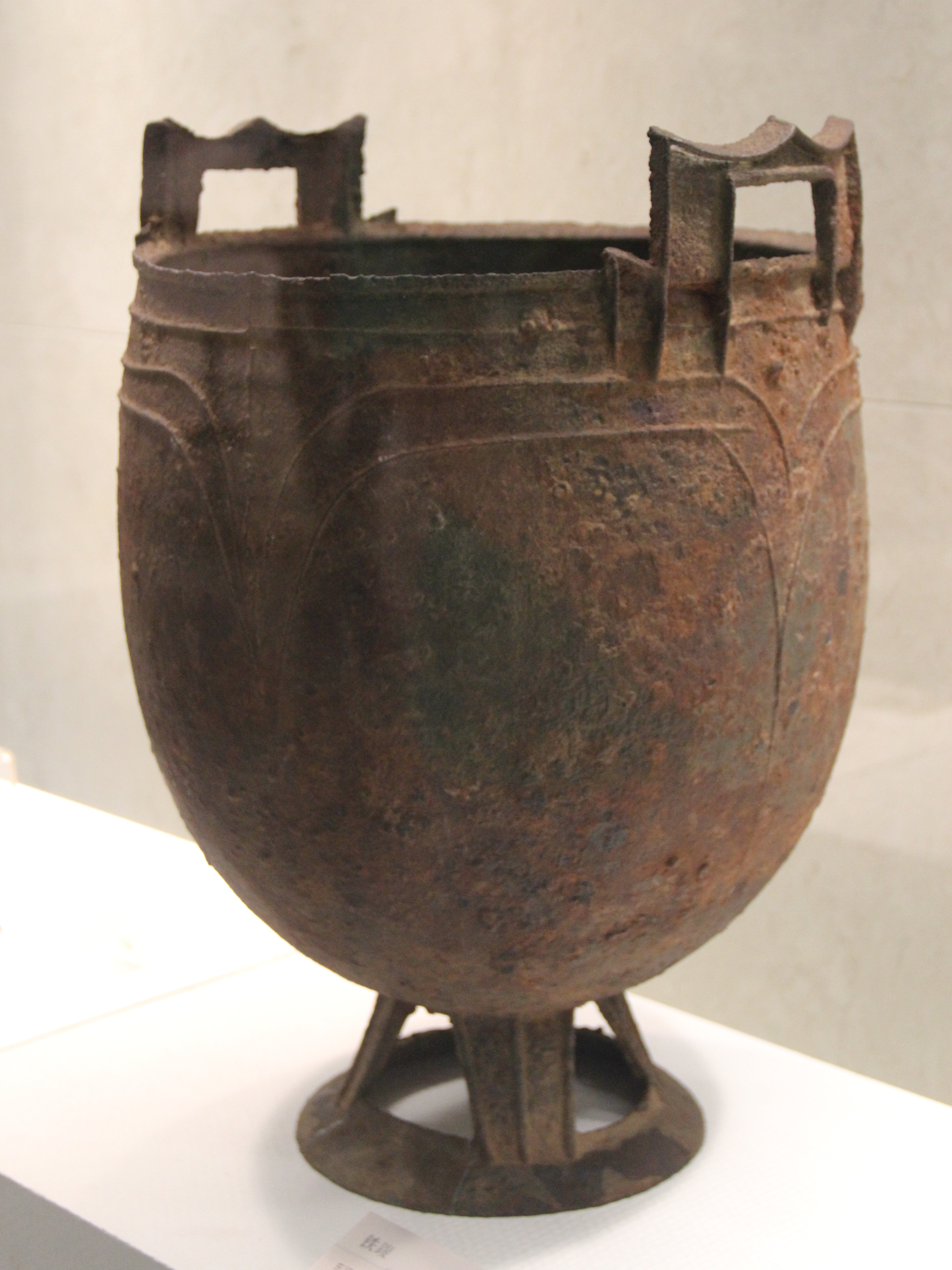
Xiongnu cauldron, Eastern Han

Coincidentally, the Southern Xiongnu were plagued by natural disasters and misfortunes—notwithstanding the threat posed by Punu. Hence, in 50 AD, the Southern Xiongnu submitted to tributary relations with Han China. The southern Chanyu was ordered to establish his court in Meiji County, Xihe Commandery while his followers were resettled in eight frontier commanderies. At the same time, large numbers of Chinese were also resettled in these commanderies, in mixed Han-Xiongnu settlements. Economically, the Southern Xiongnu became reliant on trade with the Han and annual subsidies from the Chinese court.

The Southern Xiongnu served as auxiliaries in defending the northern frontier from nomadic forces and played a role in defeating the Northern Xiongnu. However, even after the fall of their northern counterpart, they continued to suffer the brunt of incessant raids, this time by the rising Xianbei people of the steppe. In addition to the poor climate and living conditions of the frontiers, their politics were also interfered with by the Chinese court, who often installed chanyus who were partial towards Han interests. The authority of the southern Chanyu waned as many of the tribesmen under his command fled back to the steppe to join the Xianbei. The Southern Xiongnu that remained mutinied from time to time, but were easily dealt with as they failed to garner enough support to their cause.

During the late 2nd century AD, the southern Chanyu began sending his people to deal with the Han's internal matters; first against the Yellow Turban Rebellion and then against the Wuhuan in Hebei in 188. Many of the Xiongnu feared that his actions would set a precedent for unending military service to the Han court. At the time, another Han vassal, the Xiuchuge, had rebelled in Bingzhou and killed the provincial inspector. Subsequently, a rebellious faction among the Chanyu's followers allied with them and killed the Chanyu as well. The Han court appointed his son, Yufuluo, entitled Chizhi Shizhu, to succeed him, but he was expelled from his territory by the rebels.

Yufuluo travelled to Luoyang to seek aid from the Han court, but the court was in disorder from the clash between Grand General He Jin and the eunuchs, and the eventual intervention of the warlord Dong Zhuo. The Chanyu later settled down with his followers around Pingyang, east of the Fen River in Shanxi, where he died and was succeeded by his brother Huchuquan in 195. Meanwhile, the rebels initially elected their own chanyu, but after he died just a year into his reign, they left the position vacant and had an elderly nominal king put in his place. The Southern Xiongnu had effectively dissolved, as many of the their tribes had broken away and maintained their distance from the ongoing Han civil war. The main exceptions were Yufuluo's group and the Xiuchuge, who were drawn into the conflict but were later subdued by the warlord Cao Cao.

The Xiongnu upheaval caused several frontier commanderies in Bing province such as Shuofang and Yunzhong to be lost to hostile tribes, prompting Cao Cao to abolish them and reduce Bing to the region of modern-day Shanxi. In 216, Cao Cao detained Huchuquan in the city of Ye and sent Huchuquan's uncle, Qubei to manage the remaining Xiongnu vassals in Shanxi. Huchuquan nominally held the chanyu position until his death, after which it was abolished. By bringing the Xiongnu closer to Chinese rule, the tribes could be better monitored to prevent them from engaging in rebellion, while also allowing Cao Cao to use them as auxiliaries in his cavalry.

=== Descendants and later states in northern China ===
Fang Xuanling's Book of Jin lists nineteen Xiongnu tribes that resettled within the Great Wall: Chuge (屠各), Xianzhi (鮮支), Koutou (寇頭), Wutan (烏譚), Chile (赤勒), Hanzhi (捍蛭), Heilang (黑狼), Chisha (赤沙), Yugang (鬱鞞), Weisuo (萎莎), Tutong (禿童), Bomie (勃蔑), Qiangqu (羌渠), Helai (賀賴), Zhongqin (鐘跂), Dalou (大樓), Yongqu (雍屈), Zhenshu (真樹) and Lijie (力羯). Among the nineteen tribes, the Chuge, also known as the Xiuchuge, were said to be the most powerful and prestigious.

With the fall of the Southern Xiongnu, the Xiongnu name gradually disappeared among their descendants as they began to intermix with the surrounding Han Chinese, Xianbei, Wuhuan and other minority ethnic peoples. They were either simply referred to as "Hu" (胡), or became core parts of larger "mixed Hu" groups (雜胡; zahu) such as the Chuge, Jie, Lushuihu and Jihu. Nonetheless, when northern China fell into the Sixteen Kingdoms period, few of the short-lived dynastic regimes emphasized their Xiongnu lineage and connections as a form of imperial legitimacy. In historiography, the Xiongnu and Jie are classed separately alongside the Di, Qiang and Xianbei as the "Five Barbarians" of the Sixteen Kingdoms.

==== Han-Zhao dynasty (304–329) ====
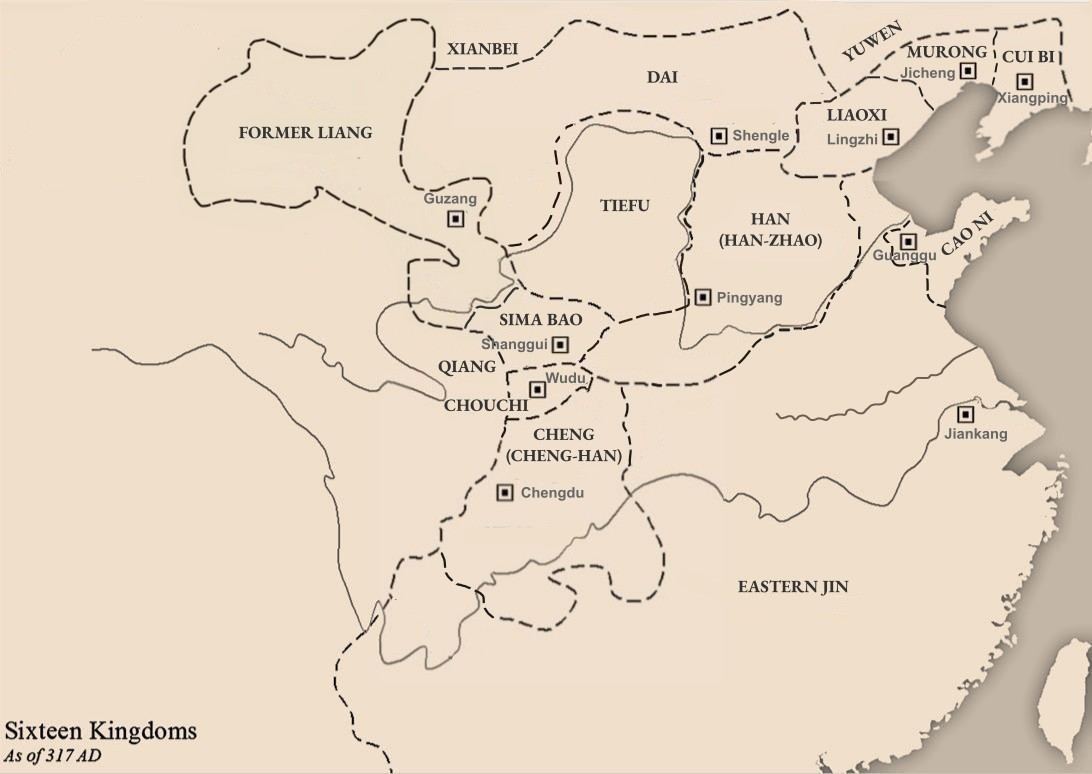
The Han-Zhao dynasty in 317 AD, shortly after the fall of the Western Jin dynasty.

To further ensure their loyalty, the Xiongnu forces in Shanxi were divided into the Five Divisions (Chinese: 五部; pinyin: Wǔbù; Left, Right, South, North and Centre) around Taiyuan Commandery and became registered households. Each division was led by a local chief, who in turn was under the surveillance of a Chinese resident. Official history states that the division was issued immediately after Cao Cao detained Huchuquan, but edicts published at the time suggest that this process may have only occurred later during the late Cao Wei (220–266) and early Western Jin (266–316) periods.

When minor revolts began breaking out among their ranks, the Wei-Jin courts forced the Xiongnu nobles to send their children as hostages to the capital at Luoyang, where they became accustomed to Chinese and Confucian scholar culture. Sinicization was also evident by their adoption of Chinese surnames, most notably "Liu" (劉). Meanwhile, the people of the Five Divisions were also identified as the Chuge by their contemporaries. Despite the Book of Jin's claim, modern historians believe that the Chuge were actually descendants of King Xiutu's people who surrendered to the Han back in 121 BC. Earlier records and seals indicate that the Chuge were considered a separate vassal from the Southern Xiongnu, and the two only merged during and after the fall of Eastern Han.

At the turn of the 4th century, the Western Jin became embroiled in a series of princely civil wars. As the wars went on, the princes sought aid from the frontier vassal tribes to replenish their exhausted armies. Sensing an opportunity, the Five Divisions plotted to breakaway, and in 304, they acclaimed Liu Yuan, who was serving as a general under one of the princes, as the leader of their rebellion. Upon returning to Shanxi that same year, Liu Yuan named himself the Grand Chanyu and later the King of Han. Traditional history state that he was a direct descendant of the Southern Xiongnu chanyus, though more recent studies suggest that he was a Chuge who forged his genealogy to the chanyu Luandi clan. Whichever the case, Liu Yuan presented his state as a restoration of the Han dynasty, claiming kinship to the imperial Liu clan through the chanyus' heqin marriages to their princesses. He adopted the Chinese model of imperial administration for his government while incorporating elements of Xiongnu governance for his military, such as the introduction of the Chanyu Platform. He also allowed Han Chinese and other non-Han rebels to join his forces as the general population began to revolt against Western Jin rule.

Liu Yuan established Pingyang as his permanent capital and further elevated himself to Emperor in 308 before dying two years later. Under his son, Liu Cong in 311, Han forces sacked Luoyang and captured the Jin emperor in an event known as the Disaster of Yongjia. A Jin restoration attempt at Chang'an was also crushed by Han in 316, causing the court to reestablish themselves south of the Yangtze River at Jiankang as the Eastern Jin. Despite their military success, the Han court suffered from violent infighting, and their real authority was only limited to parts of Shanxi. Their generals outside of the region were effectively independent warlords, the most powerful being an ethnic Jie named Shi Le in the east, and a distant cousin of Liu Cong known as Liu Yao in the west.

In 318, short after Liu Cong died, his successor and family at Pingyang were all massacred in a coup by a consort kin. Shi Le and Liu Yao joined forces to put down the rebellion, during which the latter was acclaimed as the new emperor of Han. However, suspicion arose between the two after the campaign, and Liu Yao accused Shi Le of plotting treason. In 319, Liu Yao relocated the capital to Chang'an and renamed his state to Zhao, abandoning the Han restoration cause. Unlike his predecessors, Liu Yao stressed his Xiongnu ancestry and honoured Modu Chanyu to win over the support of the minority ethnic groups. Meanwhile, Shi Le declared independence and formed his own state of Zhao. Liu Yao's state was distinguished as the Former Zhao to Shi Le's Later Zhao, and for the next decade, the two fought for supremacy over northern China. Liu Yao was eventually defeated and captured at the Battle of Luoyang in 328, and the following year, his family and state were all destroyed by the Later Zhao.

==== Later Zhao dynasty (319–351) ====
Shi Le's ancestors were part of the Qiangqu tribe of the Southern Xiongnu, but by the Western Jin period, he and his people were all known as the Jie (羯). It is generally believed that the Jie were originally people who were annexed by the Xiongnu and turned into subordinate tribes before being brought over to Shanxi, but their exact origins and composition is a matter of extensive debate among scholars today. They reportedly developed their own language, and their physical appearances were similar to those of Central Asians or Indo-Europeans. Theories include that they were of mixed backgrounds, or that they specifically descended from the Sogdian, Lesser Yuezhi, or Ket people.

During the Western Jin civil wars, many of the Jie and other Hu people in Shanxi were captured and sold into slavery, including Shi Le. After attaining his freedom, Shi Le assembled a rebel army and joined Liu Yuan, eventually establishing his own powerbase in the Hebei region for him to found the Later Zhao in 319. Even before his triumph against the Former Zhao, Shi Le had begun incorporating the Jie and various Hu people into his core. He issued a ban on the word "Hu" and granted them the dignified status of "Guoren" (國人; "Compatriots"), while the Han Chinese were designated as "Zhaoren" (趙人; "Zhao people"). The Jie and Hu dominated northern China for a time, but tension grew between them and the common Chinese people, who were especially oppressed during the reign of Shi Hu. When the Later Zhao fell into civil war in 349, the Chinese paramount general, Ran Min, issued an infamous massacre by offering to reward any Han Chinese for every Jie or Hu person they killed. Around 200,000 people died in the massacre, and the Zhao was destroyed two years later, after which the Jie seemingly disappeared from history.

==== Tiefu tribe and Helian Xia dynasty (309–431) ====
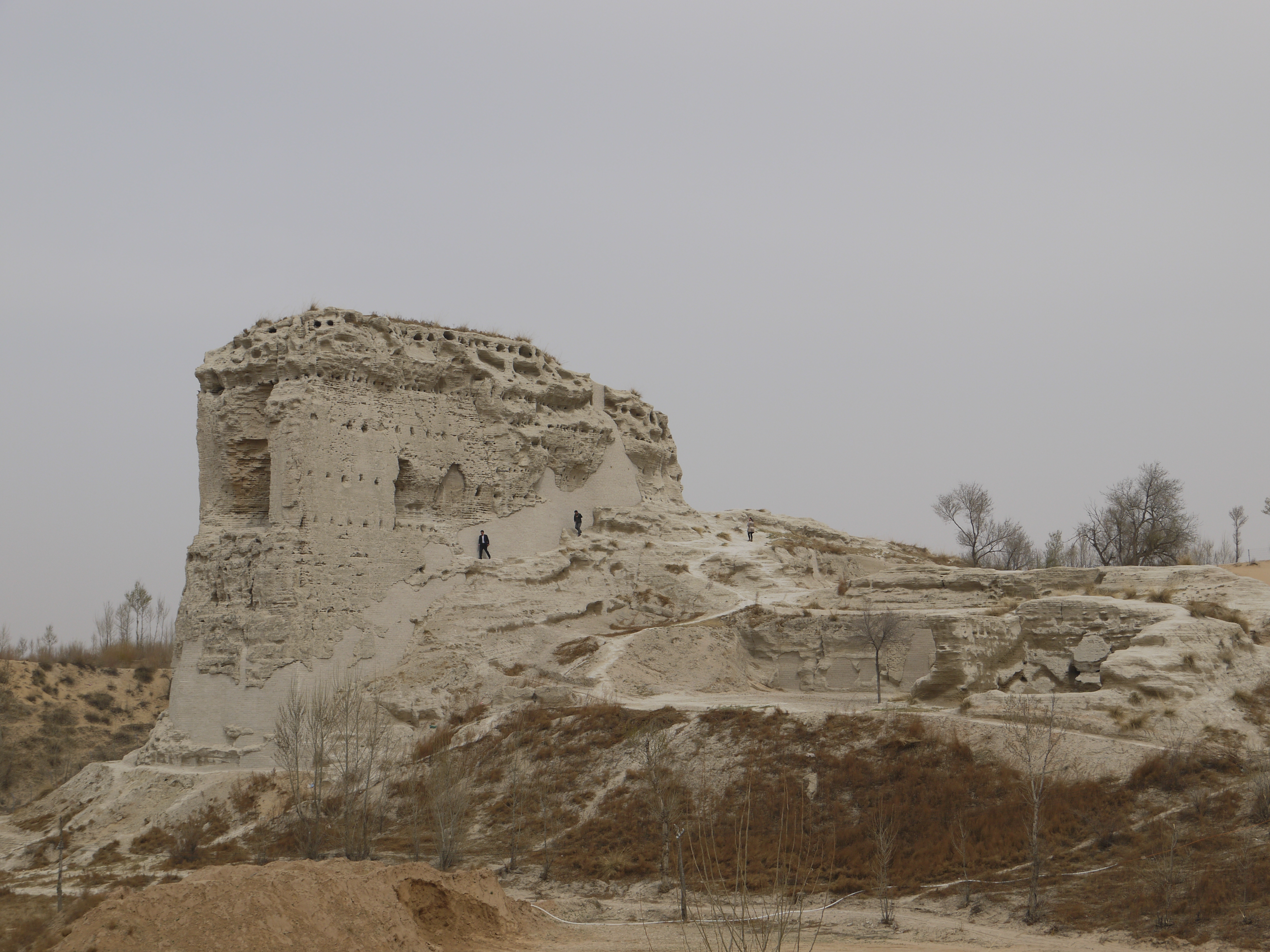
Tongwancheng (meaning "Unite All Nations"), was the first capital of the Xia that was built during the reign of Helian Bobo, located in present-day Jingbian County, Shaanxi. The ruined city was discovered in 1996 and the State Council designated it as a cultural relic under top state protection. The repair of the Yong'an Platform, where Helian Bobo reviewed parading troops, was completed and restoration on the 31 m (102 ft) tall turret follows.

The chieftains of the Tiefu tribe (鐵弗) descended from Qubei and were distantly related to the Han-Zhao ruling clan. Their name was a term for people with Xiongnu fathers and Xianbei mothers, which suggests that they intermingled with the Xianbei. Some records also refer to them as "Wuhuan", which by the 4th-century was a blanket term for Hu groups with Xianbei or Wuhuan relations. In 309, their chieftain, Liu Hu rebelled against the Western Jin in Shanxi but was driven out to Shuofang (朔方; around modern Baotou, Inner Mongolia) in the Ordos Plateau. The Ordos was largely abandoned during the fall of Han and had become home to an assortment of nomadic groups. After their arrival, the Tiefu grew into a prominent tribe in the region and developed a rivalry with the Xianbei Tuoba tribe of the northern grasslands.

In 392, the Tuoba, ruling as the Northern Wei dynasty, launched a campaign against the Tiefu and decimated the tribe. Liu Bobo, a surviving member of the Tiefu, went into exile and eventually submitted to the Qiang-led Later Qin, who garrisoned him at Shuofang. The Qin relied on the vassalage of the tribes in Ordos to defend their northern frontier, particularly from the Northern Wei. However, after suffering a great defeat at the Battle of Chaibi, the Qin were coerced into appeasement and conciliation by the Wei. In 407, angered by peace talks between the two states, Liu Bobo rebelled and united the Ordos tribes by force, styling himself as Heavenly King of Xia and Grand Chanyu.

Liu Bobo strongly affirmed his Xiongnu lineage; his state name of "Xia" was based on the claim that the Xiongnu's lineage came from the ancient Xia dynasty. He later changed his family name from "Liu" (劉; inherited through the matrilineal line) to the Xiongnu-sounding name of "Helian" (赫連; "glorious connection [to Heaven]"). Nevertheless, he also acknowledged his mixed Xiongnu-Xianbei background by ordering the rest of his clansmen to retain their old clan name, albeit slightly altered to appear more formidable as "Tiefa" (鐵伐; "iron-strike"). Helian Bobo employed a strategy of mobile guerrilla warfare, placing the Later Qin in a state of perpetual war and decline. In 418, he brought the empire to its peak by seizing the Guanzhong region from the Eastern Jin, who had conquered Qin a year prior, and elevating himself to Emperor.

Following Helian Bobo's death in 425, the Xia quickly declined due to increased military pressure from the Northern Wei. By 428, the Emperor, the capital at Tongwancheng (統萬城; in modern Jingbian County, Shaanxi) and the Guanzhong were all captured by Wei forces. The Emperor's brother, Helian Ding continued to resist and proclaimed succeeded him to the throne. He attempted to expand westward to salvage his empire, even managing to vanquish the Western Qin state in 431. However, that same year, he was ambushed and imprisoned by the nomadic Tuyuhun people of Qinghai during his campaign against the Northern Liang further west. His capture brought an end to the Xia, and the following year, the Tuyuhun delivered him to Wei, where he was subsequently executed.

==== Juqu clan and Northern Liang dynasty (401–460) ====
The Lushuihu or Lu River Hu (盧水胡) were recorded as living in northwestern China as early as the late Western Han period. They are believed to be a multi-ethnic group most prominently consisting of the native Lesser Yuezhi and Qiang as well as the Xiongnu, but had lived as Chinese subjects for centuries by the time of the Sixteen Kingdoms. A branch of them in Zhangye, modern Gansu once served the Xiongnu Empire and adopted the clan name of "Juqu" (沮渠) after the office granted to their ancestors by their Xiongnu superiors. In 397, the Juqu clan rebelled against the Di-led Later Liang and acclaimed a Han Chinese governor, Duan Ye as their leader, thus founding the Northern Liang. In 401, their chieftain, Juqu Mengxun killed Duan Ye and took the throne for himself.

After defeating their regional rivals, the Northern Liang gained sole control over the Hexi Corridor and the trade routes to Central Asia. The Juqu propagated Buddhism throughout their reign, constructing various Buddhist sites such as the Tiantishan and Mogao caves. Their regime ended up being the last of the Sixteen Kingdoms, as they eventually fell to the Northern Wei dynasty in 439. Some members of the Juqu fled west to the oasis state of Gaochang in 442, where the Northern Liang survived as a rump state until their destruction by the Rouran Khaganate in 460.

==== Assimilation and integration ====
After the Northern Wei unified the north, the mixed Hu and other Xiongnu descendants continued to intermarry and assimilate. Many of the Hu were conscripted as frontline auxiliaries for the Wei army in their military campaigns. In the northwest, where Xianbei rule was heavily resented, the Chuge and Lushuihu led multiple rebellions in alliance with the Qiang, Di and other minority ethnic groups against the Wei. Meanwhile, in Shanxi, the Erzhu clan of the Qihu people (契胡; possibly an extraction of the Jie) rendered generational military service to the Tuoba. During the Rebellion of the Six Frontier Garrisons, Erzhu Rong aided the Northern Wei pacify the uprisings, but also took the opportunity to violently seize control of the government in 528. Within the next few years, he was assassinated, and his clan was overthrown by his former subordinate, Gao Huan.

Xiongnu ancestry was also present among the Xianbei aristocracy of the Northern Wei. Long before their rule over northern China, the Tuoba-Xianbei lived in the Inner Mongolian Plateau in mixed populations, intermarrying with groups associated with the Xiongnu for generations. Few scholars have suggested that the name "Tuoba" meant "Xianbei father, Xiongnu mother". Some families such as the Dugu (a cousin branch of the Tiefu), Helan and Yuwen were once Xiongnu tribes before their integration into the Xianbei. The Yuwen most notably went on to found the Western Wei (535–557) and Northern Zhou (557–581) dynasties.

The last prominent offshoot of the Xiongnu was the Jihu people (稽胡), also known as the Buluoji (步落稽) or Shanhu (山胡; Mountain Hu), who inhabited the mountainous areas of Shaanbei and western Shanxi. They were described as being descendants of the Five Divisions, but had thoroughly mixed with the other surrounding ethnic groups of the region for centuries, developing a distinct language and culture while living among the Han Chinese. The Jihu led several revolts against the ruling dynasties and were last mentioned in the 7th century during the Tang dynasty, with their disappearance signifying the Xiongnu's complete assimilation into Chinese society.

== Significance ==
The Xiongnu confederation was unusually long-lived for a steppe empire. The purpose of raiding the Central Plain was not simply for goods, but to force the Central Plain polity to pay regular tribute. The power of the Xiongnu ruler was based on his control of Han tribute which he used to reward his supporters. The Han and Xiongnu empires rose at the same time because the Xiongnu state depended on Han tribute. A major Xiongnu weakness was the custom of lateral succession. If a dead ruler's son was not old enough to take command, power passed to the late ruler's brother. This worked in the first generation but could lead to civil war in the second generation. The first time this happened, in 60 BC, the weaker party adopted what Barfield calls the 'inner frontier strategy.' They moved south and submitted to the dominant Central Plain regime and then used the resources obtained from their overlord to defeat the Northern Xiongnu and re-establish the empire. The second time this happened, around 47 AD, the strategy failed. The southern ruler was unable to defeat the northern ruler and the Xiongnu remained divided.

== Ethnolinguistic origins ==
Historians disagree on whether the Xiongnu were of Iranian, Turkic, Mongolic or Yeniseian origin. However, some fragments from Chinese chronicles may indicate that the Xiongnu were of Turkic rather than Mongolian origin. Fragments relating to the Six Kingdoms period state that the Xiongnu spoke a language different from that of the Xianbei, who were of Mongolian or Paramongolian origin. However, the origin of the Xiongnu remains a subject of speculation.

The Xiongnu empire is widely thought to have been multiethnic. There are several theories on the ethnolinguistic identity of the Xiongnu, though there is no consensus among scholars as to what language was spoken by the Xiongnu elite.

=== Proposed link to the Huns ===
Pronunciation of 匈奴
Old Chinese (318 BC):	*hoŋ-nâ
Eastern Han Chinese:	*hɨoŋ-nɑ
Middle Chinese:	*hɨoŋ-nuo
Modern Mandarin:	[ɕjʊ́ŋ nǔ]
Sources: Schuessler (2014:264); & Zhengzhang Shangfang.

The Xiongnu-Hun hypothesis was originally proposed by the 18th-century French historian Joseph de Guignes, who noticed that ancient Chinese scholars had referred to members of tribes which were associated with the Xiongnu by names which were similar to the name "Hun", albeit with varying Chinese characters. Étienne de la Vaissière has shown that, in the Sogdian script used in the so-called "Sogdian Ancient Letters", both the Xiongnu and the Huns were referred to as the γwn (xwn), which indicates that the two names were synonymous. Although the theory that the Xiongnu were the precursors of the Huns as they were later known in Europe is now accepted by many scholars, it has yet to become a consensus view. The identification with the Huns may either be incorrect or it may be an oversimplification (as would appear to be the case with a proto-Mongol people, the Rouran, who have sometimes been linked to the Avars of Central Europe).

=== Iranian theories ===
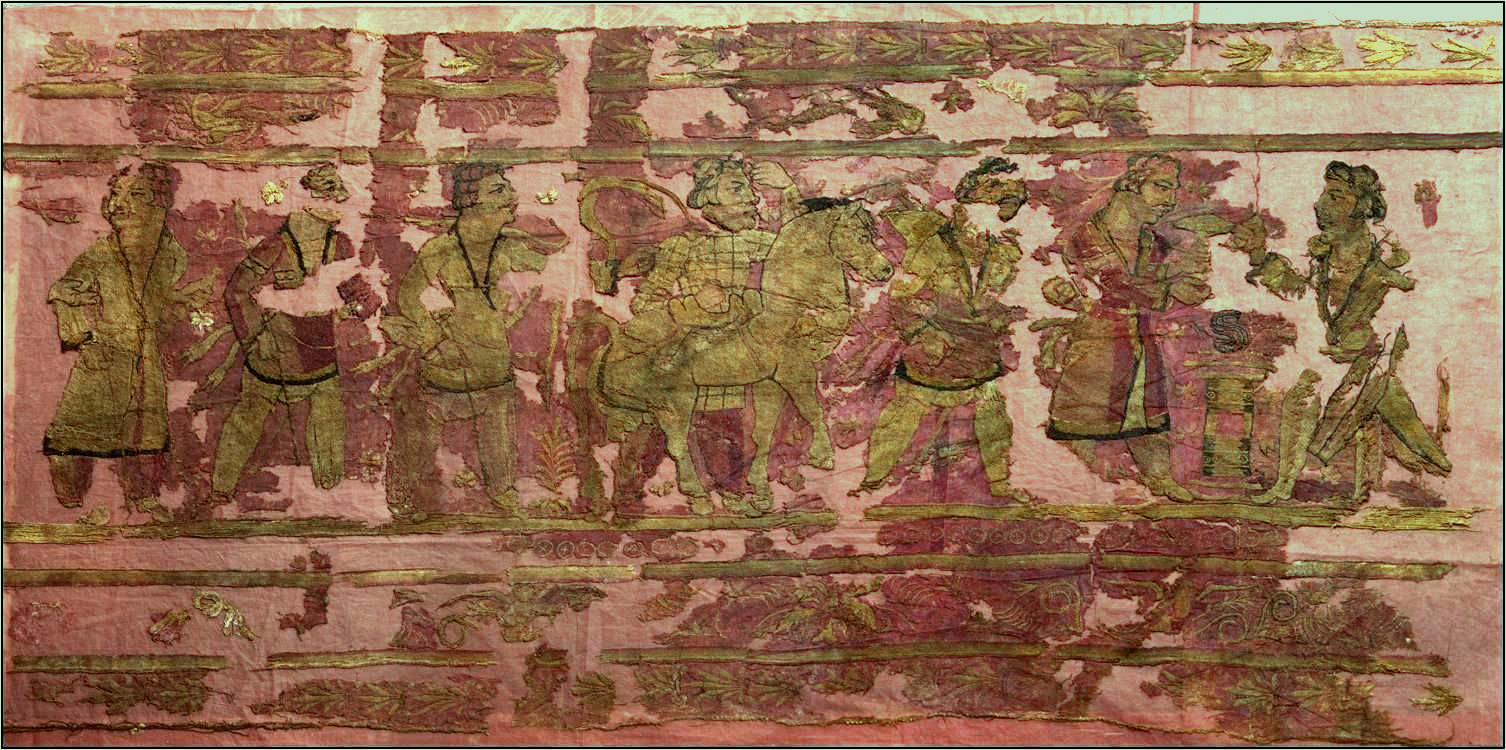
An embroidered rug from the Xiongnu Noin-Ula burial site. This luxury item was imported from Bactria, and is thought to represent Yuezhi figures.

Most scholars agree that the Xiongnu elite may have been initially of Sogdian origin, while later switching to a Turkic language. Harold Walter Bailey proposed an Iranian origin of the Xiongnu, recognizing all of the earliest Xiongnu names of the 2nd century BC as being of the Iranian type. Central Asian scholar Christopher I. Beckwith notes that the Xiongnu name could be a cognate of Scythian, Saka and Sogdia, corresponding to a name for Eastern Iranian Scythians. According to Beckwith the Xiongnu could have contained a leading Iranian component when they started out, but more likely they had earlier been subjects of an Iranian people and learned the Iranian nomadic model from them.

In the 1994 UNESCO-published History of Civilizations of Central Asia, its editor János Harmatta claims that the royal tribes and kings of the Xiongnu bore Iranian names, that all Xiongnu words noted by the Chinese can be explained from a Scythian language, and that it is therefore clear that the majority of Xiongnu tribes spoke an Eastern Iranian language.

According to a study by Alexander Savelyev and Choongwon Jeong, published in 2020 in the journal Evolutionary Human Sciences, "The predominant part of the Xiongnu population is likely to have spoken Turkic". However, important cultural, technological and political elements may have been transmitted by Eastern Iranian-speaking Steppe nomads: "Arguably, these Iranian-speaking groups were assimilated over time by the predominant Turkic-speaking part of the Xiongnu population".

=== Yeniseian theories ===
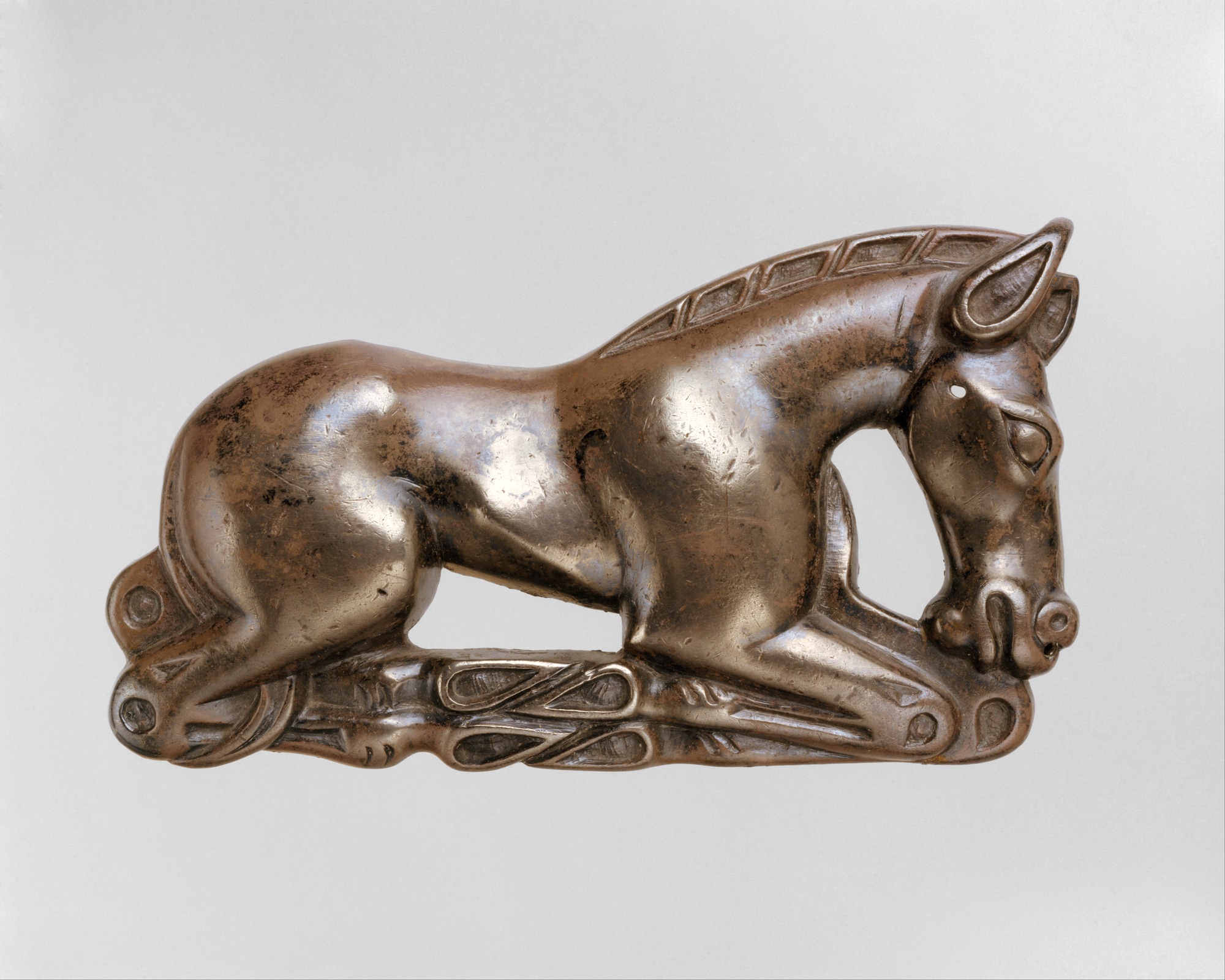
Belt plaque in the shape of a kneeling horse, 3rd–1st century BC, gilded silver, made in North China for Xiongnu patrons.

Lajos Ligeti was the first to suggest that the Xiongnu spoke a Yeniseian language. In the early 1960s Edwin Pulleyblank was the first to expand upon this idea with credible evidence. The Yeniseian theory proposes that the Jie, a western Xiongnu people, spoke a Yeniseian language. Hyun Jin Kim notes that the 7th century AD Chinese conpendium, Jin Shu, contains a transliterated song of Jie origin, which appears to be Yeniseian. This song has led researchers Pulleyblank and Vovin to argue for a Yeniseian Jie dominant minority, that ruled over the other Xiongnu ethnicities, such as Iranian and Turkic people. Kim has stated that the dominant Xiongnu language was likely Turkic or Yeniseian, but has cautioned that the Xiongnu were definitely a multi-ethnic society.

Pulleybank and D. N. Keightley asserted that the Xiongnu titles "were originally Paleo-Siberian words but were later borrowed by the Turkic and Mongolic peoples". Titles such as tarqan, tegin and kaghan were also inherited from the Xiongnu language and are possibly of Yeniseian origin. For example, the Xiongnu word for "heaven" is theorized to come from Proto-Yeniseian *tɨŋVr.

Vocabulary from Xiongnu inscriptions sometimes appears to have Yeniseian cognates which were used by Vovin to support his theory that the Xiongnu has a large Yeniseian component, examples of proposed cognates include words such as Xiongnu kʷala 'son' and Ket qalek 'younger son', Xiongnu sakdak 'boot' and Ket sagdi 'boot', Xiongnu gʷawa "prince" and Ket gij "prince", Xiongnu "attij" 'wife' and proto-Yeniseian "alrit", Ket "alit" and Xiongnu dar "north" compared to Yugh tɨr "north". Pulleyblank also argued that because Xiongnu words appear to have clusters with r and l, in the beginning of the word it is unlikely to be of Turkic origin, and instead believed that most vocabulary we have mostly resemble Yeniseian languages.

Alexander Vovin also wrote, that some names of horses in the Xiongnu language appear to be Turkic words with Yeniseian prefixes.

An analysis by Savelyev and Jeong (2020) has cast doubt on the Yeniseian theory. If assuming that the ancient Yeniseians were represented by modern Ket people, who are more genetically similar to Samoyedic speakers, the Xiongnu do not display a genetic affinity for Yeniseian peoples. A review by Wilson (2023) argues that the presence of Yeniseian-speakers among the multi-ethnic Xiongnu should not be rejected, and that "Yeniseian-speaking peoples must have played a more prominent (than heretofore recognized) role in the history of Eurasia during the first millennium of the Common Era".

Bonmann and Fries (2025) argued that the Xiongnu and succeeding Huns were of multi-ethnic origin, but had, at least a partial, Paleo-Siberian, specifically Yeniseian ethnic core, corresponding to the early Arin language.

=== Turkic theories ===
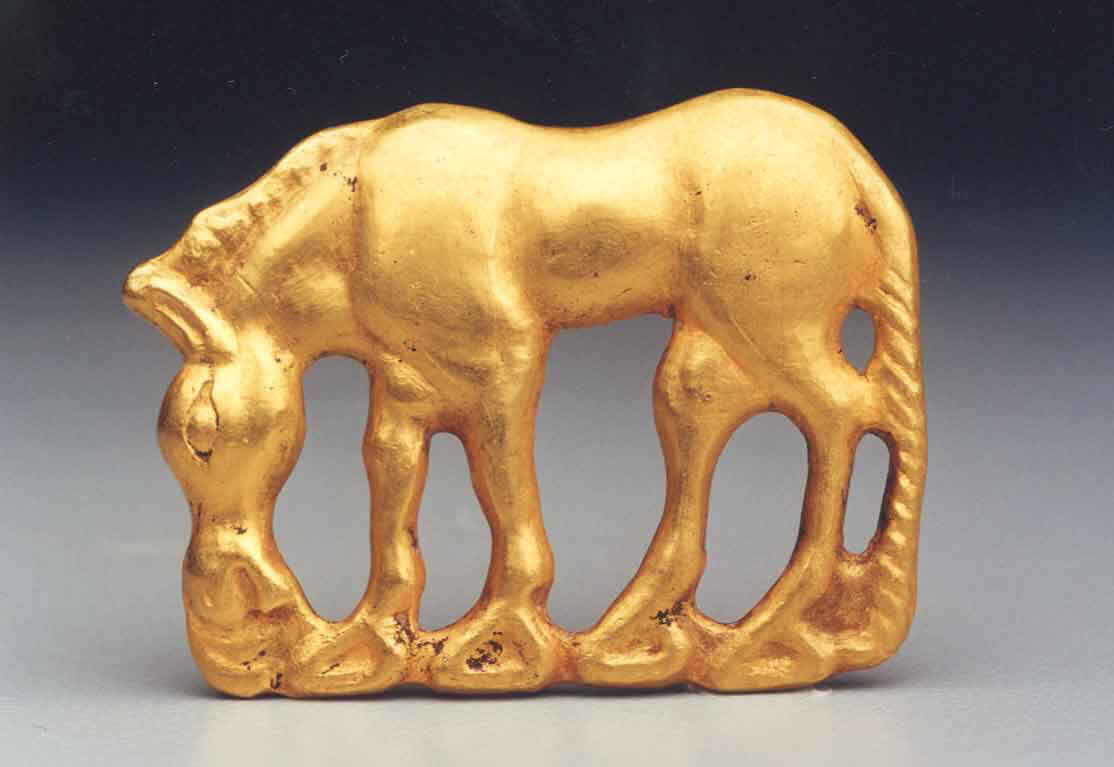
Plaque in the shape of a grazing kulan (wild ass), 2nd–1st century BC, Northwest China, Xiongnu culture.

According to a study by Alexander Savelyev and Choongwon Jeong, published in 2020 in the journal Evolutionary Human Sciences, "The predominant part of the Xiongnu population is likely to have spoken Turkic". However, genetic studies found a mixture of haplogroups from western and eastern Eurasian origins that suggested large genetic diversity, and possibly multiple origins of Xiongnu elites. The Turkic-related component may be brought by eastern Eurasian genetic substratum.

Other proponents of a Turkic language theory include E.H. Parker, Jean-Pierre Abel-Rémusat, Julius Klaproth, Gustaf John Ramstedt, Annemarie von Gabain, and Charles Hucker. André Wink states that the Xiongnu probably spoke an early form of Turkic; even if Xiongnu were not "Turks" nor Turkic-speaking, they were in close contact with Turkic-speakers very early on. Craig Benjamin sees the Xiongnu as either proto-Turks or proto-Mongols who possibly spoke a language related to the Dingling.

Chinese sources link several Turkic peoples to the Xiongnu:

- According to the Book of Zhou, History of the Northern Dynasties, Tongdian, New Book of Tang, the Göktürks and the ruling Ashina clan was a component of the Xiongnu confederation,
  - However, the Ashina-surnamed Göktürks were also stated to be they were "mixed barbarians" (雜胡; záhú) who fled from Pingliang (now in modern Gansu province, China). or from an obscure Suo state (索國), north of the Xiongnu.
- Uyghur Khagans claimed descent from the Xiongnu (according to Chinese history Weishu, the founder of the Uyghur Khaganate was descended from a Xiongnu ruler).
- The Book of Wei states that the Yueban descended from remnants of the Northern Xiongnu chanyu's tribe and that Yueban's language and customs resembled Gaoche (高車), another name of the Tiele.
- The Book of Jin lists 19 southern Xiongnu tribes who entered the northern Chinese borders, the 14th being the Alat (Ch. 賀賴 Helai ~ 賀蘭 Helan ~ 曷剌 Hela); Alat being glossed "piebald horse" (Ch. 駁馬 ~ 駮馬 Boma) in Old Turkic.

Bonmann & Fries (2025) criticize Turkic theories, believing that the Turkic identification of the Xiongnu and their language is impossible. They argue that the hypothesis of a Turkic identity for the Xiongnu is "rather unlikely from the outset", since there is "neither direct nor indirect evidence" supporting the claim of any sort of Turkic presence in Inner Asia between the 3rd century BC and the 2nd century AD, let alone amongst the Xiongnu. They also note that such arguments rely primarily on written sources dating after the Xiongnu period, whereas the earliest secure evidence for Turkic languages appears much later. They conclude that the available evidence does not substantiate a Turkic linguistic presence among the Xiongnu during the period of their empire.

Chinese sources also ascribe Xiongnu origins to the Para-Mongolic-speaking Kumo Xi and Khitans.

=== Mongolic theories ===
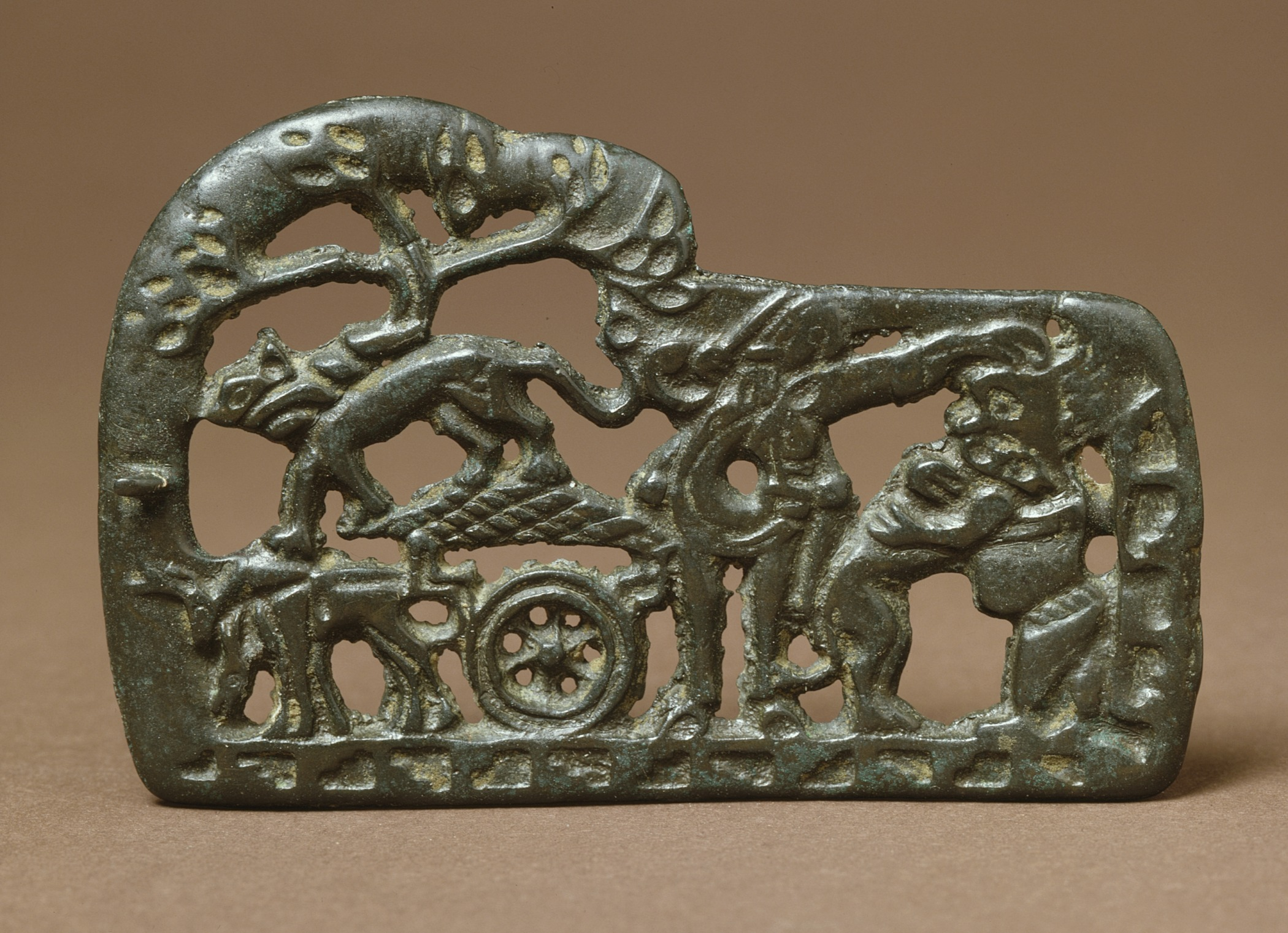
Belt Buckle, 2nd–1st century BC, Xiongnu. Another naturalistic belt buckle made to the Xiongnu taste, showing a mounted warrior frontally, holding a dagger and grabbing the hair of a demon who is also attacked by a dog. Also appears a nomadic cart pulled by reindeers, and another dog on top of the cart.

Mongolian and other scholars have suggested that the Xiongnu spoke a language related to the Mongolic languages. Mongolian archaeologists proposed that the Slab Grave Culture people were the ancestors of the Xiongnu, and some scholars have suggested that the Xiongnu may have been the ancestors of the Mongols. Nikita Bichurin considered Xiongnu and Xianbei to be two subgroups (or dynasties) of but one same ethnicity.

According to the Book of Song, the Rourans, which the Book of Wei identified as offspring of Proto-Mongolic Donghu people, possessed the alternative name(s) 大檀 Dàtán "Tatar" and/or 檀檀 Tántán "Tartar" and according to the Book of Liang, "they also constituted a separate branch of the Xiongnu". The Old Book of Tang mentioned twenty Shiwei tribes, which other Chinese sources (the Book of Sui and the New Book of Tang) associated with the Khitans, another people who in turn descended from the Xianbei and were also associated with the Xiongnu. While the Xianbei, Khitans, and Shiwei are generally believed to be predominantly Mongolic- and Para-Mongolic-speaking, yet Xianbei were stated to descend from the Donghu, whom Sima Qian distinguished from the Xiongnu (notwithstanding Sima Qian's inconsistency). Additionally, Chinese chroniclers routinely ascribed Xiongnu origins to various nomadic groups: for examples, Xiongnu ancestry was ascribed to Para-Mongolic-speaking Kumo Xi, as well as the Turkic-speaking Göktürks and Tiele;

Genghis Khan refers to the time of Modu Chanyu as "the remote times of our chanyu" in his letter to Daoist Qiu Chuji. Moreover, the sun and moon symbol of Xiongnu discovered by archaeologists is similar to Mongolian Soyombo symbol.

=== Multiple ethnicities ===
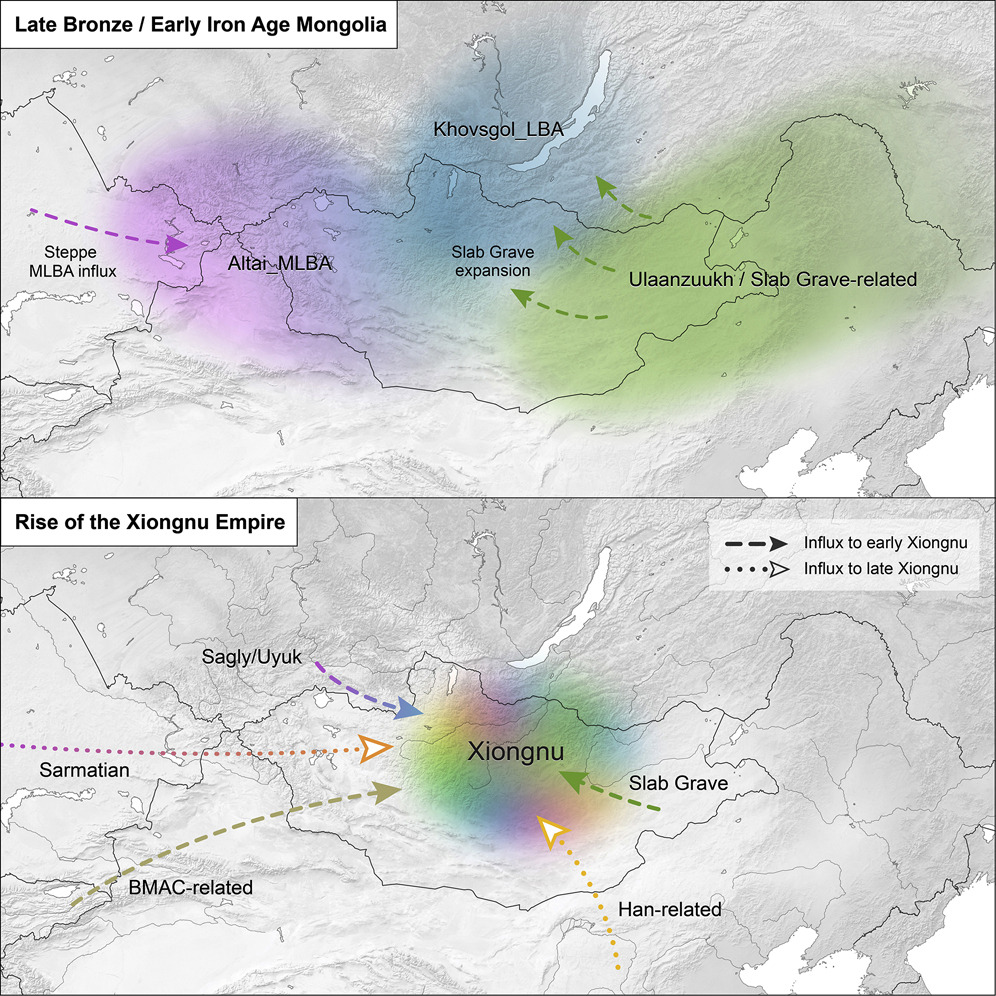
Pastoralist expansion into Mongolia c. 1000 BC (Early Iron Age), and schematic formation of the Xiongnu Empire in the 3rd century BC.

Since the early 19th century, a number of Western scholars have proposed a connection between various language families or subfamilies and the language or languages of the Xiongnu. Albert Terrien de Lacouperie considered them to be multi-component groups. Many scholars believe the Xiongnu confederation was a mixture of different ethno-linguistic groups, and that their main language (as represented in the Chinese sources) and its relationships have not yet been satisfactorily determined. Kim rejects "old racial theories or even ethnic affiliations" in favour of the "historical reality of these extensive, multiethnic, polyglot steppe empires".

Chinese sources link the Tiele people and Ashina to the Xiongnu, not all Turkic peoples. According to the Book of Zhou and the History of the Northern Dynasties, the Ashina clan was a component of the Xiongnu confederation, but this connection is disputed, and according to the Book of Sui and the Tongdian, they were "mixed nomads" (traditional Chinese: 雜胡; simplified Chinese: 杂胡; pinyin: zá hú) from Pingliang. The Ashina and Tiele may have been separate ethnic groups who mixed with the Xiongnu. Indeed, Chinese sources link many nomadic peoples (hu; see Wu Hu) on their northern borders to the Xiongnu, just as Greco-Roman historiographers called Avars and Huns "Scythians". The Greek cognate of Tourkia (Greek: Τουρκία) was used by the Byzantine emperor and scholar Constantine VII in his book De Administrando Imperio, though in his use, "Turks" always referred to Magyars. Such archaizing was a common literary topos, and implied similar geographic origins and nomadic lifestyle but not direct filiation.

Some Uyghurs claimed descent from the Xiongnu (according to Chinese history Weishu, the founder of the Uyghur Khaganate was descended from a Xiongnu ruler), but many contemporary scholars do not consider the modern Uyghurs to be of direct linear descent from the old Uyghur Khaganate because modern Uyghur language and Old Uyghur languages are different. Rather, they consider them to be descendants of a number of people, one of them the ancient Uyghurs.

In various kinds of ancient inscriptions on monuments of Munmu of Silla, it is recorded that King Munmu had Xiongnu ancestry. According to several historians, it is possible that there were tribes of Koreanic origin. There are also some Korean researchers that point out that the grave goods of Silla and of the eastern Xiongnu are alike.

=== Language isolate theories ===
Turkologist Gerhard Doerfer has denied any possibility of a relationship between the Xiongnu language and any other known language, even any connection with Turkic or Mongolian.

== Geographic origins ==
The original geographic location of the Xiongnu is disputed among steppe archaeologists. Since the 1960s, the geographic origin of the Xiongnu has attempted to be traced through an analysis of Early Iron Age burial constructions. No region has been proven to have mortuary practices that clearly match those of the Xiongnu.

=== Archaeology ===
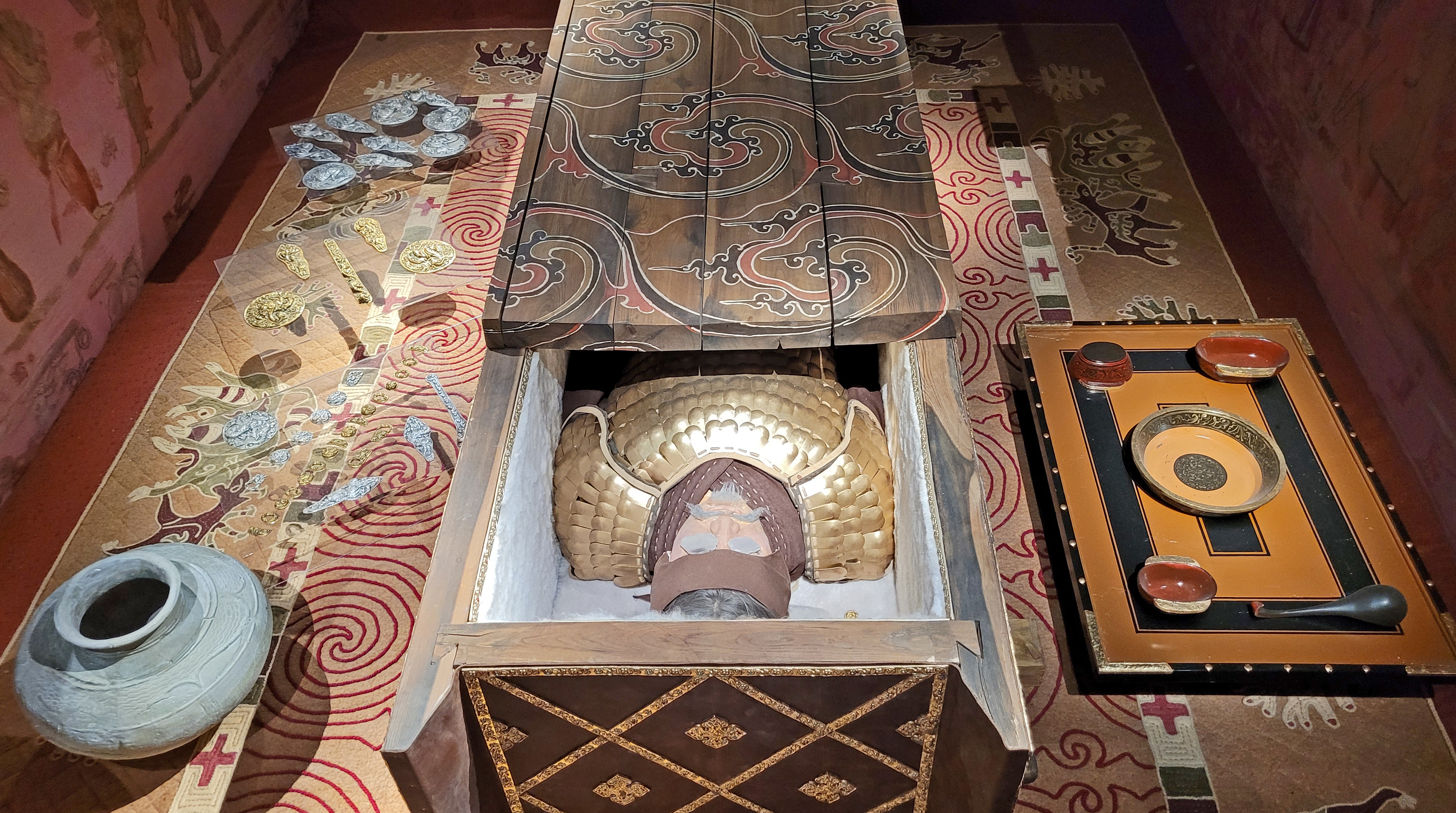
Reconstruction of a Xiongnu burial at the Noin-Ula burial site.

In the 1920s, Pyotr Kozlov oversaw the excavation of royal tombs at the Noin-Ula burial site in northern Mongolia, dated to around the first century AD. Other Xiongnu sites have been unearthed in Inner Mongolia, such as the Ordos culture. Sinologist Otto Maenchen-Helfen has said that depictions of the Xiongnu of Transbaikalia and the Ordos commonly show individuals with West Eurasian features. Iaroslav Lebedynsky said that West Eurasian depictions in the Ordos region should be attributed to a "Scythian affinity".

Portraits found in the Noin-Ula excavations demonstrate other cultural evidence and influences, showing that Chinese and Xiongnu art influenced each other mutually. Some of these embroidered portraits in the Noin-Ula kurgans also depict the Xiongnu with long braided hair with wide ribbons, which is seen to be identical with the Ashina clan hair-style. Well-preserved bodies in Xiongnu and pre-Xiongnu tombs in Mongolia and southern Siberia show both East Asian and West Eurasian features.

Analysis of cranial remains from some sites attributed to the Xiongnu have revealed that they had dolichocephalic skulls with East Asian craniometrical features, setting them apart from neighboring populations in present-day Mongolia. Russian and Chinese anthropological and craniofacial studies show that the Xiongnu were physically very heterogenous, with six different population clusters showing different degrees of West Eurasian and East Asian physical traits.

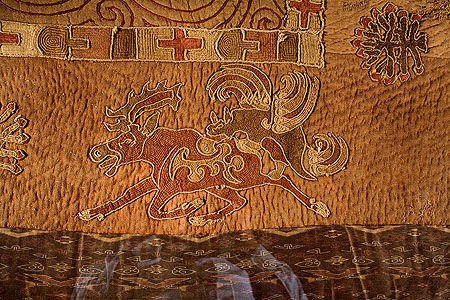
Noin-Ula carpet, animal style. 1st century AD.

Presently, there exist four fully excavated and well documented cemeteries: Ivolga, Dyrestui, Burkhan Tolgoi, and Daodunzi. Additionally thousands of tombs have been recorded in Transbaikalia and Mongolia.

The archaeologists at a Xiongnu cemetery in Arkhangai Province said the following:

"There is no clear indication of the ethnicity of this tomb occupant, but in a similar brick-chambered tomb of the late Eastern Han period at the same cemetery, archaeologists discovered a bronze seal with the official title that the Han government bestowed upon the leader of the Xiongnu. The excavators suggested that these brick chamber tombs all belong to the Xiongnu (Qinghai 1993)."

Classifications of these burial sites make distinction between two prevailing type of burials: "(1) monumental ramped terrace tombs which are often flanked by smaller "satellite" burials and (2) 'circular' or 'ring' burials." Some scholars consider this a division between "elite" graves and "commoner" graves. Other scholars, find this division too simplistic and not evocative of a true distinction because it shows "ignorance of the nature of the mortuary investments and typically luxuriant burial assemblages [and does not account for] the discovery of other lesser interments that do not qualify as either of these types."

== Genetics ==
=== Maternal lineages ===
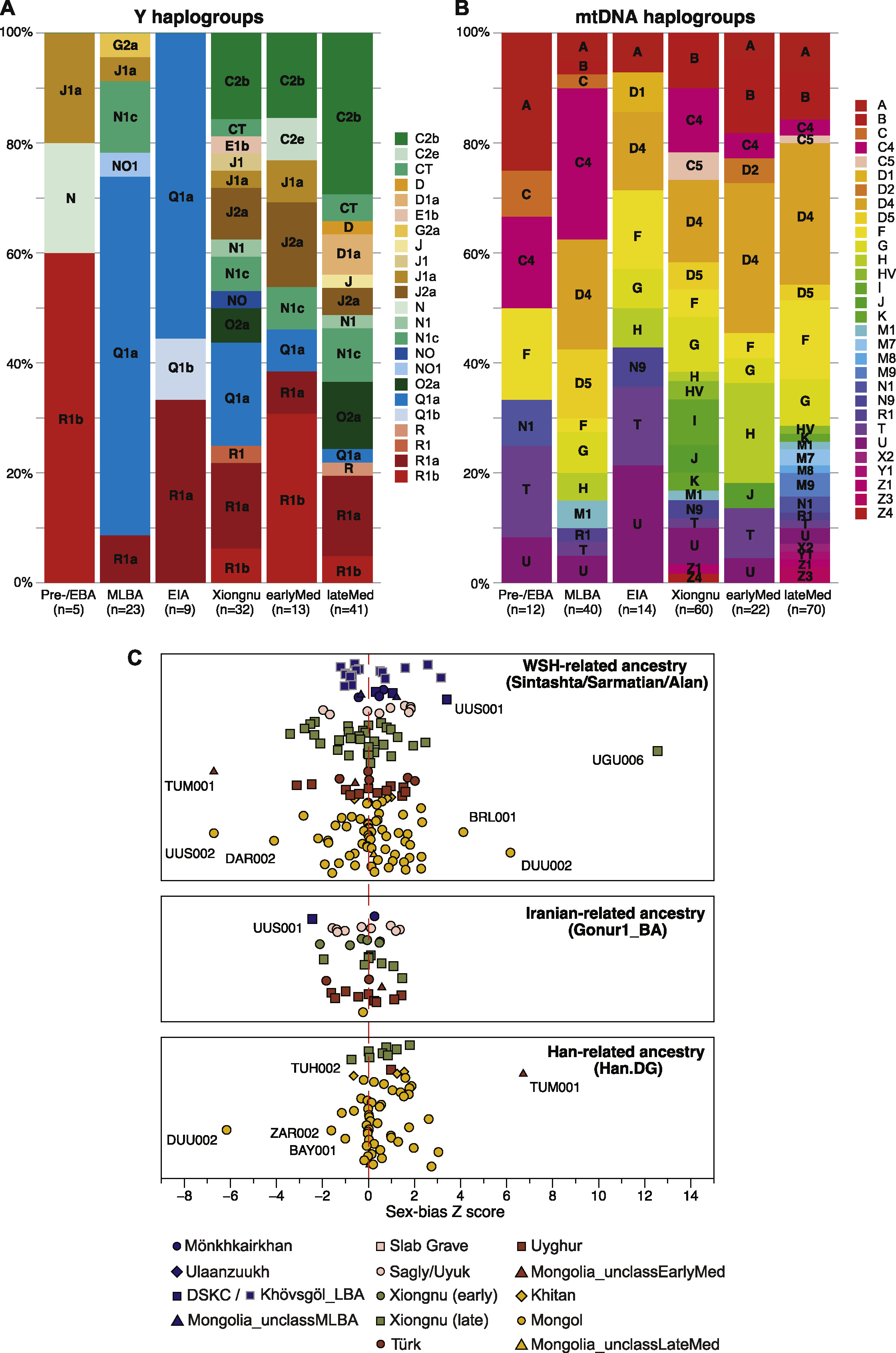
Uniparental haplogroup assignments by group and sex-bias "z" scores of Xiongnu.

A 2003 study found that 89% of Xiongnu maternal lineages are of East Asian origin, while 11% were of West Eurasian origin. However, a 2016 study found that 37.5% of Xiongnu maternal lineages were West Eurasian, in a central Mongolian sample.

According to Rogers & Kaestle (2022), these studies make clear that the Xiongnu population is extremely similar to the preceding Slab Grave population, which had a similar frequency of Eastern and Western maternal haplogroups, supporting a hypothesis of continuity from the Slab Grave period to the Xiongnu. They wrote that the bulk of the genetics research indicates that roughly 27% of Xiongnu maternal haplogroups were of West Eurasian origin, while the rest were East Asian.

Some examples of maternal haplogroups observed in Xiongnu specimens include D4b2b4, N9a2a, G3a3, D4a6 and D4b2b2b. and U2e1.

=== Paternal lineages ===
According to Rogers & Kaestle (2022), roughly 47% of Xiongnu period remains belonged to paternal haplogroups associated with modern West Eurasians, while the rest (53%) belonged to East Asian haplogroups. They observed that this contrasts strongly with the preceding Slab Grave period, which was dominated by East Asian patrilineages. They suggest that this may reflect an aggressive expansion of people with West Eurasian paternal haplogroups, or perhaps the practice of marriage alliances or cultural networks favoring people with Western patrilines.

Some examples of paternal haplogroups in Xiongnu specimens include C2, Q1b, R1, R1b, O3a and O3a3b2, , J2a, J1a and E1b1b1a.

According to Lee & Kuang, the main paternal lineages of Xiongnu Elite remains in the Egiin Gol valley belonged to the paternal haplogroups N1c1, Q-M242, and C-M217. Xiongnu remains from Barkol belonged exclusively to haplogroup Q-M242. They argue that the haplogroups Q, N and C2 likely formed the major paternal haplogroups of the Xiongnu tribes, while R1a was the most common paternal haplogroup (44.5%) among neighbouring nomads from the Altai Mountains, who were probably incorporated into the Xiongnu confederation and may be associated with the Jie people. Alternatively, if the Jie, who formed a separate branch of the Xiongnu that founded the Later Zhao Dynasty (319–351 AD), were indeed a Yeniseian-speaking people, they may have been carriers of haplogroup Q and resembled modern-day Kets of central Siberia. Elite Xiongnu samples from Duurlig Nars belonged to R1a1 and to C-M217, while elite Xiongnu remains from Tamir Ulaan Khoshuu beloged to R1a-Z95, R1a-Z2125, Q1a-M120, J1 and N1a1. According to Juhyeon Lee sample DA39, a likely chanyu of the Xiongnu empire from Gol Mod 2 site in central-north Mongolia was assigned to haplogroup R1 and nobility from Shombuuzyn Belchir, samples SBB009, SBB010 and SBB001 belonged to haplogroup C-F1756. Högström et al. (2024) later reassigned DA39 to haplogroup R-Y56311.

=== Autosomal ancestry ===
A study published in the American Journal of Physical Anthropology in October 2006 detected significant genetic continuity between the examined individuals at Egyin Gol and modern Mongolians.

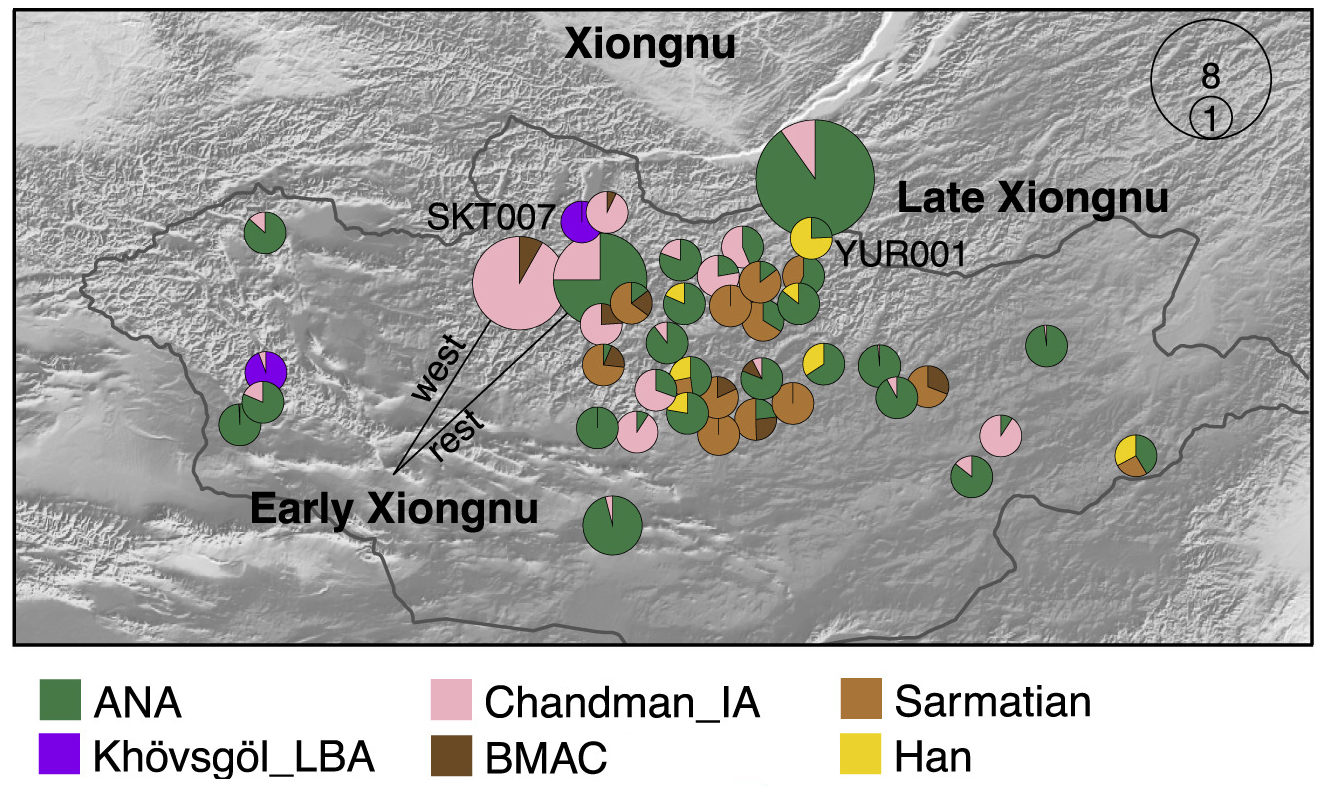
Mapping of Xiongnu ancestry per burial sites in Mongolia. Ancient Northeast Asians (ANA , Khövsgöl ) form the main contribution, followed by the hybrid Saka culture (Chandman ), and smaller contributions of Han, BMAC and Sarmatian.

A genetic study published in Nature in May 2018 examined the remains of five Xiongnu. The study concluded that Xiongnu confederation was genetically heterogeneous, and Xiongnu individuals belonging to two distinct groups, one being of primarily East Asian origin (associated with the earlier Slab-grave culture) and the other presenting considerable admixture levels with West Eurasian (possibly from Central Saka) sources. The evidence suggested that the Huns probably emerged through minor male-driven geneflow into the Saka through westward migrations of the Xiongnu.

A study published in November 2020 examined 60 early and late Xiongnu individuals from across Mongolia. The study found that the Xiongnu resulted from the admixture of three different clusters from the Mongolian region. The two early genetic clusters are "early Xiongnu_west" from the Altai Mountains (formed at 92% by the hybrid Eurasian Chandman ancestry, and 8% BMAC ancestry), and "early Xiongnu_rest" from the Mongolian Plateau (individuals with primarily Ulaanzuukh-Slab Grave ancestry, or mixed with "early Xiongnu_west"). The later third cluster named "late Xiongnu" has even higher heterogenity, with the continued combination of Chandman and Ulaanzuukh-Slab Grave ancestry, and additional geneflow from Sarmatian and Han Chinese sources. Their uniparental haplogroup assignments also showed heterogenetic influence on their ethnogenesis as well as their connection with Huns. In contrast, the later Mongols had a much higher eastern Eurasian ancestry as a whole, similar to that of modern-day Mongolic-speaking populations.

A Xiongnu remain (GD1-4) analysed in a 2024 study was found to be entirely derived from Ancient Northeast Asians without any West Eurasian-associated ancestry. The sample clustered closely with a Göktürk remain (GD1-1) from the later Turkic period.

==== Relationship between ethnicity and status among the Xiongnu ====
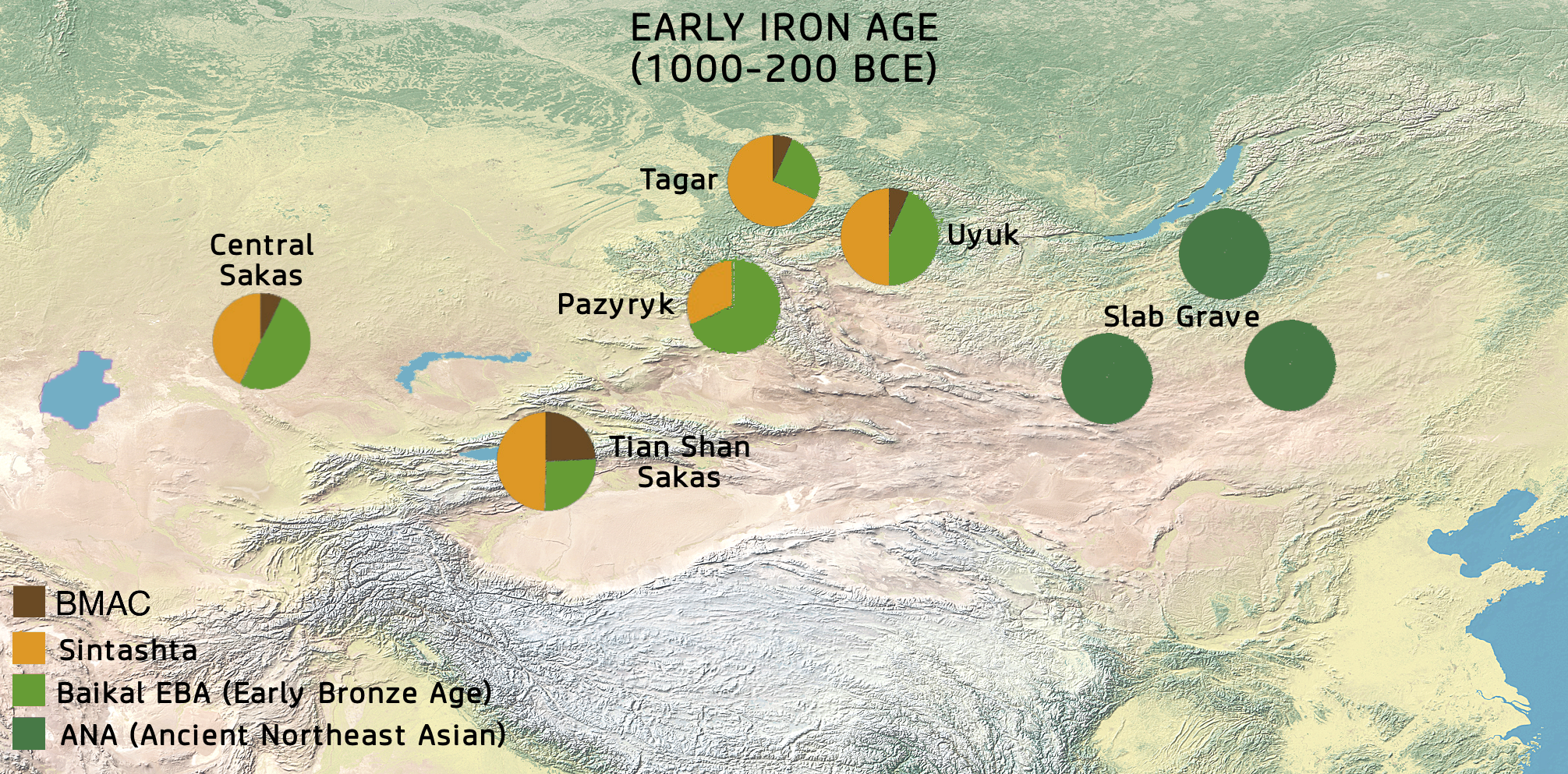
Pre-Xiongnu populations. The Slab-grave people were uniformly of Ancient Northeast Asian origin (ANA ), while Saka populations to the west combined Sintashta ( ) and Ancient Northeast Asian (Baikal EBA ) ancestry, with some BMAC component.

Although the Xiongnu were ethnically heterogeneous as a whole, it appears that variability was highly related to social status. Genetic heterogeneity was highest among retainers of low status, as identified by their smaller and peripheral tombs. These retainers mainly displayed ancestry related to the Chandman/Uyuk culture (characterized by a hybrid Eurasian gene pool combining the genetic profile of the Sintashta culture and Baikal hunter-gatherers, otherwise known as Baikal EBA), or various combinations of Chandman/Uyuk and Ancient Northeast Asian Ulaanzuukh/Slab Grave profiles.

On the contrary, high status Xiongnu individuals tended to have less genetic diversity, and their ancestry was essentially derived from East Eurasian-related Ulaanzuukh/Slab Grave culture groups, or alternatively from the Xianbei, suggesting multiple sources for their Eastern ancestry. High East Eurasian ancestry was more common among high status female samples, while low status male samples tended to be more diverse and West Eurasian shifted. DA39, a likely chanyu identified by his prestigious tomb, was shown to have had similar ancestry as a high status female in the "western frontiers", deriving about 39.3% Slab Grave (or Ancient Northeast Asian) genetic ancestry, 51.9% Han (or Yellow River farmers) ancestry, with the rest (8.8%) being Saka (Chandman) ancestry.

== Culture ==
=== Art ===
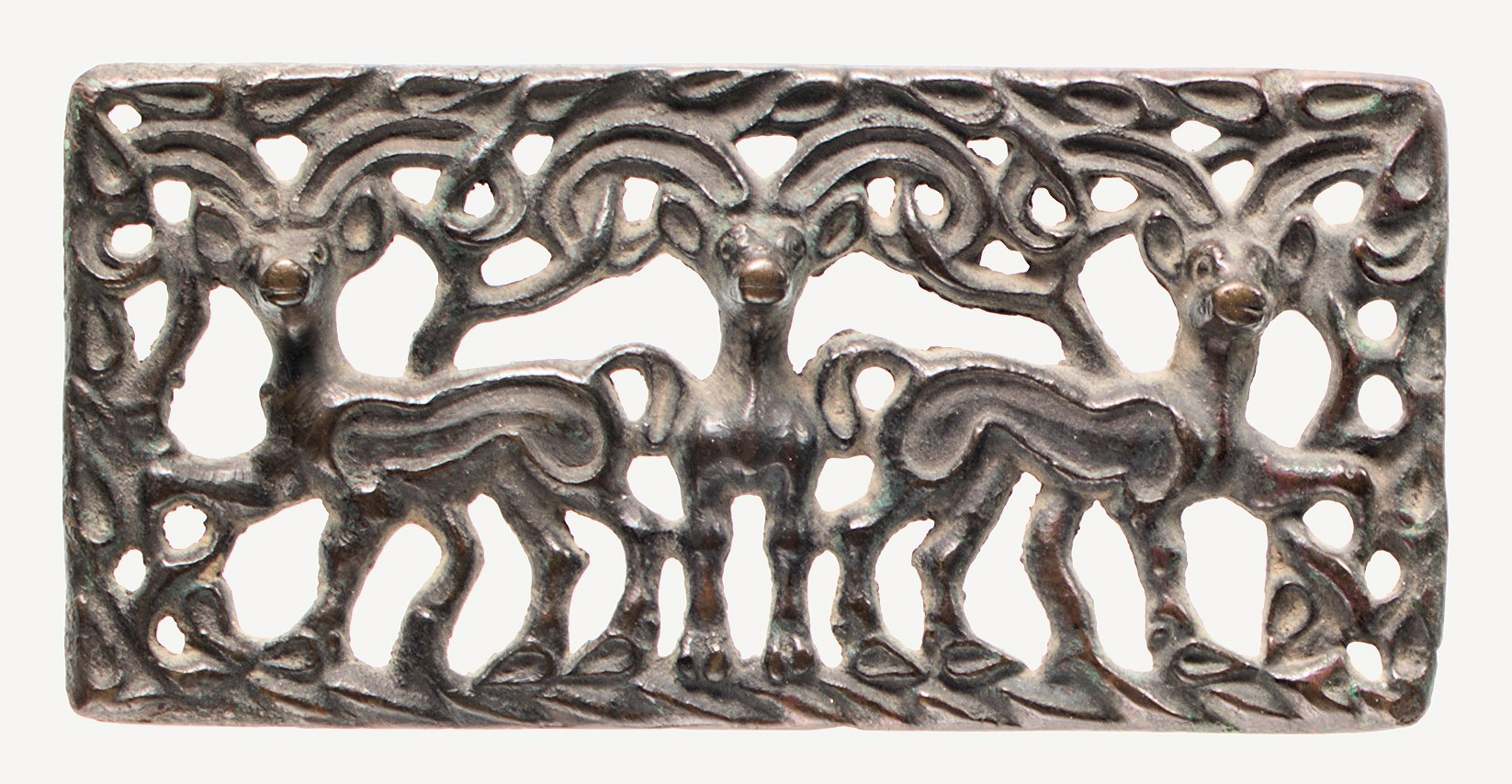
Belt buckle with three Ibexes, 2nd–1st century BC, Xiongnu.

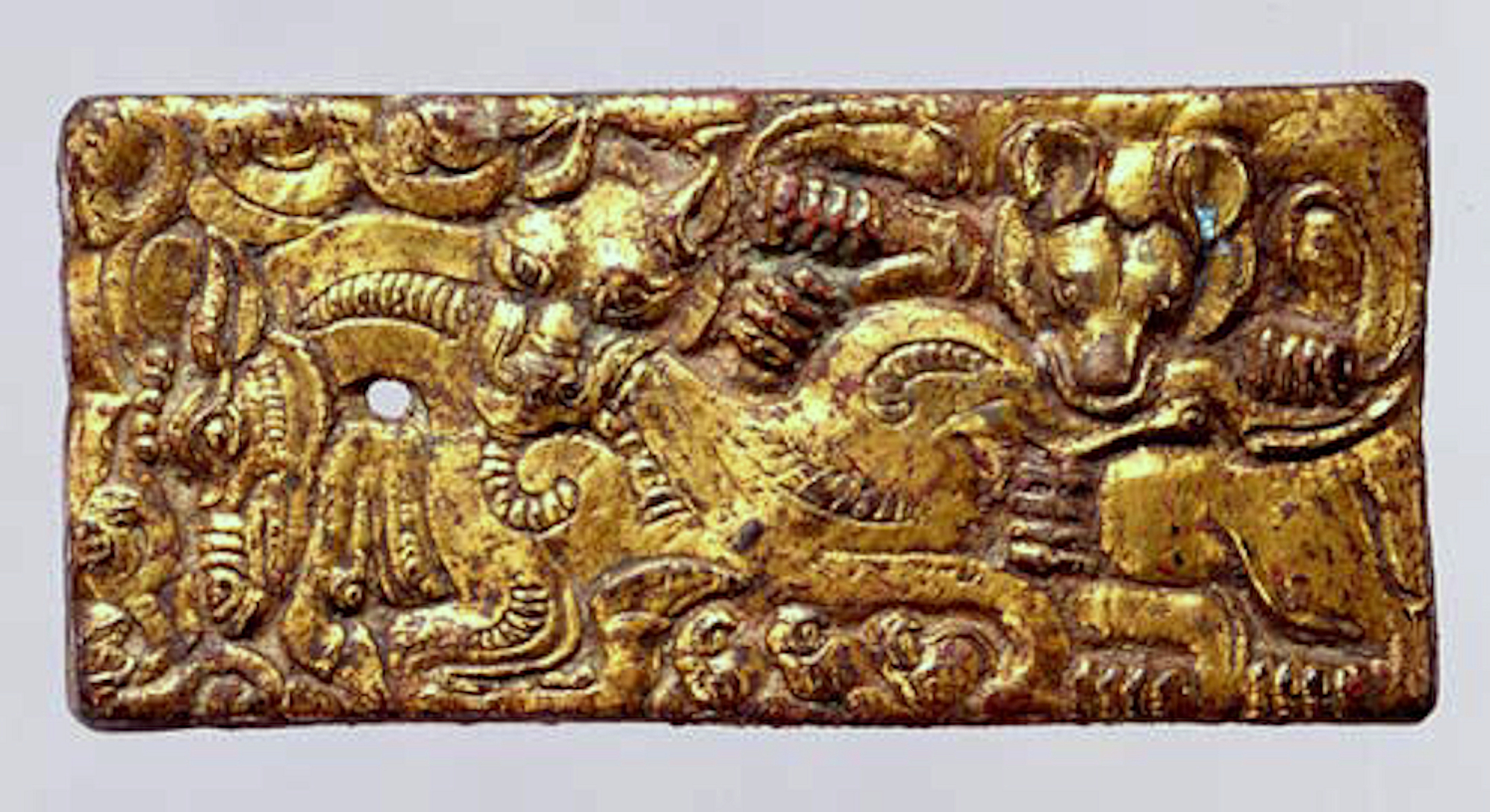
Belt buckle with animal combat scene, 2nd – 1st century BC, made in North China for the Xiongnu.

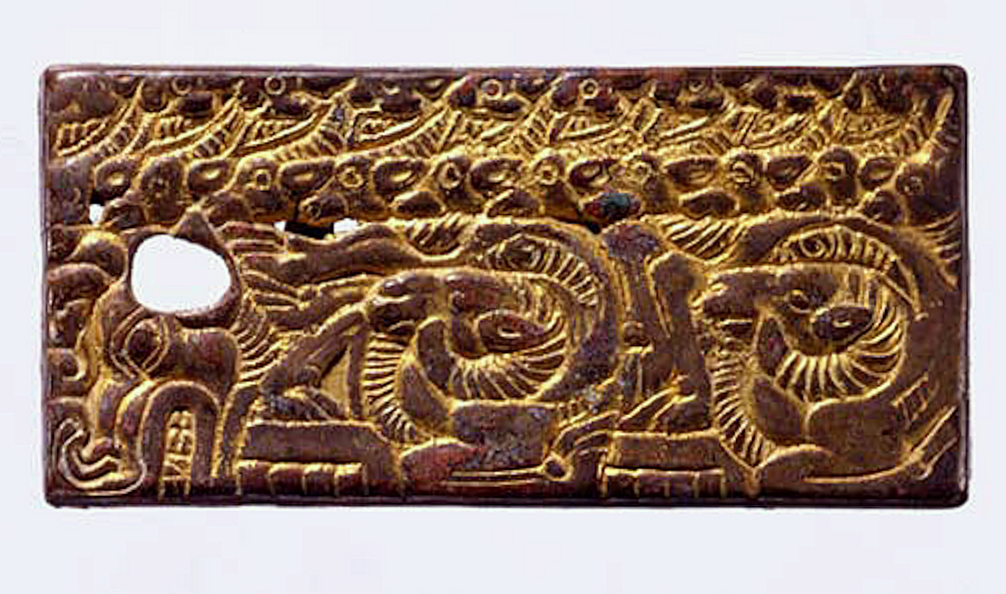
Belt Buckle with nomadic-inspired zoomorphic design, manufactured in China for the Xiongnu.

Within the Xiongnu culture more variety is visible from site to site than from "era" to "era," in terms of Chinese chronology, yet all form a whole that is distinct from that of the Han and other peoples of the non-Chinese north. In some instances, the iconography cannot be used as the main cultural identifier, because art depicting animal predation is common among the steppe peoples. An example of animal predation associated with Xiongnu culture is that of a tiger carrying dead prey. A similar motif appears in work from Maoqinggou, a site which is presumed to have been under Xiongnu political control but is still clearly non-Xiongnu. In the Maoqinggou example, the prey is replaced with an extension of the tiger's foot. The work also depicts a cruder level of execution; Maoqinggou work was executed in a rounder, less detailed style. In its broadest sense, Xiongnu iconography of animal predation includes examples such as the gold headdress from Aluchaideng and gold earrings with a turquoise and jade inlay discovered in Xigoupan, Inner Mongolia.

Xiongnu art is harder to distinguish from Saka or Scythian art. There is a similarity present in stylistic execution, but Xiongnu art and Saka art often differ in terms of iconography. Saka art does not appear to have included predation scenes, especially with dead prey, or same-animal combat. Additionally, Saka art included elements not common to Xiongnu iconography, such as winged, horned horses. The two cultures also used two different kinds of bird heads. Xiongnu depictions of birds tend to have a medium-sized eye and beak, and they are also depicted with ears, while Saka birds have a pronounced eye and beak, and no ears. Some scholars claim these differences are indicative of cultural differences. Scholar Sophia-Karin Psarras suggests that Xiongnu images of animal predation, specifically tiger-and-prey, are a spiritual representation of death and rebirth, and that same-animal combat is representative of the acquisition or maintenance of power.

=== Rock art and writing ===
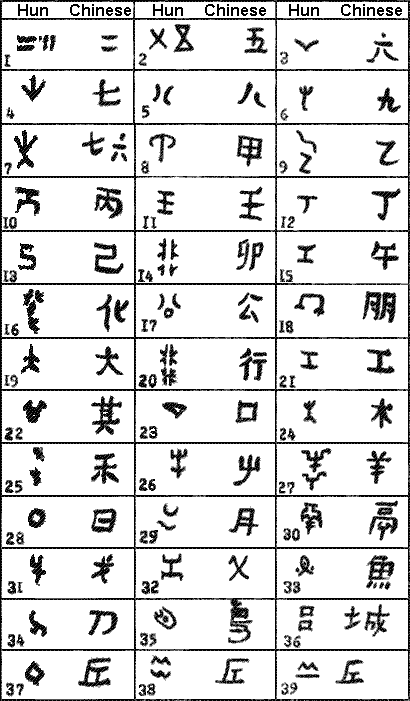
2nd century BC – 2nd century AD characters of Xiongnu-Xianbei script (Mongolia and Inner Mongolia).

The rock art of the Yin and Helan Mountains is dated from the 9th millennium BC to the 19th century AD. It consists mainly of engraved signs (petroglyphs) and only minimally of painted images.

Chinese sources indicate that the Xiongnu did not have an ideographic form of writing like Chinese, but in the 2nd century BC, a renegade Chinese dignitary Yue "taught the Shanyu to write official letters to the Chinese court on a wooden tablet 31 cm (12 in) long, and to use a seal and large-sized folder." The same sources tell that when the Xiongnu noted down something or transmitted a message, they made cuts on a piece of wood ('ke-mu'), and they also mention a "Hu script" (vol. 110). At Noin-Ula and other Xiongnu burial sites in Mongolia and the region north of Lake Baikal, among the objects discovered during excavations conducted in 1924 and 1925 were over 20 carved characters. Most of these characters are either identical or very similar to letters of the Old Turkic alphabet of the Early Middle Ages found on the Eurasian steppes. From this, some specialists conclude that the Xiongnu used a script similar to the ancient Eurasian runiform, and that this alphabet was a basis for later Turkic writing.

=== Religion and diet ===
According to the Book of Han, the Xiongnu called Heaven (天) 'Chēnglí,' (撐犁) a Chinese transcription of Tengri. The Xiongnu were a nomadic people. From their lifestyle of herding flocks and their horse-trade with China, it can be concluded that their diet consisted mainly of mutton, horse meat and wild geese that were shot down.

Historical evidence gives reason to believe that, from the 2nd century BC, proto-Mongol peoples (the Xiongnu, Xianbei, and Khitans) were familiar with Buddhism. Remains of Buddhist prayer beads were found in a Xiongnu grave in Ivolginsky District.

== See also ==
- Ban Yong
- Ethnic groups in Chinese history
- History of the Han dynasty
- List of largest empires
- List of Xiongnu chanyus
- Nomadic empire
- Ordos culture
- Rulers family tree
- Zubu

== Sources ==
=== Primary sources ===
- Ban Gu et al., Book of Han, esp. vol. 94, part 1, part 2.
- Fan Ye et al., Book of the Later Han, esp. vol. 89.
- Sima Qian et al., Records of the Grand Historian, esp. vol. 110.

=== Other sources consulted ===
- Adas, Michael (2001). Agricultural and Pastoral Societies in Ancient and Classical History. American Historical Association/Temple University Press.
- Bailey, Harold W. (1985). Indo-Scythian Studies: being Khotanese Texts, VII. Cambridge University Press. JSTOR 312539.
- Barfield, Thomas J. (1989). The Perilous Frontier: Nomadic Empires and China, 221 BC to AD 1757. Basil Blackwell.
- Beckwith, Christopher I. (16 March 2009). Empires of the Silk Road: A History of Central Eurasia from the Bronze Age to the Present. Princeton University Press. ISBN 978-0-691-13589-2.
- Bentley, Jerry (1993). Old World Encounters: Cross-Cultural Contacts and Exchanges in Pre-Modern Times. New York: Oxford University Press.
- Bunker, Emma C. (2002). Nomadic Art of the Eastern Eurasian Steppes: The Eugene V. Thaw and Other Notable New York Collections. New York: Metropolitan Museum of Art. ISBN 978-0-300-09688-0. OCLC 819761397 – via Internet Archive. ("Via Metropolitan Museum of Art Libraries". Archived from the original on 2013-12-03.)
- Christian, David (1998). A history of Russia, Central Asia and Mongolia, Vol. 1: Inner Eurasia from prehistory to the Mongol Empire. Blackwell.
- Damgaard, Peter de Barros; Marchi, Nina; Rasmussen, Simon; Peyrot, Michaël; Renaud, Gabriel; Korneliussen, Thorfinn; Moreno-Mayar, J. Víctor; Pedersen, Mikkel Winther; Goldberg, Amy; Usmanova, Emma; Baimukhanov, Nurbol; Loman, Valeriy; Hedeager, Lotte; Pedersen, Anders Gorm; Nielsen, Kasper; Afanasiev, Gennady; Akmatov, Kunbolot; Aldashev, Almaz; Alpaslan, Ashyk; Baimbetov, Gabit; Bazaliiskii, Vladimir I.; Beisenov, Arman; Boldbaatar, Bazartseren; Boldgiv, Bazartseren; Dorzhu, Choduraa; Ellingvag, Sturla; Erdenebaatar, Diimaajav; Dajani, Rana; Dmitriev, Evgeniy; Evdokimov, Valeriy; Frei, Karin M.; Gromov, Andrey; Goryachev, Alexander; Hakonarson, Hakon; Hegay, Tatyana; Khachatryan, Zaruhi; Khaskhanov, Ruslan; Kitov, Egor; Kolbina, Alina; Kubatbek, Tabaldiev; Kukushkin, Alexey; Kukushkin, Igor; Lau, Nina; Margaryan, Ashot; Merkyte, Inga; Mertz, Ilya V.; Mertz, Viktor K.; Mijiddorj, Enkhbayar; Moiyesev, Vyacheslav; Mukhtarova, Gulmira; Nurmukhanbetov, Bekmukhanbet; Orozbekova, Z.; Panyushkina, Irina; Pieta, Karol; Smrčka, Václav; Shevnina, Irina; Logvin, Andrey; Sjögren, Karl-Göran; Štolcová, Tereza; Taravella, Angela M.; Tashbaeva, Kadicha; Tkachev, Alexander; Tulegenov, Turaly; Voyakin, Dmitriy; Yepiskoposyan, Levon; Undrakhbold, Sainbileg; Varfolomeev, Victor; Weber, Andrzej; Wilson Sayres, Melissa A.; Kradin, Nikolay; Allentoft, Morten E.; Orlando, Ludovic; Nielsen, Rasmus; Sikora, Martin; Heyer, Evelyne; Kristiansen, Kristian; Willerslev, Eske (May 2018). "137 ancient human genomes from across the Eurasian steppes". Nature. 557 (7705): 369–374. Bibcode:2018Natur.557..369D. doi:10.1038/s41586-018-0094-2. hdl:1887/3202709. PMID 29743675.
- Demattè, Paola (2006). "Writing the Landscape: Petroglyphs of Inner Mongolia and Ningxia Province (China)". In David L. Peterson; et al. (eds.). Beyond the steppe and the sown: proceedings of the 2002 University of Chicago Conference on Eurasian Archaeology. Colloquia Pontica: series on the archaeology and ancient history of the Black Sea area. Vol. 13. Brill. pp. 300–313. (Proceedings of the First International Conference of Eurasian Archaeology, University of Chicago, 3–4 May 2002.)
- Di Cosmo, Nicola (1999). "The Northern Frontier in Pre-Imperial China". In Michael Loewe and Edward Shaughnessy (eds.). The Cambridge History of Ancient China. Cambridge University Press.
- Di Cosmo, Nicola (2002). Ancient China and its Enemies: The Rise of Nomadic Power in East Asian History. Cambridge University Press. (original edition)
- Di Cosmo, Nicola (2004). Ancient China and its Enemies: The Rise of Nomadic Power in East Asian History. Cambridge University Press. (First paperback edition)
- Fairbank, J.K.; Têng, S.Y. (1941). "On the Ch'ing Tributary System". Harvard Journal of Asiatic Studies. 6 (2): 135–246. doi:10.2307/2718006. JSTOR 2718006.
- Geng, Shimin [耿世民] (2005). 阿尔泰共同语、匈奴语探讨 [On Altaic Common Language and Xiongnu Language]. Yu Yan Yu Fan Yi 语言与翻译（汉文版） [Language and Translation] (2). OCLC 123501525. Archived from the original on 2012-02-25.
- Golden, Peter B. (1992). "Chapter VI – The Uyğur Qağante (742–840)". An Introduction to the History of the Turkic Peoples: Ethnogenesis and State-Formation in Medieval and Early Modern Eurasia and the Middle East. O. Harrassowitz. ISBN 978-3-447-03274-2.
- Grousset, Rene (1970). The Empire of the Steppes. Rutgers University Press. ISBN 978-0-8135-1304-1.
- Hall, Mark & Minyaev, Sergey. Chemical Analyses of Xiong-nu Pottery: A Preliminary Study of Exchange and Trade on the Inner Asian Steppes. In: Journal of Archaeological Science (2002) 29, pp. 135–144
- Harmatta, János (1 January 1994). "Conclusion". In Harmatta, János (ed.). History of Civilizations of Central Asia: The Development of Sedentary and Nomadic Civilizations, 700 B. C. to A. D. 250. UNESCO. pp. 485–492. ISBN 978-92-3-102846-5.
- Harmatta, János (1992). "The Emergence of the Indo-Iranians: The Indo-Iranian Languages". In Dani, A. H.; Masson, V. M. (eds.). History of Civilizations of Central Asia: The Dawn of Civilization: Earliest Times to 700 B. C. (PDF). UNESCO. pp. 346–370. ISBN 978-92-3-102719-2.
- Hucker, Charles O. (1975). China's Imperial Past: An Introduction to Chinese History and Culture. Stanford University Press. ISBN 0-8047-2353-2. "The proto-Turkic Hsiung-nu were now challenged by other alien groups—proto-Tibetans, proto-Mongol tribes called the Hsien-pi, and separate proto-Turks called To-pa (Toba)."
- Ishjamts, N. (1996). "Nomads In Eastern Central Asia". In Janos Harmatta; et al. (eds.). History of civilizations of Central Asia. Volume 2: The Development of Sedentary and Nomadic Civilizations, 700 bc to ad 250. UNESCO. pp. 151–170. ISBN 92-3-102846-4. OCLC 928730707.
- Jankowski, Henryk [in Polish] (2006). Historical-Etymological Dictionary of Pre-Russian Habitation Names of the Crimea. Handbuch der Orientalistik [HdO], 8: Central Asia; 15. Brill. ISBN 978-90-04-15433-9.
- Keyser-Tracqui, Christine; et al. (October 2006). "Population origins in Mongolia: genetic structure analysis of ancient and modern DNA". American Journal of Physical Anthropology. 131 (2). American Association of Physical Anthropologists: 272–281. Bibcode:2006AJPA..131..272K. doi:10.1002/ajpa.20429. PMID 16596591.
- Kim, Kijeong; et al. (July 2010). "A western Eurasian male is found in 2000-year-old elite Xiongnu cemetery in Northeast Mongolia". American Journal of Physical Anthropology. 142 (3). American Association of Physical Anthropologists: 429–440. Bibcode:2010AJPA..142..429K. doi:10.1002/ajpa.21242. PMID 20091844.
- Loewe, Michael (1974). "The campaigns of Han Wu-ti". In Kierman, Frank A. Jr.; Fairbank, John K. (eds.). Chinese ways in warfare. Harvard Univ. Press.
- Maenchen-Helfen, Otto (1973). The World of the Huns: Studies in Their History and Culture (1st ed.). Berkeley: University of California Press. ISBN 0-520-01596-7. LCCN 79094985. OCLC 801712.
- Pearce, Scott (2023). Northern Wei (386-534): A New Form of Empire in East Asia. Oxford University Press. ISBN 978-0-19-760039-9.
- Psarras, Sophia-Karin (2003). "Han and Xiongnu: A Reexamination of Cultural and Political Relations". Monumenta Serica. 51: 55–236. doi:10.1080/02549948.2003.11731391. JSTOR 40727370.
- Pulleyblank, Edwin G. (1994). "Ji Hu: Indigenous Inhabitants of Shaanbei and Western Shanxi". Opuscula Altaica: Essays Presented in Honor of Henry Schwarz. 19: 499–531.
- Pulleyblank, Edwin G. (2000). "Ji 姬 and Jiang 姜: The Role of Exogamic Clans in the Organization of the Zhou Polity". Early China. 25: 1–27. doi:10.1017/S0362502800004259.
- Schuessler, Axel (2014). "Phonological Notes on Hàn Period Transcriptions of Foreign Names and Words" (PDF). Studies in Chinese and Sino-Tibetan Linguistics: Dialect, Phonology, Transcription and Text. Language and Linguistics Monograph Series (53). Taipei, Taiwan: Institute of Linguistics, Academia Sinica. Archived from the original (PDF) on 2021-06-07.
- State Hermitage Museum (2007). "Prehistoric Art - Early Nomads of the Altaic Region". The Hermitage Museum. Archived from the original on 2007-06-22.
- Tang, Changru (December 2010). 《魏晋南北朝史论丛》 (in Chinese). Beijing: Commercial Press. ISBN 978-7-100-07451-3. Chapters:
  - 魏晋杂胡考 一 屠各
  - 魏晋杂胡考 四 乌丸
  - 魏晋杂胡考 二 卢水胡
- Whitehouse, Ruth, ed. (2016). Macmillan Dictionary of Archaeology. Macmillan Education. ISBN 978-1-349-07589-8.
- Wink, A. (2002). Al-Hind: making of the Indo-Islamic World. Brill. ISBN 0-391-04174-6.
- Yap, Joseph P. (2009). Wars with the Xiongnu: A translation from Zizhi tongjian. AuthorHouse. ISBN 978-1-4490-0604-4. AuthorHouse.
