= Han Wang =

Han Wang is an atonal romanization of various Chinese names and royal titles.

It usually refers to either a king or prince (王, wáng) of either the region of Han (漢 or 汉, Hàn) within China or Han (韓, Hán), both a former Chinese state and the Chinese name for South Korea.

== Kings/Princes of Hàn (漢王) ==
- Liu Bang, later Emperor Gaozu of Han, who ruled under Chu as King of Han 206–202 BC
- Yang Liang, Prince of Han under the Sui dynasty (581–605)
- Li Jiong, Prince of Han under the Tang dynasty (762–796)
- Wang Jianli, Prince of Han under the Later Jin dynasty (940)
- Zhao Dechang, later Emperor Zhenzong of Song, who was titled Prince of Han 983–988
- Wanyan Yongji, later an emperor of the Jurchen Jin, who was titled Prince of Han 1191–1197

== Kings/Princes of Hán (韩王) ==
- Rulers of independent Han during the Warring States era
  - Xuanhui King of Han (d. 312 BC)
  - Xiang King of Han (d. 296 BC)
  - Xi King of Han (d. 273 BC)
  - Huanhui King of Han (d. 239 BC)
  - An King of Han (d. 226 BC)
- Rulers of Han as a vassal of Chu after the fall of the Qin Empire
  - Han Cheng (r. 206 BC)
  - Zheng Chang (r. 206–205 BC)
  - Xin King of Han (r. 205–196 BC)
- King Jun of Gojoseon, who proclaimed himself King of Han after being forced into exile in 194 BC
- Chen Youliang, rebel against the Yuan who proclaimed himself King of Han (1359–1363)
- Zhu Benli, later the Dingwu Emperor of the Southern Ming, who was titled Prince of Han 1611–1646

== See also ==
- Wang Han (disambiguation), various Chinese names sometimes mistakenly reversed to Han Wang in English
- Hanwang (disambiguation), various Chinese placenames sometimes mistakenly separated as Han Wang in English
- Han (disambiguation)
- Category:Han dynasty imperial princes
