= Han–Xiongnu wars =

Conflicts between the Han Empire and the Xiongnu (133 BC – 89 AD)

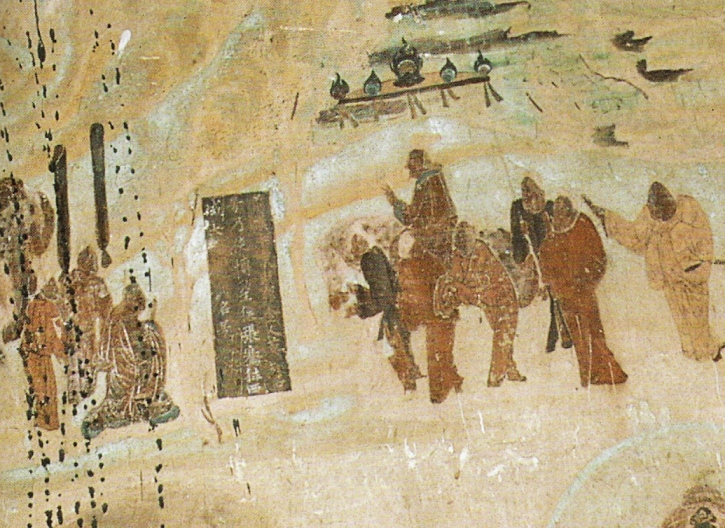
- Emperor Wu dispatching the diplomat Zhang Qian to Central Asia, Mogao Caves mural, 8th century
Date	133 BC – 89 AD; 90–91 AD (punitive campaign)
Location	Present-day North and Northwestern China, Mongolia, southern Siberia and Central Asia
Result	Han victory: Destruction of the Xiongnu hegemony in the Eurasian steppes; Establishment of Han suzerainty in the Western Regions; Annexation of the Ordos Plateau and Hexi Corridor by the Han; Fragmentation of the Xiongnu confederacy and later vassalization of the Southern Xiongnu

Belligerents
Xiongnu; Qiang; Wuhuan; Wusun	Han dynasty; Xin dynasty (9–23 AD); Tributary and allied forces: Southern Xiongnu; Qiang; Wuhuan; Xianbei; Wusun

Commanders and leaders
Junchen Chanyu; Yizhixie Chanyu; Hunye Chanyu (surrendered); Xiutu †; Zhizhi Chanyu †; ...and others	Emperor Wu of Han; Emperor Xuan of Han; Emperor Guangwu of Han; Emperor Ming of Han; Emperor Zhang of Han; Emperor He of Han; Wei Qing; Huo Qubing; Li Guang ‡‡; Li Ling (surrendered); Li Guangli (surrendered); Ban Chao; Dou Gu; Dou Xian; ...and others

The Han–Xiongnu wars or Sino–Xiongnu wars, were a series of military conflicts fought from 133 BC to 89 AD between the agrarian Chinese Han dynasty and the nomadic pastoralist Xiongnu confederacy, although extended conflicts can be traced back as early as 200 BC and as late as 188 AD.

The Chinese civilization initially clashed with the Inner Asian steppe nomad tribes (then collectively known as Di) that would later become the Xiongnu during the Warring States period, and various northern states built elongated fortifications (which later became the Great Wall of China) to defend against raids down from the Mongolian Plateau. The unified Qin dynasty, who conquered all other states under Qin Shi Huang, dispatched Meng Tian in 215 BC in a successful campaign to expel the Xiongnu from the Ordos region (which was often used as a staging area to threaten Qin's Guanzhong heartland). However, the subsequent civil war following the Qin dynasty's collapse gave the Xiongnu confederacy, which were then unified into a large nomadic empire under Modu Chanyu, the opportunity to reinvade the Ordos region. After the Han dynasty was established in 202 BC, Emperor Gaozu tried to fight off Xiongnu invasions but had himself trapped in an ambush during the Battle of Baideng, and a truce was negotiated by bribing Modu's wife, thus ending the first Han–Xiongnu conflict. Decades of de jure peace then followed with the Chinese implementing marriage alliances to appease the Xiongnu, who still routinely raided Chinese borderlands.

However, starting from the reign of the seventh Han sovereign, Emperor Wu, the foreign policy of the Han dynasty began to change from being relatively passive to using a proactive strategy seeking to permanently remove the northern threat. The tension fully escalated in 133 BC when the Han army unsuccessfully tried to ambush Xiongnu raiders at Mayi, and retaliatory border raids intensified. Emperor Wu then started deploying younger generations of offensive military commanders such as Wei Qing and Huo Qubing, and launched several victorious expeditions to control the Ordos Plateau, Hexi Corridor and Western Regions, eventually pushing the Xiongnu north beyond the Gobi Desert with a decisive campaign in 119 BC. After the death of Emperor Wu in 87 BC, the conflict de-escalated to mostly small border conflicts, although Emperor Xuan and Emperor Yuan each sanctioned major offensives against the Xiongnu during their reigns. The overall strategic Han successes against the Xiongnu allowed the Chinese to project their influence deep into Central Asia, which eventually led to the establishment of a regional protectorate in 60 BC. For the Xiongnu, the situation deteriorated with each setback, leading to erosion of the chanyu's prestige among the steppe tribes, and the subsequent internal power struggles further weakened the nomadic confederacy, fracturing it into various self-ruling factions. The Han dynasty then adhered to a divide and conquer strategy, continuing to use marriage alliances (such as that of Wang Zhaojun to Huhanye) to recruit some against others.

During the interregnum Xin dynasty, Wuzhuliu Chanyu waged war in 11 AD after Wang Mang, a consort kin who usurped the Western Han throne, attempted to split the Xiongnu by installing 15 new chanyu. Wang Mang mobilized 300,000 troops against Xiongnu and forced Goguryeo, Wuhuan and various Western Regions city-states to send conscripts and provisions, which led to the mass defection of these vassal states. After the Eastern Han dynasty was established in 25 AD, the Chinese initially found their hands full after the chaotic civil war and could not afford any full-scale mobilizations against the Xiongnu raids; they therefore resorted to continue lobbying amongst Xiongnu faction rulers instead. This went on for another two decades until 46 AD, when repeated natural disasters severely weakened the Xiongnu and forced them to flee north from an attack by Wuhuan. The Xiongnu then permanently split into two groups in 48 AD, becoming the Northern and Southern Xiongnu. The Southern Xiongnu submitted as vassals to the Han dynasty, and served as auxiliaries in Han wars against the Northern Xiongnu and other hostile Donghu states like the Xianbei. The Northern Xiongnu continued to resist the Han and were eventually evicted westwards by further Han expeditions. In 89 AD, Dou Xian led 50,000 cavalry on an expedition that decisively defeated the Northern Xiongnu's main force, causing it to split further. In 91 AD, Northern Chanyu was defeated in the Battle of the Altai Mountains, and they fled west into Dzungaria, where they continued causing sporadic troubles until 151 AD when a 4,000-strong Han militia was enough to defeat them, causing them to flee further west into Central Asia where they disappeared from historical records. The Southern Xiongnu continued to be vassals of the Eastern Han, though they occasionally launched revolts until as late as the Yellow Turban Rebellion era. Nonetheless, by 89 AD onwards, the Han dynasty's main concern had already switched to the Qiang people, who had become a bigger threat than the Xiongnu.

== Background ==
During the Warring States period, the Qin, Zhao, and Yan states conquered various nomadic territories inhabited by the Xiongnu and other Hu peoples. They strengthened their new frontiers with elongated wall fortifications. By 221 BC, the Qin ended the chaotic Eastern Zhou period by conquering all other states and unifying China proper. In 215 BC, Qin Shi Huang ordered Meng Tian to set out against the Xiongnu tribes situated in the Ordos region and establish a frontier at the Ordos Loop. Believing the Xiongnu were a possible threat, the emperor launched this pre-emptive strike, also with the intention of expanding his empire. Later that year, Meng Tian succeeded in defeating the Xiongnu and seizing their territory. After the catastrophic defeat at the hands of Meng, Touman Chanyu and his followers fled far into the Mongolian Plateau. Fusu and Meng Tian were stationed at a garrison in Suide and soon began the construction of walled defences, connecting them with the old walls built by the Qin, Yan and Zhao states. The fortified walls ran from Liaodong to Lintao, thus enclosing the conquered Ordos region and safeguarding the Qin dynasty against the Xiongnu and other northern nomadic people. Due to the northward expansion, the threat that the Qin posed to the Xiongnu ultimately led the many tribes towards the formation of a confederacy.

However, after Qin Shi Huang's sudden death, the ensuing political corruption and chaos during the short reign of Qin Er Shi led to various anti-Qin rebellions, eventually bringing about the collapse of the Qin dynasty. A massive civil war then erupted between various reinstated states, with Liu Bang ultimately being victorious and establishing the Han dynasty. During the transitional years between Qin and Han, while the Chinese were mainly focused towards the interior of their nation, the Xiongnu took the opportunity to retake the territory north of the wall. The Xiongnu frequently led incursions to the Han frontier and had considerable political influence over the border regions. In response, Emperor Gaozu led an army against the Xiongnu in 200 BC, pursuing them as far as Pingcheng (present-day Datong, Shanxi) before being ambushed by Modu Chanyu's cavalry. His encampment was encircled by the Xiongnu, but he escaped after seven days. After realizing that a military solution was not feasible for the time being, Emperor Gaozu sent Liu Jing to negotiate peace with Modu Chanyu. In 198 BC, a marriage alliance was concluded between the Han and the Xiongnu, but this proved far from effective as the incursions in the border regions continued.

== Course ==
=== Onset ===
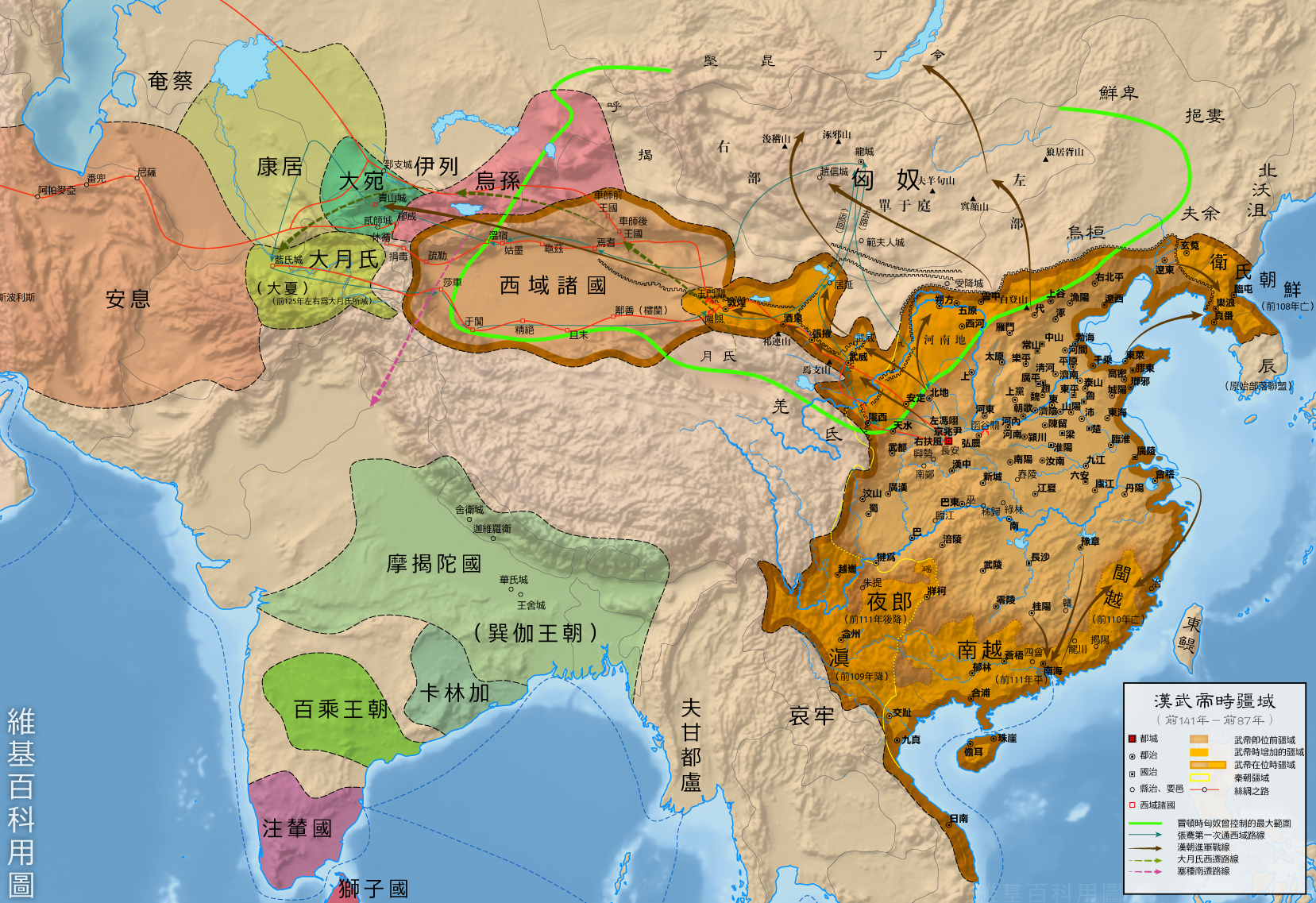
The expansion of the Han empire under Emperor Wu's reign (r. 141–87 BC)

By the reign of Emperor Wu, the Han empire was prospering and the national treasury had accumulated large surpluses. However, burdened by the frequent Xiongnu raids on the frontier, the emperor abandoned the policies of his predecessors of maintaining peace with the Xiongnu early in his reign. In 136 BC, after continued Xiongnu incursions near the northern frontier, Emperor Wu had a court conference assembled. The faction supporting war against the Xiongnu was able to sway the majority opinion by making a compromise for those worried about stretching financial resources on an indefinite campaign: in an engagement along the border near Mayi, Han forces would lure Junchen Chanyu over with wealth and promises of defections to eliminate him and cause political chaos for the Xiongnu. Emperor Wu launched his military campaigns against the Xiongnu in 133 BC.

In 133 BC, the Xiongnu forces led by the Chanyu (Note: In the Xiongnu hierarchy, the Chanyu was the supreme leader (Lewis 2007, 131).) were lured into a trap at Mayi, while a Han army of about 300,000 troops laid in ambush against the Xiongnu. Wang Hui led this campaign and commanded a force of 30,000 men strong, advancing from Dai with the intention of attacking the Xiongnu supply route. Han Anguo and Gongsun He commanded the remaining forces and advanced towards Mayi. Junchen Chanyu led his army of 100,000 men towards Mayi, but he became increasingly suspicious of the situation. When the ambush failed, because Junchen Chanyu realized he was about to fall into a trap and fled back north, the peace was broken and the Han court resolved to engage in full-scale war. In light of this battle, the Xiongnu became aware of the Han court's intentions to go to war. By that point the Han empire was long consolidated politically, militarily, and economically, and was led by an increasingly pro-war faction in the imperial court.

=== Skirmishes at the northern frontier ===
In late 129 BC, a Han force of 40,000 cavalrymen launched a surprise attack against the Xiongnu in the frontier markets, where masses of Xiongnu people visited to trade. In 128 BC, General Wei Qing led 30,000 men to battle in the regions north of Yanmen and came out victorious. The next year, the Xiongnu invaded Liaoxi, killing its governor, and advanced towards Yanmen. Han Anguo mobilized 700 men, but was defeated and withdrew to Yuyang. Thereafter, Wei Qing moved out with a force and captured some Xiongnu troops, causing the main force of the Xiongnu to withdraw. Meanwhile, Li Xi led a force across the frontier and also captured some of the Xiongnu troops.

=== Early campaigns by the Han empire ===
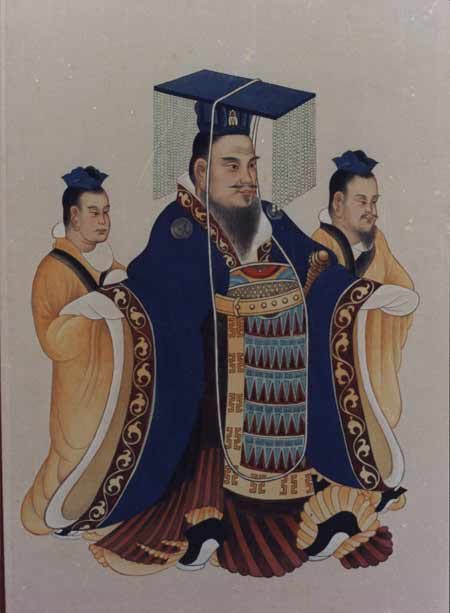
Emperor Wu of Han

Between 127 and 119 BC, Emperor Wu ordered the generals Wei Qing and Huo Qubing to lead several large-scale military campaigns against the Xiongnu. Leading campaigns involving tens of thousands of troops, General Wei Qing captured the Ordos Desert region from the Xiongnu in 127 BC and General Huo Qubing expelled them from the Qilian Mountains in 121 BC, with many Xiongnu aristocrats surrendering. The Han court also sent expeditions, ranging to over 100,000 troops, into Mongolia in 124 BC, 123 BC, and 119 BC, attacking the heart of Xiongnu territory. Following the successes of these campaigns, Emperor Wu wrote edicts in which he heavily praised the two generals for their achievements.

==== Ordos Loop ====
In 127 BC, General Wei Qing invaded and retook full control of the Ordos region. Earlier that year, he had departed from Yunzhong towards Longxi to invade the Xiongnu in Ordos. After the conquest, about 100,000 people resettled in the Ordos. Two commanderies were established in the region; Wuyuan and Shuofang. With the old Qin walled fortifications under their control, the Han set out to repair and extend the walls. In 126 BC, the Xiongnu sent out three forces of 30,000 troops each to raid Dai, Dinxiang, and Shang. That year, General Wei Qing advanced from Gaoque into Mongolia with 30,000 men and defeated the Xiongnu forces of the Tuqi King (Note: Second to the Chanyu in power were the Tuqi Kings; the Tuqi Kings are also called the "Wise Kings", where the Xiongnu word for "Tuqi" means "Wise" (Lewis 2007, 131).) and captured 15,000 men along with 10 tribal chiefs. In late 126 BC, the Xiongnu raided Dai once again; they took some prisoners and killed a Han military commander.

==== Southern Gobi Desert ====
In early 123 BC, General Wei Qing set off to Mongolia with an army to attack the Xiongnu; they marched back victorious to Dingxiang. Two months later, the Han army advanced towards the Xiongnu again, but this time the Xiongnu were prepared for the invasion. However, hereafter, due to the military expeditions of the Han empire, the Xiongnu moved their capital and retreated to the far northern regions of the Gobi Desert.

==== Hexi Corridor ====
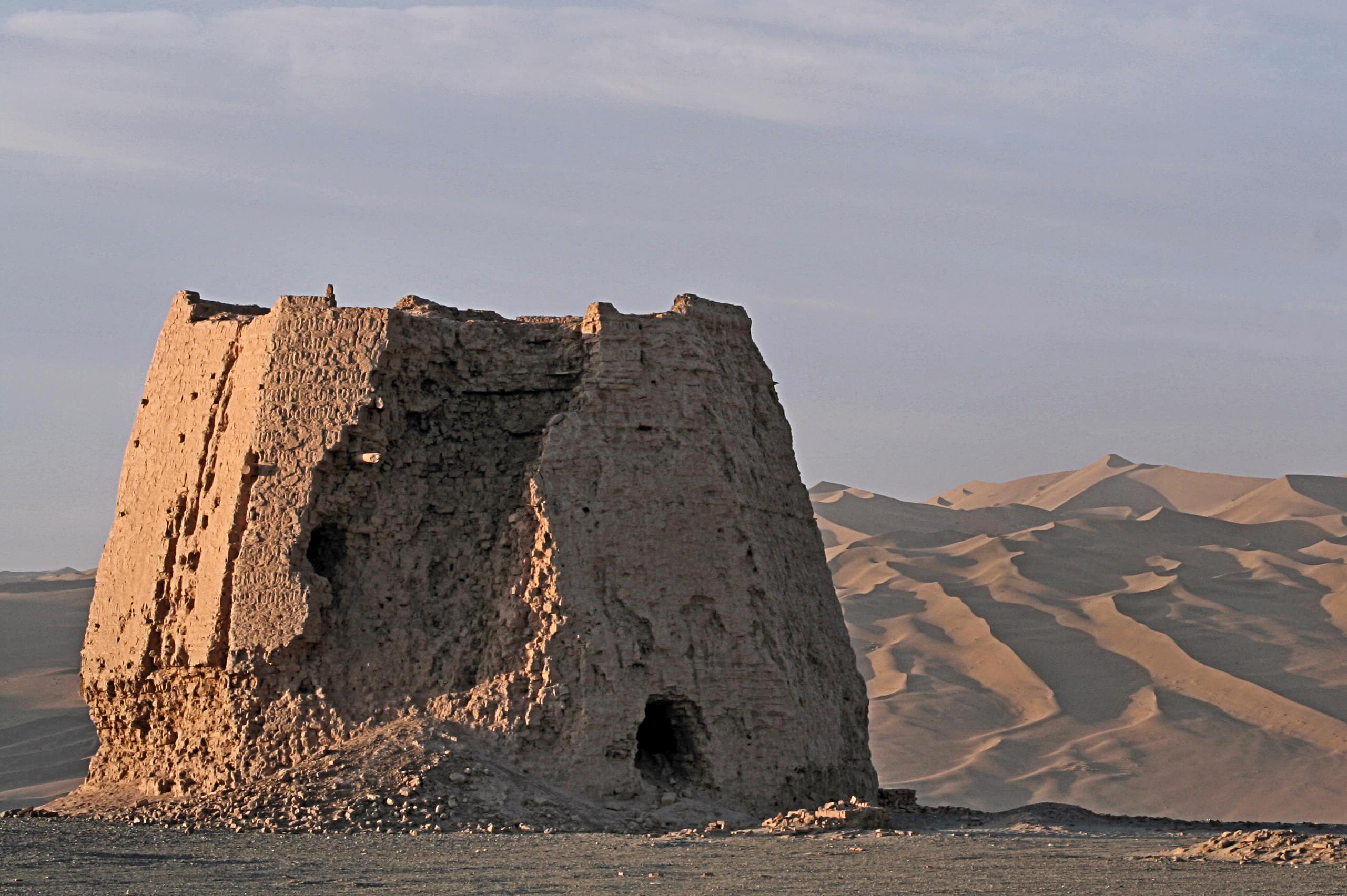
The ruins of a Han-era rammed earth watchtower in Dunhuang

In the Battle of Hexi (121 BC), the Han forces inflicted a major defeat to the Xiongnu. Emperor Wu desired to place firm control over the Hexi Corridor and launched a large military offensive to purge the Xiongnu from the area. The campaign was undertaken in 121 BC by the young general Huo Qubing, who was a nephew-in-law of Emperor Wu. Departing from Longxi that year, General Huo Qubing led cavalry corps and fought through five Xiongnu kingdoms, seizing the Yanzhi and Qilian Mountains from the Xiongnu.

In early 121 BC, Huo set out from Longxi and advanced into the territory of the Xiutu King, beyond the Yanzhi Mountains. About 18,000 Xiongnu cavalry were captured or killed.

In mid 121 BC, Huo advanced into the Anshan Desert to invade the Qilian Mountains. At the Qilian Mountains, the Hunye King saw the deaths of over 30,000 troops in battle against the Han, while 2,800 of his troops were captured.

Distraught by the huge losses and fearing the wrath of the Xiongnu Chanyu, the Xiutu King and the Hunye King planned to surrender to the Han dynasty. However, the Xiutu King suddenly changed his mind and wanted to flee back to the Chanyu's side, and the Hunye King killed him and assumed command of the Xiutu forces. When the Xiongnu forces went to meet Huo Qubing for the surrender, the Xiutu forces rioted in mutiny. Uncertain of the situation on the opposing side, Huo personally rode into Hunye King's camp and ordered him to maintain discipline among his own tribesmen, before quelling and killing 8,000 Xiutu troops who refused to stand down. In the end, the Hunye King and his 40,000 tribal soldiers surrendered peacefully, which led to the Hexi Corridor being permanently annexed by the Han empire.

Now having conquered a strategic territory stretching from Longxi to Lop Nur, the Han empire effectively cut off the Xiongnu from their Qiang allies in the Tibetan Plateau. In 111 BC, a major Qiang–Xiongnu allied force was repelled from the Hexi Corridor. Hereafter, four new commanderies were established in the Hexi Corridor, namely Wuwei, Zhangye, Jiuquan and Dunhuang, which were populated with Han soldier settlers.

==== Northern Gobi Desert ====
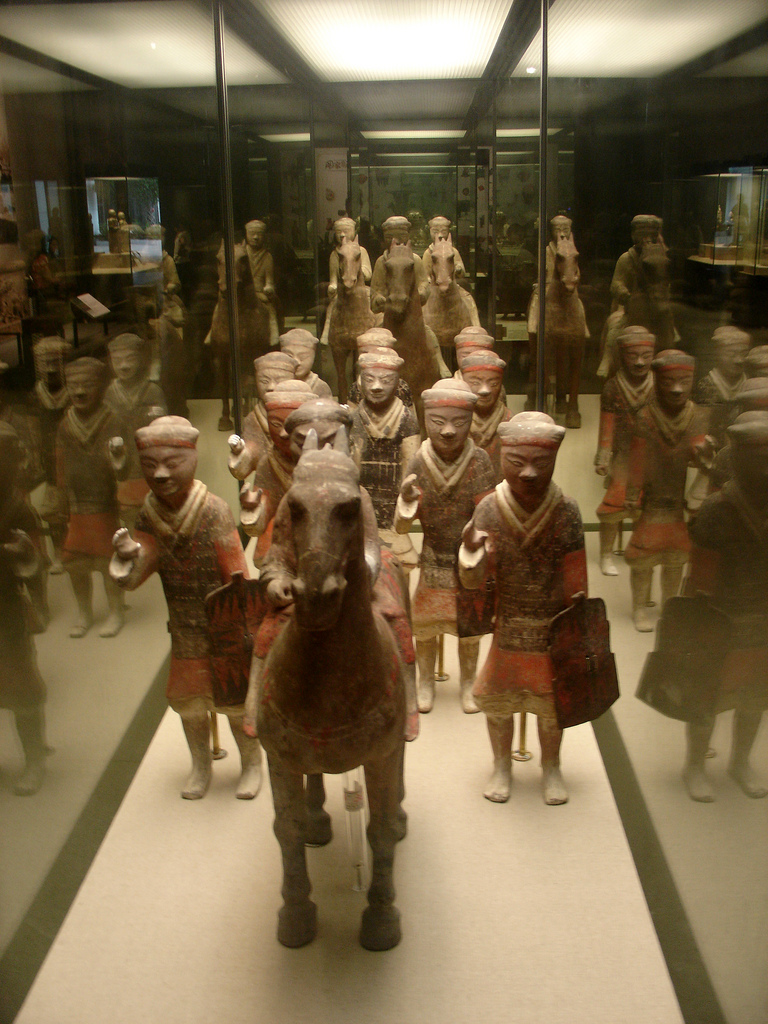
Painted ceramic statues of Chinese cavalrymen and infantrymen, from the Western Han period (202 BC – 9 AD)

The Battle of Mobei (119 BC) saw Han forces invade the northern Gobi Desert, as well as areas north of the Gobi. In 119 BC, two separate expeditionary forces led by the Han generals Wei Qing and Huo Qubing mobilized towards the Xiongnu. The two generals led the campaign to the Khangai Mountains and the Orkhon Valley, where they forced the Chanyu to flee north of the Gobi Desert. The two forces together comprised 100,000 cavalrymen, 140,000 horses, and a few hundred thousand infantry. They advanced into the desert in pursuit of the main force of the Xiongnu. The campaign was a major victory for the Han against Xiongnu, as the Xiongnu were driven from the Gobi Desert. The Xiongnu casualties ranged from 80 to 90 thousand troops, while the Han casualties ranged from 20 to 30 thousand troops. The Han forces had also lost around 100,000 horses during the campaign.

During this campaign, Huo Qubing's elite troops had set off from Dai to link up with Lu Bode's forces in Yucheng, after which they advanced further and engaged the Tuqi King of the Left (Note: The Tuqi King of the Left was generally designated as the successor of the Chanyu (Lewis 2007, 131).) and his army. Huo Qubing's army encircled and overran their enemy, killing around 70,000 Xiongnu, including the Tuqi King of the Left. He then went on to conduct a series of rituals upon arrival at the Khentii Mountains to symbolize the historic Han victory, then continued his pursuit as far as Lake Baikal.

Wei Qing's army, setting off from Dingxiang, encountered Yizhixie Chanyu's army. Wei Qing ordered his troops to arrange heavy-armoured chariots in a ring formation, creating mobile fortresses that provided archers, crossbowmen, and infantry protection from the Xiongnu's cavalry charges, and allowing the Han troops to utilize their ranged weapons' advantages. A 5,000-strong cavalry was deployed to reinforce the array against any Xiongnu attack. The Xiongnu charged the Han forces with a 10,000-strong vanguard cavalry. The battle solidified into a stalemate until dusk, when a sandstorm obscured the battlefield. Subsequently, Wei Qing sent in his main forces and overwhelmed the Xiongnu. The Han cavalry used the low visibility as cover and encircled the Xiongnu army from both flanks, but Yizhixie Chanyu and a contingent of troops broke through and escaped.

=== Control over the Western Regions ===
With the Han conquest of the Hexi Corridor in 121 BC, the city-states in the Tarim Basin were caught in between the onslaught of the war, with much shifting of allegiance. There were several Han military expeditions undertaken to secure the submission of the local kings to the Han empire; the Han took control of the regions for strategic purposes while the Xiongnu needed the regions as a source of revenue. Due to the ensuing war with the Han empire, the Xiongnu were forced to extract more crafts and agricultural foodstuffs from the Tarim Basin urban centres. By 115 BC, the Han had set up commanderies at Jiuquan and Wuwei, while extending the old Qin fortifications from Lingju to the area west of Dunhuang. From 115 to 60 BC, the Han and Xiongnu competed for control and influence over these states, which saw the rise of power of the Han empire over eastern Central Asia with the decline of that of the Xiongnu's. The Han empire brought the states of Loulan, Jushi (Turfan), Luntai (Bügür), Dayuan (Ferghana), and Kangju (Soghdiana) into tributary submission between 108 and 101 BC. The long-walled defence line that now stretched all the way to Dunhuang protected the people, guided caravans and troops to and from Central Asia, and served to separate the Xiongnu from their allies, the Qiang people.

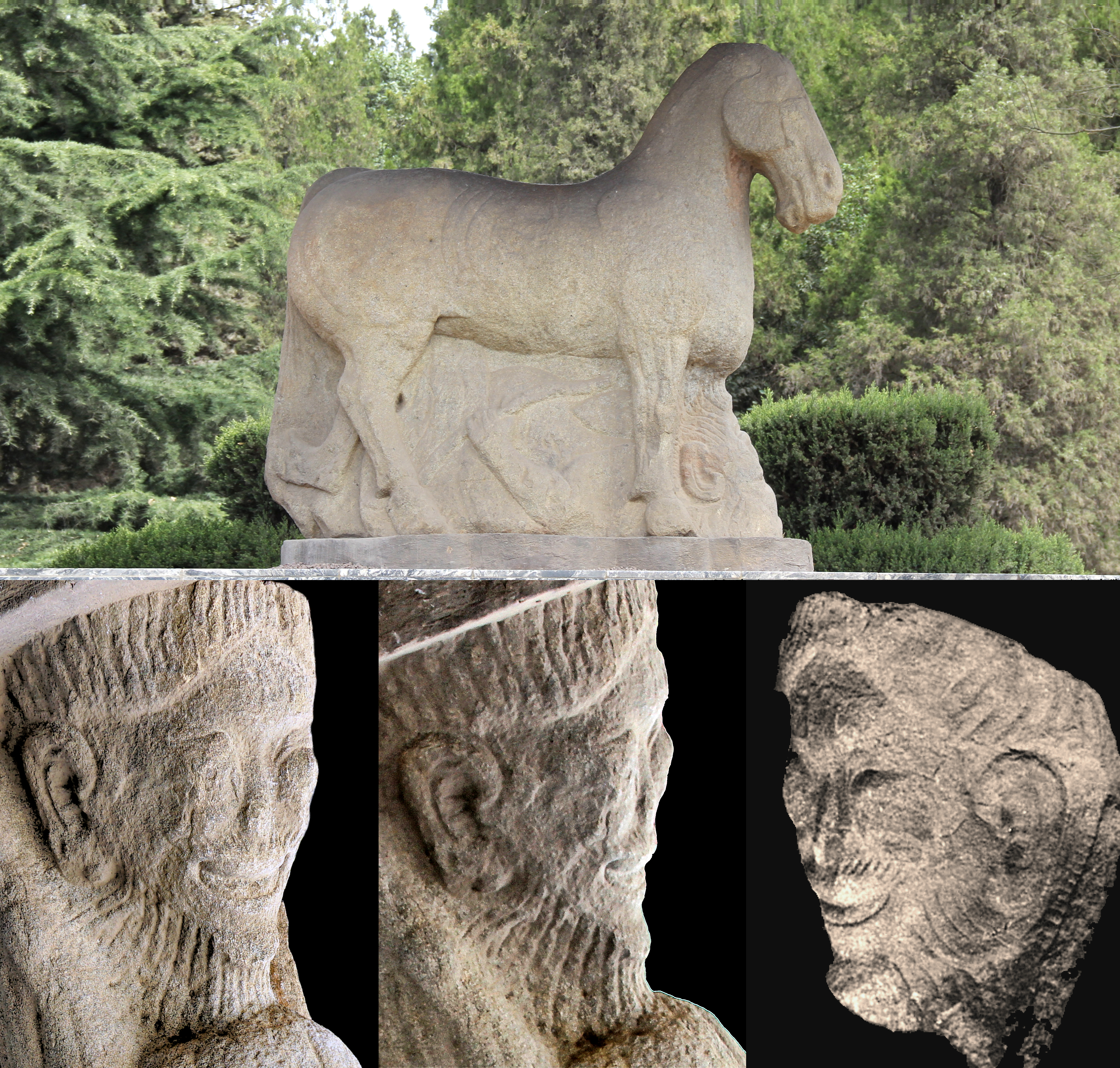
Tomb of Chinese general Huo Qubing (died 117 BC): statue of a horse stomping a Xiongnu warrior, with detail of the head of the vanquished Xiongnu warrior.

In 115 BC Zhang Qian was once again dispatched to the Western Regions to secure military alliances against the Xiongnu. He sought out the various states in Central Asia, such as the Wusun. He came back without achieving his goals, but he gained valuable knowledge about the Western Regions like in his previous travels. Emperor Wu received reports from Zhang about the large and powerful horses of Ferghana. These horses were known as "heavenly horses" or "blood-sweating horses". Zhang brought back some of these horses to the Han empire. The emperor thought that the horses were of high importance to fight the Xiongnu. The refusal of the Dayuan kingdom—a nation centred in Ferghana—to provide the Han empire with the horses and the execution of a Han envoy led to conflict; the Han forces brought Dayuan into submission in 101 BC. The Xiongnu, aware of this predicament, had tried to halt the Han advance, but were outnumbered and suffered defeat.

General Zhao Ponu was sent on an expedition in 108 BC to invade Jushi, a critical economic and military stronghold of the Xiongnu in the Western Regions. After he conquered the region, the Han forces repelled all Xiongnu attacks to regain control over Jushi. When King Angui acceded the throne of Loulan, the kingdom—which was the easternmost state of the Western Regions—became increasingly apprehensive towards the Han. Their policies became somewhat anti-Han in nature and supportive towards the Xiongnu, such as allowing the killing of passing Han envoys to happen and revealing Han military logistics. In 77 BC, King Angui received the Han emissary Fu Jiezi and held a banquet for the envoy, who came under the guise of bringing many coveted gifts. During the banquet, Fu Jiezi requested a private discussion with King Angui, which was a pretence for the assassination of the Loulan ruler by two of Fu Jiezi's officers. Amid the cries of horror, Fu Jiezi proclaimed an admonition (Note: The translation given by Hulsewé (1979, 90) is as follows: "The Son of Heaven has sent me to punish the king, by reason of his crime in turning against Han. It is fitting that in his place you should enthrone his younger brother Wei-t'u-ch'i who is at present in Han. Han troops are about to arrive here; do not dare to make any move which would result in yourselves bringing about the destruction of your state.") to the Loulan aristocracy and beheaded the dead king. The Han court informed Angui's brother Weituqi—who was an ally of the Han—of his death, had him escorted back from Chang'an to Loulan, and installed him as the new monarch of the kingdom, which was renamed Shanshan. Thereafter, the royal seat was relocated to the southern parts of Shanshan (present-day Kargilik or Ruoqiang), outside the sphere of Xiongnu influence.

The Xiongnu practised marriage alliances with Han dynasty officers and officials who defected to their side. The older sister of the Chanyu was married to the Xiongnu General Zhao Xin, the Marquis of Xi who was serving the Han dynasty. The daughter of the Chanyu was married to the Han Chinese General Li Ling after he surrendered and defected. The Yenisei Kirghiz Khagans claimed descent from Li Ling. Another Han Chinese General who defected to the Xiongnu was Li Guangli who also married to a daughter of the Chanyu.

=== Decline of the Xiongnu ===
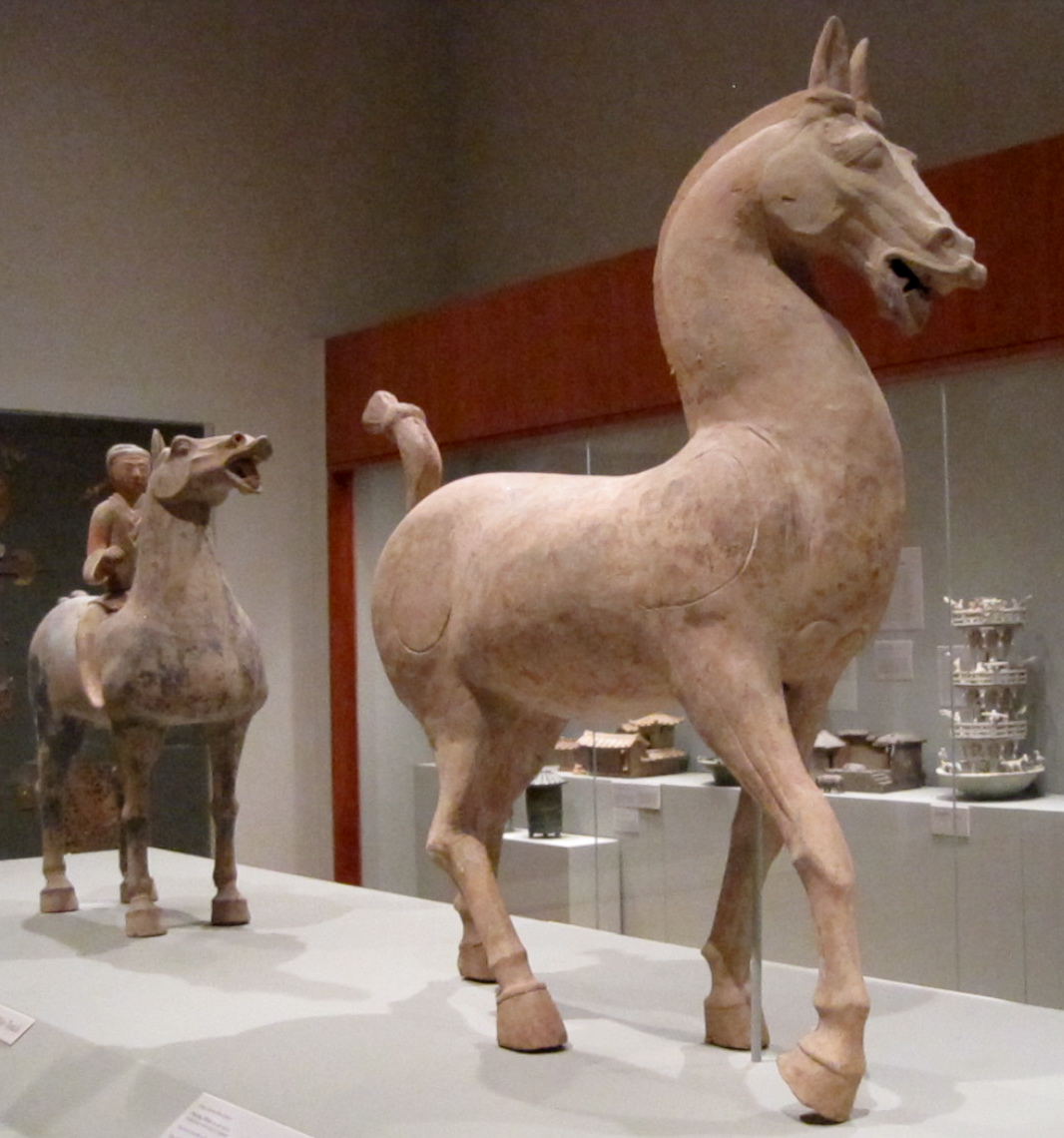
Ceramic statues of a prancing horse (foreground) and a cavalryman on horseback (background), Eastern Han period (25–220 AD)

Due to the many losses inflicted on the Xiongnu, rebellion broke out and their slaves rose up in arms. Around 80 BC, the Xiongnu attacked the Wusun in a punitive campaign and the Wusun monarch requested military support from the Han empire. In 72 BC, the joint forces of the Wusun and Han invaded the territory of the Luli King (Note: Second to the Chanyu in power were the Tuqi Kings, followed by the Luli Kings (Lewis 2007, 131).) of the Right. Around 40,000 Xiongnu people and many of their livestock were captured before their city was sacked. The next year, various tribes invaded and raided Xiongnu territory on all fronts; Wusun from the west, Dingling from the north, and Wuhuan from the east. The Han forces set out in five columns and invaded from the south. According to Hanshu, this event marks the beginning of Xiongnu decline and the dismantlement of the confederation.

=== Internal discord between the Xiongnu ===
As the Xiongnu economic and military situation deteriorated, the Xiongnu were willing to renew peace during the reigns of Huyandi Chanyu (85–69 BC) and Xulüquanqu Chanyu (68–60 BC), but the Han court gave only one option, tributary submission. After Xulüquanqu Chanyu's death in 60 BC, a Xiongnu civil war broke out in 57 BC over the succession, which fully fragmented the Xiongnu confederation with many contenders. In the end, only Zhizhi Chanyu and Huhanye Chanyu survived the struggle for power. After Zhizhi Chanyu (r. 56–36 BC) had inflicted serious losses against his rival Huhanye Chanyu (r. 58–31 BC), Huhanye and his supporters debated whether to request military protection and become a Han vassal. In 53 BC, Huhanye decided to do so and surrendered to Han empire rule.

General Chen Tang and Protector General Gan Yanshou, acting without explicit permission from the Han court, killed Zhizhi Chanyu at his capital city (present-day Taraz, Kazakhstan) in 36 BC. Taking the initiative, Chen Tang had forged an imperial decree, which led to the mobilization of 40,000 troops in two columns. The Han forces besieged and defeated the forces of Zhizhi Chanyu, and afterwards beheaded him. His head was sent to the Han capital Chang'an. On return to Chang'an, the two officers faced legal enquiries for forging a decree, but were pardoned. Chen and Gan received modest rewards, although the Han court was reluctant to do so due to the precedent that this event set.

=== Collapse of Xiongnu ===
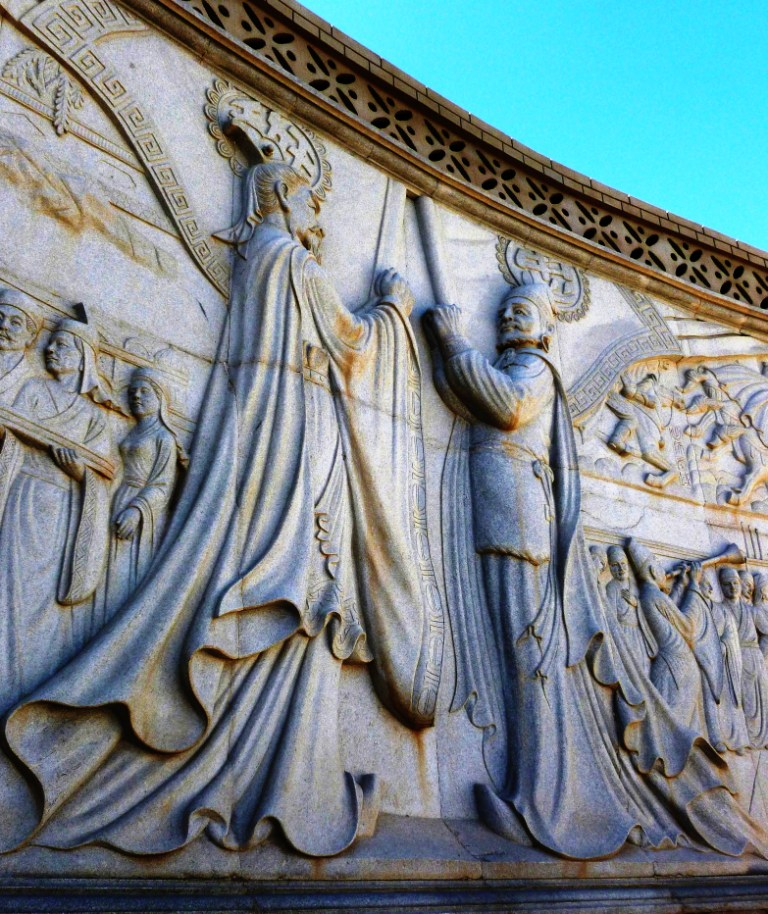
In 74 AD, General Ban Chao (left) captured King Douti of Kashgar and replaced him with King Yule (right), who was granted the name Zhong.

In 9 AD, the Han official Wang Mang usurped the Han throne and proclaimed a new Chinese dynasty, known as the Xin. He regarded the Xiongnu as lowly vassals and relations rapidly deteriorated. During the winter of 10 and 11 AD, Wang amassed 300,000 troops along the northern frontier, which forced the Xiongnu to defer launching large-scale attacks. Although Han rule was restored in August 25 AD by Emperor Guangwu, its grip over the Tarim Basin had weakened. The Xiongnu had taken advantage of the situation and gained control over the Western Regions.

The first half of the 1st century BC saw several succession crises for the Xiongnu leadership, allowing the Han empire to reaffirm its control over the Western Regions. Huduershi Chanyu was succeeded by his son Punu in 46 AD, thus breaking Huhanye's orders that only a Xiongnu ruler's brother was a valid successor. Bi, the Rizhu King of the Right and Huduershi's nephew, was outraged and was declared a rival chanyu by eight southern Xiongnu tribes in 48 AD. The Xiongnu confederation fell apart in the Northern Xiongnu and Southern Xiongnu, and Bi submitted to the reign of the Han empire in 50 AD. The Han took control of the Southern Xiongnu under Bi, which had 30–40 thousand troops and a population of roughly twice or thrice the size.

Between 73 and 102 AD, General Ban Chao led several expeditions in the Tarim Basin, re-establishing Han control over the region. At the capital of Shanshan by Lop Nur, Ban Chao and a small party of his men killed a visiting Northern Xiongnu embassy to Shanshan. Ban Chao presented their heads to King Guang of Shanshan, who was overwhelmed by the ordeal, whereupon he sent hostages to Han. When Ban Chao traveled further to Yutian (Khotan), King Guangde received him with little courtesy. The King's soothsayer told the King that he should demand Ban Chao's horse, so Ban Chao killed the soothsayer for the insult. Impressed by the ruthlessness that he witnessed, the King killed a Xiongnu agent and offered submission to the Han. Going further westward, Ban Chao and his party arrived at Shule. Earlier, King Jian of Kucha had deposed the former king and replaced him with his officer Douti. In 74 AD, Ban Chao's forces captured King Douti of Kashgar (Shule), both a puppet of Kucha and an ally of the Xiongnu. Local opponents to the new regime had offered support to the Han. Tian Lü (Ban Chao's officer) took Douti captive and Ban Chao put Zhong (a prince of the native dynasty) on the throne. Ban Chao, insisting on leniency, send Douti back to Kucha unharmed.

In 73 AD, General Dou Gu and his army departed from Jiuquan and advanced towards the Northern Xiongnu, defeating the Northern Xiongnu and pursuing them as far as Lake Barkol before establishing a garrison at Hami. In 74 AD, Dou Gu retook Turfan from the Xiongnu. The Han campaigns resulted in the retreat of the Northern Xiongnu to Dzungaria, while Ban Chao was threatening and bringing the city-states in the Tarim Basin to submission under the Han empire once again. In 74 AD, the King of Jushi submitted to the Han forces under General Dou Gu as the Xiongnu were unable to engage the Han forces.

Later that year, the kingdoms of Karasahr (Yanqi) and Kucha were forced to surrender to the Han empire. Although Dou Gu was able to evict the Xiongnu from Turfan in 74 AD, the Northern Xiongnu soon invaded the Bogda Mountains while their allies from Karasahr and Kucha killed the Protector General Chen Mu and his men. As a result, the Han garrison at Hami was forced to withdraw in 77 AD, which was not reestablished until 91 AD.

=== Final stages ===
In 89 AD, General Dou Xian led a Han expedition against the Northern Xiongnu. The army advanced from Jilu, Manyi, and Guyang in three great columns. In mid 89 AD, the forces, comprising a total of 40,000 troops, assembled at Zhuoye Mountain. Near the end of the campaign, Dou's forces chased the Northern Chanyu into the Altai Mountains, killing 13,000 Xiongnu and accepting the surrender of 200,000 Xiongnu from 81 tribes. A light cavalry of 2,000 was sent towards the Xiongnu at Hami, capturing the region from them. General Dou Xian marched with his troops in a triumphal progress to the heartland of the Northern Xiongnu's territory and engraved an inscription commemorating the victory on Mount Yanran, before returning to the Han. The Han victory in the campaign of 89 AD resulted in the destruction of the Xiongnu state. In 2017, a joint Sino-Mongolian archaeological expedition rediscovered the Inscription of Yanran in the Khangai Mountains of central Mongolia.

== Aftermath ==
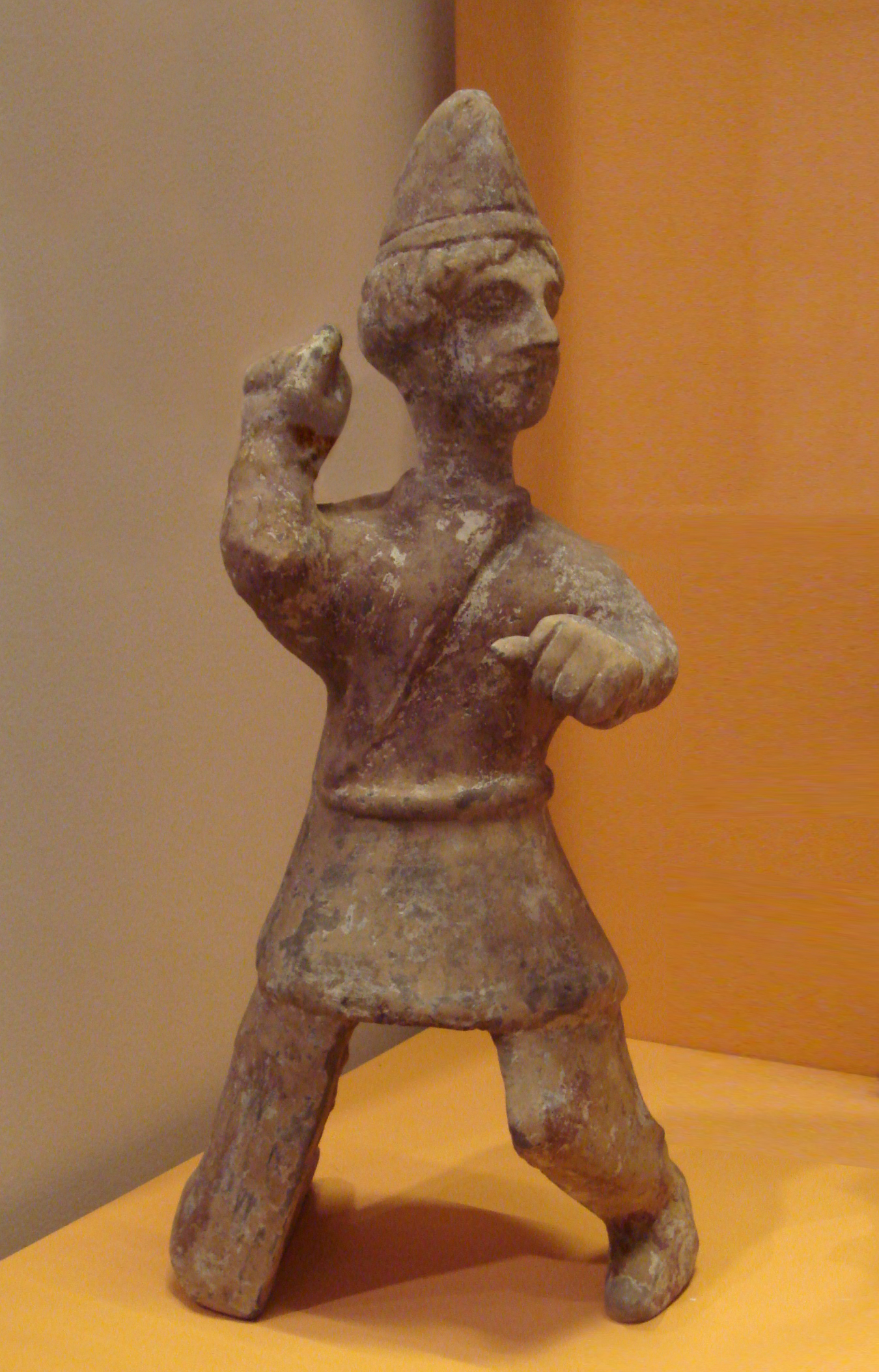
Mingqi (Chinese funerary statuette) of a young Central Asian man, with Scythian-type caftan and conical hat reminiscent of early 3rd century AD Kushans. Later Han, 3rd century AD. Guimet Museum (MA 4660).

In 90 AD, General Dou Xian had encamped at Wuwei. He sent Deputy Colonel Yan Pan with 2,000 light cavalry to strike down the final Xiongnu defenses in the Western Regions, capturing Yiwu and receiving the surrender of Jushi. Major Liang Feng was dispatched to capture the Northern Chanyu, which he did, but he was forced to leave him behind as Dou Xian had already broken camp and returned to China. In October of 90 AD, Dou Xian sent Liang Feng and Ban Gu to help the Northern Chanyu make preparations for his planned travel as he wished to submit to the Han court in person the following month.

However, this never came to pass as Dou Xian dispatched General Geng Kui and Shizi of the Southern Xiongnu with 8,000 light cavalry to attack the Northern Chanyu, encamped at Heyun, in 90 AD. Once the Han forces arrived at the Zhuoye Mountains, they left their heavy equipment behind to launch a swift pincer movement towards Heyun. Geng Kui attacked from the east via the Khangai Mountains and Ganwei River, while Shizi attacked from the west via the Western Lake. The Northern Chanyu—said to be greatly shocked by this—launched a counterattack, but he was forced to flee and left his family and seal behind. The Han killed 8,000 men and captured several thousands. In 91 AD, General Geng Kui and Major Ren Shang with a light cavalry of 800 advanced further via the Juyan Gol (Juyansai) into the Altai Mountains, where the Northern Chanyu had encamped. At the Battle of Altai Mountains, they massacred 5,000 Xiongnu men and pursued the Northern Chanyu until he escaped. By 91 AD, the last remnants of the Northern Xiongnu had migrated west towards the Ili River valley.

The Southern Xiongnu—who had been situated in the Ordos region since about 50 AD—remained within the territory of the Han empire as semi-independent tributaries. They were dependent on the Han empire for their livelihood as indicated by a memorial (Note: The translation given by Lewis (2007, 137) states: "Your servant humbly thinks back on how since his ancestor submitted to the Han we have been blessed with your support, keeping a sharp watch on the passes and providing strong armies for more than forty years. Your subjects have been born and reared in Han territory and have depended entirely on the Han for food. Each year we received gifts counted in the hundreds of millions [of cash].") from the Southern Chanyu to the Han court in 88 AD. Following the military successes against the Xiongnu, General Ban Chao was promoted to the position of Protector General and stationed in Kucha in 91 AD. At the remote frontier, Ban Chao reaffirmed absolute Han control over the Western Regions from 91 AD onwards.

== Impact ==
=== Military ===
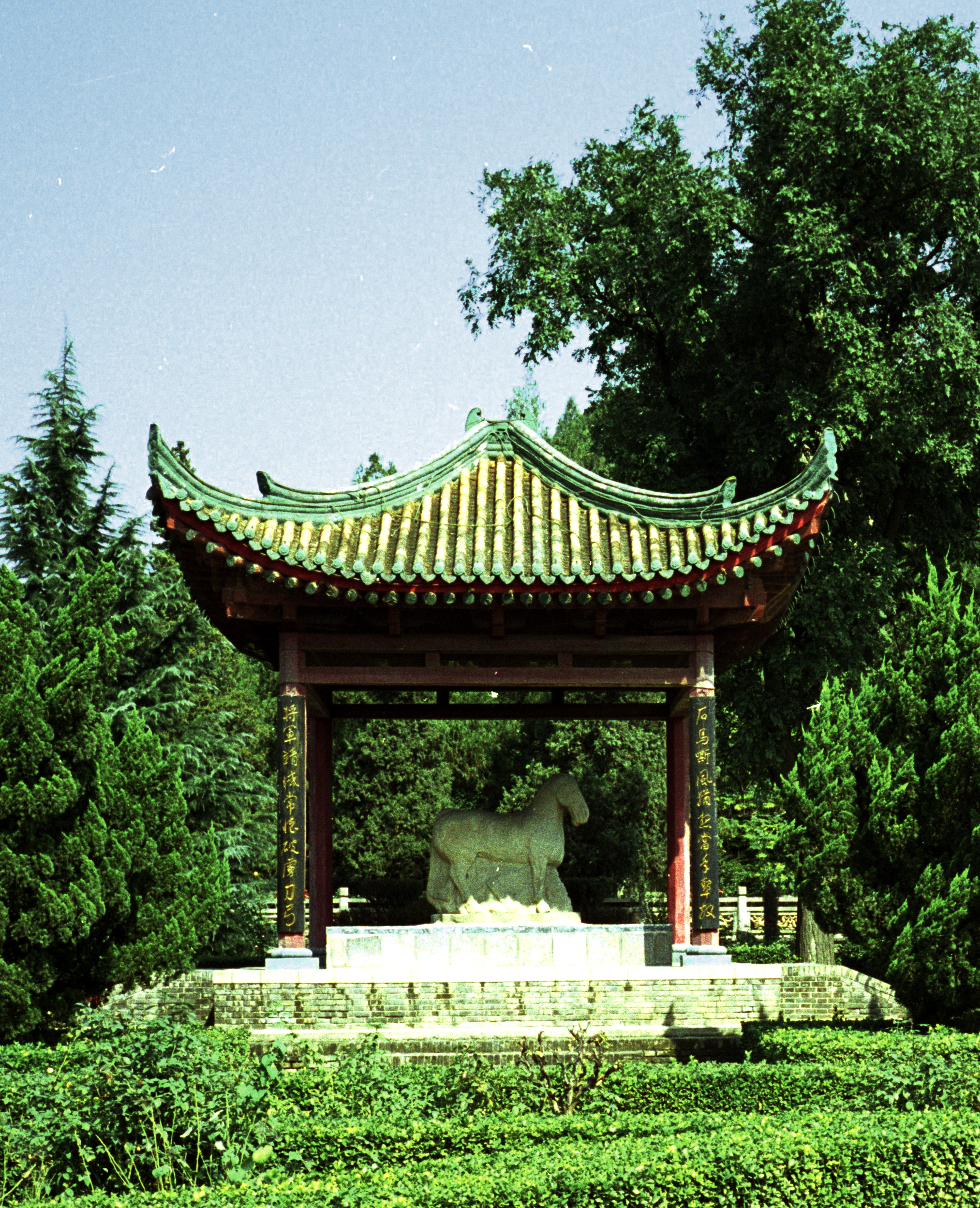
The statue Horse Stepping on a Xiongnu Soldier, dated to the Western Han period, from the tomb of General Huo Qubing near present-day Xi'an

Chao Cuo was one of the first known ministers to suggest to Emperor Wen that Han armies should have a cavalry-centric army to counter the nomadic Xiongnu to the north, since Han armies were still primarily infantry with cavalry and chariots playing a supporting role. He advocated for the policy of "using barbarians to attack barbarians", that is, incorporating surrendered Xiongnu and other nomadic tribes into the Han military, a suggestion that was eventually adopted, especially with the establishment of dependent states of different nomads living on the Han empire's frontiers.

In a memorandum entitled Guard the Frontiers and Protect the Borders that he presented to the throne in 169 BC, Chao compared the relative strengths of Xiongnu and Han battle tactics. In regards to the Han armies, Chao deemed the Xiongnu horsemen better prepared for rough terrain due to their better horses, better with horseback archery, and better able to withstand the elements and harsh climates. However, on level plains, he regarded Xiongnu cavalry inferior especially when faced with Han shock cavalry and chariots as the Xiongnu were easily dispersed. He emphasized that the Xiongnu were incapable of countering their superior equipment and weaponry. He also noted that in contrast the Han armies were better capable to fight in disciplined formations. According to Chao, the Xiongnu were also defenseless against coordinated onslaughts of arrows—especially long-ranged and in unison—due to their inferior leather armour and wooden shields. When dismounted in close combat, he believed that the Xiongnu, lacking the ability as infantry, would be decimated by Han soldiers.

During Emperor Jing's reign, the Han court initiated breeding programs for military horses and established 36 large government pastures in the border regions, extending from Liaodong to Beidi. In preparation for the military use of the horses, the best breeds were selected to partake in military training. The Xiongnu frequently raided the Han government pastures, because the military horses were of great strategic importance for the Han military against them. By the time of Emperor Wu's reign, the horses amounted to well over 450,000.

At the start of Emperor Wu's reign, the Han empire had a standing army comprising 400,000 troops, which included 80,000 to 100,000 cavalrymen, essential to the future campaigns against the Xiongnu. However, by 124 BC, that number had grown to a total of 600,000 to 700,000 troops, including 200,000 to 250,000 cavalrymen. In order to sustain the military expeditions against the Xiongnu and its resulting conquests, Emperor Wu and his economic advisors undertook many economic and financial reforms, which proved to be highly successful.

In 14 AD, Yan Yu presented the difficulties of conducting extended military campaigns against the Xiongnu. For a 300-day campaign, each Han soldier needed 360 liters of dried grain. These heavy supplies had to be carried by oxen, but experience showed that an ox could only survive for about 100 days in the desert. Once in the territory of the Xiongnu, the harsh weather would also prove to be very inhospitable for the Han soldiers, who could not carry enough fuel for the winter. For these reasons, according to Yan Yu, military expeditions seldom lasted longer than 100 days.

For their western campaigns against the Xiongnu, the Han armies exacted their food supplies from the Western Regions. This placed a heavy burden on the western states, thus the Han court decided to initiate agricultural garrisons in Bugur and Kurla. During Emperor Zhao's reign (87–74 BC), the agricultural garrison in Bugur was expanded to accommodate the heavy Han military presence which was the natural result of the empire's westward expansion. During Emperor Xuan's reign (74–49 BC), the farming soldiers in Kurla were increased to 1,500 under Protector-General Zheng Ji's administration in order to support the military expeditions against the Xiongnu in Turfan. Immediately after the Han conquest of Turfan, Zheng established an agricultural garrison in Turfan. Even though, the Xiongnu unsuccessfully tried to prevent the Han from making Turfan into a major economic base by military force and threats.

=== Diplomacy ===
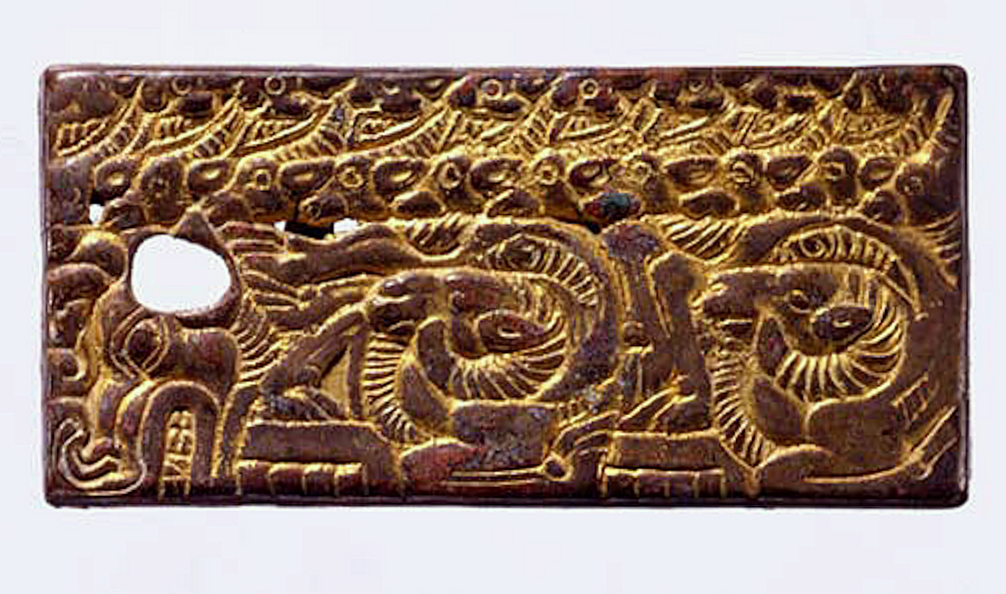
Belt Buckle with nomadic-inspired zoomorphic design, manufactured in China for the Xiongnu. Mercury-gilded bronze (a Chinese technique). North China, 3rd–2nd century BC.

In 162 BC, the Xiongnu troops of Laoshang Chanyu had invaded and driven the Yuezhi from their homeland; the Chanyu had the Yuezhi monarch executed and his skull fashioned into a drinking cup. Thus the Han court decided it was favourable to send an envoy to the Yuezhi to secure a military alliance. In 138 BC, the diplomat Zhang Qian left with an envoy and headed towards the Yuezhi encampments. However, the envoy was captured by the Xiongnu and held hostage. A decade went by, until Zhang Qian and some of his convoy escaped. They travelled to the territories of Ferghana (Dayuan), Soghdiana (Kangju), and Bactria (Daxia), ultimately finding the Yuezhi forces north of the Amu River. Despite their efforts, the envoy could not secure a military alliance. As the Yuezhi had settled in those new lands for quite some time, they had almost no desire to wage a war against the Xiongnu. In 126 BC, Zhang Qian headed to the Hexi Corridor in order to return home. While traveling through the area, he was captured by the Xiongnu, only to escape a year later and return to China in 125 BC.

The Xiongnu attempted to negotiate peace several times, but every time the Han court would accept nothing less than tributary submission of the Xiongnu. Tributary relations with the Han was composed of several things. Firstly, the chanyu or his representative was required to come pay homage to the Han court. Secondly the heir apparent or a prince needed to be delivered to the Han court as hostage. Thirdly, the chanyu had to present tribute to the Han emperor and in return would receive imperial gifts. Accepting the tributary system meant that the Xiongnu were lowered to the status of outer vassal, while the marriage alliance meant that the two nations were regarded as equal states. In 119 BC, Yizhixie Chanyu (r. 126–114 BC) sent an envoy, hoping to achieve peaceful relations with the Han. However, the peace negotiations collapsed, since the Han court disregarded his terms and gave him the option to become an outer vassal instead, which infuriated Yizhixie Chanyu. In 107 BC, Wuwei Chanyu (r. 114–105 BC) also attempted to negotiate peaceful relations and even halted the border raids. In response, the Han disregarded his terms and demanded that the Chanyu send his heir apparent as a hostage to Chang'an, which once again led to the breakdown of the peace negotiations.

In 53 BC, Huhanye Chanyu decided to submit to the Han court. He sent his son Zhulouqutang, the Tuqi King of the Right, as hostage to the Han court in 53 BC. In 52 BC, he formally requested through the officials at the Wuyuan commandery to have an audience with the Han court to pay homage. Thus, the next year, he arrived at court and personally paid homage to Emperor Xuan during the Chinese New Year. In 49 BC, Huhanye traveled to the Han court for a second time to pay homage to the Emperor. In 53 BC, Zhizhi Chanyu also sent his son as hostage to the Han court. In 51 and 50 BC, Zhizhi sent two envoys respectively to Han to present tribute, but failed to personally come to the Han court to pay homage. Therefore, he was rejected by the Han court, leading to the execution of a Han envoy in 45 BC. In 33 BC, Huhanye Chanyu came to the Han court to pay homage again. During his visit, he asked to become an imperial son-in-law. Instead of granting him this request, Emperor Yuan decided to give him a court lady-in-waiting. Thus, the Han court allowed Huhanye Chanyu to marry Lady Wang Zhaojun. Yituzhiyashi, the son of Huhanye and Wang Zhaojun, became a vocal partisan for the Han empire within the Xiongnu realm. Although peaceful relations were momentarily achieved, it fully collapsed when the Han official Wang Mang came to power.

When Bi, the Southern Chanyu, decided submit to the Han in 50 AD, he sent a princely son as hostage to the Han court and prostrated to the Han envoy as he received the imperial edict from them. During the Eastern Han period, the tributary system had made some significant changes, which placed the Southern Xiongnu more tightly under regulation and supervision of the Han. The Chanyu was required to send tribute and a princely hostage annually, while an imperial messenger would be dispatched to escort the previous princely hostage back. The Southern Xiongnu were resettled inside the empire at the northern commanderies and were overseen by a Han prefect, who acted as an arbiter in their legal cases and monitored their movements. Attempts by Punu, the Northern Chanyu, to establish peaceful relations with the Han empire always failed, because the Northern Xiongnu were unwilling to come under Han's tributary system and the Han court had no interest to treat them along the same lines as the Southern Xiongnu instead of dividing them.

=== Geography ===
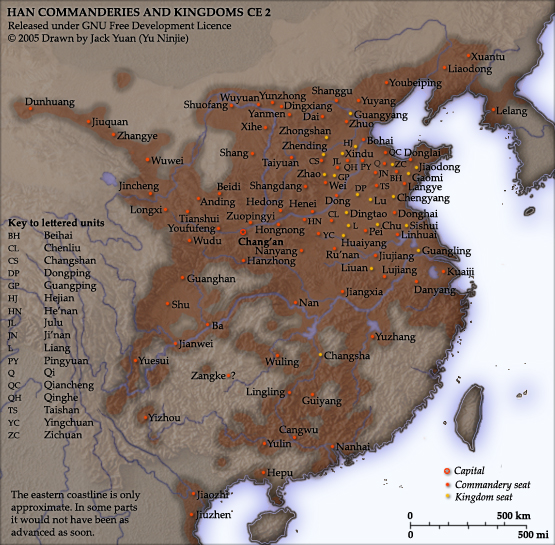
Commanderies of the Han empire, 2 AD

In 169 BC, the Han minister Chao Cuo presented to Emperor Wen a memorandum on frontier defence and the importance of agriculture. Chao characterized the Xiongnu as people whose livelihood did not depend on permanent settlement and were always migrating. As such, he wrote, that the Xiongnu could observe the Han frontier and attack when there were too few troops stationed in a certain region. He noted that if troops were mobilized in support, then few troops would be insufficient to defeat the Xiongnu, while many troops would arrive too late as the Xiongnu would have retreated by then. He also noted that keeping the Xiongnu mobilized would be at a great expense, while they would just raid another time after dispersing them. To negate these difficulties, Chao Cuo made a proposal, which in essence suggested that military-agricultural settlements with permanent residents should be established to secure the frontier and that surrendered tribes should serve along the frontier against the Xiongnu.

When Emperor Wu made the decision to conquer the Hexi Corridor, he had the intention to separate the Xiongnu from the Western Regions and from the Qiang people. In 88 BC, the Xianling tribe of the Qiang people sent an envoy to the Xiongnu, proposing a joint-attack against the Han in the region as they were discontented and had lost the fertile lands at Jiuquan and Zhangye. It had often been the meeting place between the Xiongnu and the Qiang before the Han empire had conquered and annexed the Hexi Corridor. In 6 BC, Wang Shun and Liu Xin noted that the frontier commanderies of Jiuquan, Zhangye, and Dunhuang were established by Emperor Wu to separate the then-powerful Chuoqiang tribe of the Qiang people from the Xiongnu. The Chuoqiang tribe and its king, however, eventually submitted to the Han empire and took part in the campaigns against the Xiongnu.

In 119 BC, when the Xiongnu suffered a catastrophic defeat by the Han armies, the Chanyu moved his court (located in present-day Inner Mongolia) to another location north. This had the desired result that the Xiongnu were separated from the Wuhuan people, which also prevented the Xiongnu from exacting many resources from the Wuhuan. The Han court placed the Wuhuan in tributary protection and resettled them in five northeastern commanderies, namely Shanggu, Yuyang, Youbeiping (present-day Hebei), Liaoxi, and Liaodong (present-day Liaoning). A new office, the Colonel-Protector of the Wuhuan, was established in Shanggu in order to prevent contact between the Wuhuan with the Xiongnu and to use them to monitor the Xiongnu activities. Nevertheless, the effective Han control over the Wuhuan was lacking through much of the Western Han period, since the Xiongnu had considerable military and political influence over the Wuhuan while relations between the Wuhuan and Han were often strained at best. This can be exemplified by a situation in 78 BC, when the Xiongnu led a punitive campaign against the Wuhuan, resulting in General Fan Mingyou leading a Han army to impede further incursions. When they learned that the Xiongnu had left by the time the army arrived, the Han court ordered Fan to attack the Wuhuan instead, killing 6,000 Wuhuan men and three chieftains, since the Wuhuan had recently raided Han territory. Only in 49 AD, when 922 Wuhuan chieftains submitted during Emperor Guangwu's reign, did many of the Wuhuan tribes come under the tributary system of the Han empire. The Han court provided for the Wuhuan and in return the Wuhuan tribes guarded the Han frontier against the Xiongnu and other nomadic peoples.

When the Hunye King surrendered to the Han in 121 BC, the Han court resettled all the 40,000 Xiongnu people from the Hexi Corridor into the northern frontier regions. The Hexi Corridor proved to be an invaluable region, since it gave direct access and became the base of military operations into the Western Regions Possession of the Western Regions was economically critical to the Xiongnu, since they exacted many of their necessary resources from the western states. The diplomat Zhang Qian suggested to the Emperor to establish diplomatic relations with the western states. He proposed to try convince the Wusun in reoccupying their former territory in the Hexi Corridor and to form an alliance with them against the Xiongnu. In 115 BC, Zhang Qian and his men were sent towards the Western Regions, but they did not succeed in convincing the Wusun to relocate. They were, however, successful in establishing contact with the many states, such as Wusun, Dayuan (Ferghana), Kangju (Soghdiana), Daxia (Bactria), and Yutian (Khotan). Although the Han empire tried to diplomatically sway the western states over the years, it met with little success due to the Xiongnu's influence over the Western Regions at the time. Therefore, from 108 BC onwards, the Han resorted to conquest in order to bring the western states to submission.

Since Loulan (Cherchen) was the closest western state to Han, it was key for the Han empire's expansion into Central Asia. Turfan (Jushi), on the other hand, was the Xiongnu's entrance into the Western Regions. By conquering Loulan and Turfan, the Han empire would gain two critical locations in the Western Regions, achieving direct access to the Wusun in the Ili River valley and Dayuan (Ferghana) between Syr and Amu Darya. This happened in 108 BC, when General Zhao Ponu conquered these two states. The farthest-reaching invasion was Li Guangli's campaign against Ferghana. If the Han armies succeeded in conquering Ferghana, the Han empire would demonstrate certain military might to the western states and consolidate its control, while gaining many of the famed Ferghana horses. The Xiongnu were aware of the situation and attempted to stop the invasion, but they were defeated by Li Guangli's forces. After a campaign that lasted four years, Li Guangli conquered Ferghana in 101 BC.

The control over Turfan, however, often fluctuated due to its proximity to the Xiongnu. In 90 BC, General Cheng Wan led the troops of six western states against Turfan to prevent it from allying the Xiongnu. The fact that the forces used comprised solely from the troops of the western states was, as Lewis (2007) remarked, a clear indication of the political influence that the Han empire had over the region. Cheng was a former Xiongnu king himself, but he had submitted to the Han and was ennobled as Marquis of Kailing. As a result of the expedition, the Han court received the formal submission of Turfan later in the year. This victory was significant in the sense that Turfan's location was the closest to the Xiongnu of all the western states, thereby they lost their access into the Western Regions with this Han conquest.

In 67 BC, the Han empire gained absolute control over the Turfan Depression after inflicting a significant defeat on the Xiongnu. During the Xiongnu rule of the Western Regions, the area was under the jurisdiction of the Rizhu King with the office "Commandant in Charge of Slaves". However, in 60 BC, the Rizhu King surrendered to Protector General Zheng Ji. Afterwards, the Han imperial court established the Protectorate of the Western Regions. The Han empire, now in absolute control of the Western Regions, placed it under the jurisdiction of its Protector General. As its dominance of the area was established, the Han were effectively controlling the trade and shaping the early history of what would be known as the Silk Road.

In 25 AD, Liu Xiu was established as Emperor Guangwu, restoring the Han throne after a usurpation by the Han official Wang Mang, thus initiating the Eastern Han period. During his reign, the Han empire began to abandon its offensive strategy against the Xiongnu, which allowed the latter to frequently raid the northern frontier. It resulted in large migrations southwards, which led to the depopulation of the frontier regions. During the Eastern Han period, various nomadic peoples were resettled in these frontier regions, serving the Han empire as cavalry against the Xiongnu. With his primary focus still towards the interior of the empire, Emperor Guangwu declined several requests from the western states to re-establish the office of Protector-General of the Western Regions. Early in Emperor Guangwu's reign, King Kang of Yarkand united neighbouring kingdoms to resist the Xiongnu. At the same time, he protected the Han officials and people of the former Protector-General, who were still left after Wang Mang's reign. In 61 AD, Yarkand was conquered by Khotan and the western states fell in conflict with each other. Taking this opportunity, the Northern Xiongnu recovered their control over the Western Regions, which threatened the security of the Hexi Corridor. In 73 AD, General Dou Gu was sent on a punitive expedition to the Xiongnu and inflicted on them a considerable defeat. Immediately, the fertile lands of Hami (Yiwu) was reoccupied and an agricultural garrison established. The next year, he expelled the Xiongnu from Turfan and reoccupied the state. The recovery of Hami and Turfan facilitated the re-establishment of the Protector-General, since these important locations were key points to control the Western Regions.

== See also ==
- Book of Han, a classical historiographical work covering the early history of the Han empire
- Han conquest of Old Chosŏn, a military campaign launched by Emperor Wu against Old Chosŏn
- Han conquest of Nanyue, a military campaign launched by Emperor Wu against Nanyue
- Han dynasty in Inner Asia, expansion of realm and influence of the Han dynasty in Inner Asia
- Li Ling, a Han military leader and defector to the Xiongnu
- Shiji, a classical historiographical work written in this era
- Sima Qian, author of the Records of the Grand Historian who was punished for defending Li Ling
- Su Wu, a Han statesman and diplomat who was a captive of the Xiongnu for about two decades
- The Emperor in Han Dynasty, a 2005 Chinese television series based on the life story of Emperor Wu

== Bibliography ==
- Barfield, Thomas J. (1981). "The Hsiung-nu Imperial Confederacy: Organization and Foreign Policy". The Journal of Asian Studies. 41 (1): 45–61. doi:10.2307/2055601. JSTOR 2055601. S2CID 145078285.
- Barfield, Thomas J. (2001). "The Shadow Empires: Imperial State Formation Along the Chinese–Nomad Frontier". Empires: Perspectives from Archaeology and History. New York: Cambridge University Press. ISBN 978-0-521-77020-0.
- Baumer, Christoph (2003). Southern Silk Road: In the Footsteps of Sir Aurel Stein and Sven Hedin (2nd ed.). Orchid Press. ISBN 978-974-8304-38-0.
- Beckwith, Christopher I. (2009). Empires of the Silk Road: A History of Central Eurasia from the Bronze Age to the Present. Princeton: Princeton University Press. ISBN 978-0-691-15034-5.
- Bielenstein, Hans (1986). "Wang Mang, the Restoration of the Han Dynasty, and Later Han". The Cambridge History of China, Volume 1: The Ch'in and Han Empires, 221 B.C. – A.D. 220. Cambridge: Cambridge University Press. ISBN 0-521-24327-0.
- Boulnois, Luce (2004). Silk Road: Monks, Warriors & Merchants on the Silk Road (Translated ed.). Hong Kong: Odyssey. ISBN 978-962-217-720-8.
- Bowman, John S. (2000). Columbia Chronologies of Asian History and Culture. New York: Columbia University Press. ISBN 978-0-231-11004-4.
- Chang, Chun-shu (1966). "Military Aspects of Han Wu-ti's Northern and Northwestern Campaigns". Harvard Journal of Asiatic Studies. 26: 148–173. doi:10.2307/2718463. JSTOR 2718463.
- Chang, Chun-shu (2007a). The Rise of the Chinese Empire, Volume 1: Nation, State, and Imperialism in Early China, ca. 1600 B.C. – A.D. 8. Ann Arbor: University of Michigan Press. ISBN 978-0-472-11533-4.
- Chang, Chun-shu (2007b). The Rise of the Chinese Empire, Volume 2: Frontier, Immigration, & Empire in Han China, 130 B.C. – A.D. 157. Ann Arbor: University of Michigan Press. ISBN 978-0-472-11534-1.
- Cheng, Dalin (2005). "The Great Wall of China". Borders and Border Politics in a Globalizing World. Lanham: SR Books. ISBN 0-8420-5103-1.
- Christian, David (1998). A History of Russia, Central Asia, and Mongolia. Oxford: Blackwell Publishers. ISBN 978-0-631-20814-3.
- Cosmo, Nicola Di (1999). "The Northern Frontier in Pre-Imperial China". The Cambridge History of Ancient China. Cambridge: Cambridge University Press. ISBN 0-521-47030-7.
- Cosmo, Nicola Di (2002). Ancient China and its Enemies: The Rise of Nomadic Power in East Asian History. Cambridge: Cambridge University Press. ISBN 0-521-77064-5.
- Crespigny, Rafe de (2007). A Biographical Dictionary of Later Han to the Three Kingdoms (23–220 AD). Leiden: Brill Publishers. ISBN 978-90-04-15605-0.
- Crespigny, Rafe de (2009). "The Western Han Army". The Military Culture of Later Han. Cambridge: Harvard University Press. ISBN 978-0-674-03109-8.
- Deng, Yinke (2007). History of China (Translated ed.). Beijing: China Intercontinental Press. ISBN 978-7-5085-1098-9.
- Gernet, Jacques (1996). A History of Chinese Civilization (2nd ed.). Cambridge: Cambridge University Press. ISBN 0-521-49781-7.
- Golden, Peter B. (2011). Central Asia in World History. Oxford: Oxford University Press. ISBN 978-0-19-515947-9.
- Graff, David A. (2002). Medieval Chinese Warfare, 300–900. London, New York City: Routledge. ISBN 0-415-23955-9.
- Grousset, René (2002). The Empire of the Steppes: A History of Central Asia (8th print ed.). New Brunswick: Rutgers University Press. ISBN 978-0-8135-1304-1.
- Guo, Xuezhi (2002). The Ideal Chinese Political Leader: A Historical and Cultural Perspective. Westport: Praeger Publishers. ISBN 978-0-275-97259-2.
- Haar, Barend J. ter (2009). Het Hemels Mandaat: De Geschiedenis van het Chinese Keizerrijk (in Dutch). Amsterdam: Amsterdam University Press. ISBN 978-90-8964-120-5.
- Higham, Charles F.W. (2004). Encyclopedia of Ancient Asian Civilizations. New York: Facts On File. ISBN 978-0-8160-4640-9.
- Hulsewé, Anthony François Paulus (1979). China in Central Asia: The Early Stage, 125 B.C. – A.D. 23. Leiden: Brill. ISBN 978-90-04-05884-2.
- Lewis, Mark Edward (2000). "The Han Abolition of Universal Military Service". Warfare in Chinese History. Leiden: Brill Publishers. ISBN 978-90-04-11774-7.
- Lewis, Mark Edward (2007). The Early Chinese Empires: Qin and Han. Cambridge: Harvard University Press. ISBN 978-0-674-02477-9.
- Loewe, Michael (1986). "The Former Han Dynasty". The Cambridge History of China, Volume 1: The Ch'in and Han Empires, 221 B.C. – A.D. 220. Cambridge: Cambridge University Press. ISBN 0-521-24327-0.
- Loewe, Michael (2006). The Government of the Qin and Han Empires: 221 BCE – 220 CE. Indianapolis: Hackett Publishing Company. ISBN 978-0-87220-818-6.
- Loewe, Michael (2009). "The Western Han Army". Military Culture in Imperial China. Cambridge: Harvard University Press. ISBN 978-0-674-03109-8.
- Lovell, Julia (2006). The Great Wall: China Against the World, 1000 BC – AD 2000. New York: Grove Press. ISBN 978-0-8021-4297-9.
- Millward, James A. (1998). Beyond the pass: Economy, Ethnicity, and Empire in Qing Central Asia, 1759–1864. Stanford: Stanford University Press. ISBN 978-0-8047-2933-8.
- Millward, James (2006). Eurasian Crossroads: A History of Xinjiang. New York: Columbia University Press. ISBN 978-0-231-13924-3.
- Morton, William Scott; Lewis, Charlton M. (2005). China: Its History and Culture (4th ed.). New York: McGraw-Hill. ISBN 0-07-141279-4.
- Psarras, Sophia-Karin (2004). "Han and Xiongnu. A Reexamination of Cultural and Political Relations (II)". Monumenta Serica: Journal of Oriental Studies. 52: 37–93. doi:10.1080/02549948.2004.11731409. ISSN 0254-9948. JSTOR 40727309. S2CID 193415523.
- Sima, Qian (1993). Records of the Grand Historian: Han Dynasty II. Translated by Watson, Burton (Revised ed.). Hong Kong: Columbia University Press. ISBN 978-0-231-08167-2.
- Spakowski, Nicola (1999). Helden, Monumente, Traditionen: Nationale Identität und historisches Bewußtsein in der VR China (in German). Hamburg: Lit. ISBN 978-3-8258-4117-1.
- Tanner, Harold Miles (2009). China: A History. Indianapolis: Hackett. ISBN 978-0-87220-915-2.
- Torday, Laszlo (1997). Mounted Archers: The Beginning of Central Asian History. Edinburgh: Durham Academic Press. ISBN 1-900838-03-6.
- Tucker, Spencer C.; et al. (2010). A Global Chronology of Conflict: From the Ancient World to the Modern Middle East. Santa Barbara: ABC-CLIO. ISBN 978-1-85109-667-1.
- Whiting, Marvin C. (2002). Imperial Chinese Military History: 8000 BC – 1912 AD. Lincoln: iUniverse. ISBN 978-0-595-22134-9.
- Wintle, Justin (2002). The Rough Guide: History of China. London: Rough Guides. ISBN 978-1-85828-764-5.
- Wu, Shu-hui (2013). "Debates and Decision-Making: The Battle of the Altai Mountains (Jinweishan 金微山) in AD 91". Debating War in Chinese History. Leiden: Brill. ISBN 978-90-04-22372-1.
- Yamashita, Michael; Lindesay, William (2007). The Great Wall: From Beginning to End. New York: Sterling Publishing. ISBN 978-1-4027-3160-0.
- Yü, Ying-shih (1967). Trade and Expansion in Han China: Study in the Structure of Sino-Barbarian Economic Relations. Berkeley: University of California Press. ISBN 978-0-520-01374-2.
- Yü, Ying-shih (1986). "Han Foreign Relations". The Cambridge History of China, Volume 1: The Ch'in and Han Empires, 221 B.C. – A.D. 220. Cambridge: Cambridge University Press. ISBN 0-521-24327-0.
- Yü, Ying-shih (1994). "The Hsiung-nu". The Cambridge History of Early Inner Asia. Cambridge: Cambridge University Press. ISBN 978-0-521-24304-9.
- Yü, Ying-shih (2002). "Nomads and Han China". Expanding Empires: Cultural Interaction and Exchange in World Societies from Ancient to Early Modern Times. Wilmington: Scholarly Resources. ISBN 978-0-8420-2731-1.
- Zadneprovskiy, Y.A. (1999). "The Nomads of Northern Central Asia After the Invasion of Alexander". History of Civilizations of Central Asia, Volume 2 (1st Indian ed.). Delhi: Motilal Banarsidass Publishing. ISBN 81-208-1408-8.
