= Xiongnu invasion of Donghu =

Modu Chanyu's campaign against Donghu confederation in 206 BC

- Part of the Campaigns of Modu Chanyu
Date	206 BC
Location	Inner Mongolia
Result	Xiongnu victory: Donghu confederation came under Xiongnu rule

Belligerents
Xiongnu	Donghu Confederation

Commanders and leaders
Modu Chanyu	Unknown leader †

Casualties and losses
Unknown	Heavy

The Xiongnu invasion of Donghu was a conflict between the Xiongnu and Donghu after Modu Chanyu came to power in 209 BC. Modu Chanyu used the perceived weakness of the Xiongnu to his advantage and defeated the Donghu confederation, killing their leader and taking a great number of prisoners and livestock.

== See also ==
- Battle of Baideng
- Han–Xiongnu Wars
- Han dynasty

== Sources ==
- Barfield, Thomas J. (1989). The Perilous Frontier: Nomadic Empires and China 221 B.C. to AD 1757 (Studies in Social Discontinuity). Blackwell. ISBN 1-55786-043-2.
- Sinor, Denis (2008) [1990]. The Cambridge History of Early Inner Asia. Cambridge: Cambridge University Press. ISBN 9781139054898.
- Kim, Hyun Jin (2015). The Huns (PDF). Oxford: Routledge. ISBN 9781317340911.
