= Wang Han =

Wang Han is the name of:

- Wang Han (diver) (born 1991), Chinese diver
- Wang Han (host) (born 1974), Chinese TV show host
- Wang Han (poet) (fl. 8th century), Tang dynasty poet
- Wang Han (swimmer) (born 1954), Taiwanese actor and swimmer

== See also ==
- Han Wang (disambiguation)
