= Hanwang =

Hanwang is an atonal pinyin romanization of various Chinese names and words.

It may refer to:

- Mount Hanwang (汉王山), an informal name for Bozhong Mountain in China's Shaanxi Province

== Towns and townships in China ==
- Hanwang, Gansu (汉王), a town in Longnan, Gansu
- Hanwang, Jiangsu (汉王), a town in Xuzhou, Jiangsu
- Hanwang, Hanzhong (汉王), a town in Hanzhong, Shaanxi
- Hanwang, Ziyang County (汉王), a town in Ziyang County, Shaanxi
- Hanwang, Sichuan (汉旺), a town in Mianzhu, Sichuan
- Hanwang Township (寒王乡), a township in Zuoquan County, Shanxi

== See also ==
- Han Wang (disambiguation)
