= Junchen =

- Chanyu of the Xiongnu Empire
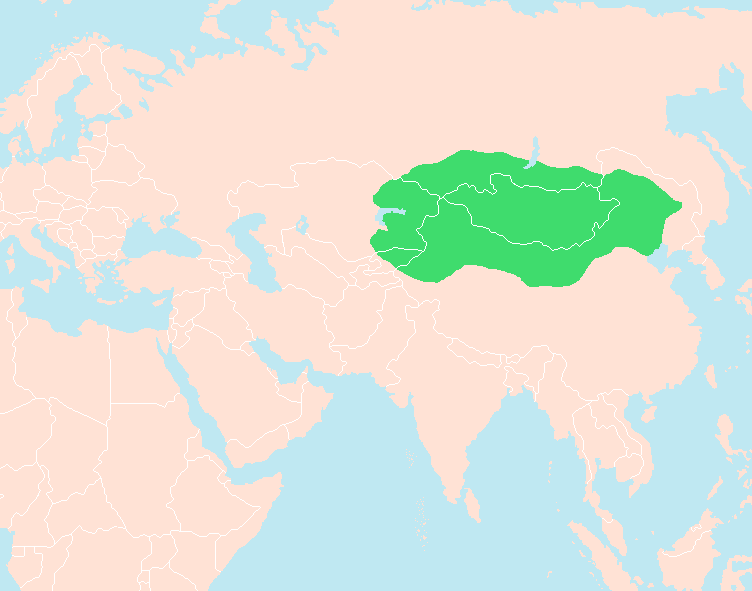
- Domain and influence of the Xiongnu
- Reign: c. 161–126 BCE
- Predecessor: Laoshang Chanyu
- Successor: Yizhixie Chanyu
- Died: 126 BCE
- Father: Laoshang Chanyu

Junchen (Chinese: 軍臣, Old Chinese (ZS): *kun-gin; r. 161–126 BCE) was the son and successor to Laoshang Chanyu. As chanyu of the Xiongnu Empire, Junchen outlived the Han emperors Wen (r. 180–157 BC) and Jing (r. 157–141 BC). He died during the reign of the Emperor Wu of Han (r. 141–87 BC). All three Han emperors confirmed the heqin peace and kinship treaty with the Xiongnu.

== Life ==
Junchen succeeded his father, Laoshang Chanyu, in 161 BCE.

Although peace with the Han dynasty generally persisted under his reign, Xiongnu raids still occurred in 158, 148, 144, and 142 BCE. The Chinese annals note that mutual relations were imperiled on a number of occasions, which included appeals of the Chinese contenders for the Xiongnu's assistance and protection, the Xiongnu's retaliatory raids as punishments for violation of the treaty terms, and one direct Chinese assault against the Chanyu. The Xiongnu were especially sensitive about unimperiled trade relations, which were one of the terms of the heqin treaty, and the Chinese annals specifically note a number of instances of the border trade opening, implying that the border trade was at times banned.

In mid 133 BCE, Junchen led a force of 100,000 to attack Mayi in Shuofang, Dai Commandery. Wang Hui and two other generals attempted to ambush the Xiongnu at Mayi with a large force of 300,000, but Junchen retreated after learning about the ambush from a captured local warden. Wang Hui decided not to give chase and was sentenced to death. He committed suicide. The Han army abandoned chariots after this point.

After the failed ambush, the treaty was practically repealed, relations soured and border traders were assaulted.

In early 129 BC, Wei Qing and three other generals led a cavalry force of 40,000 in an attack on the Xiongnu at the frontier markets of Shanggu. Wei Qing successfully killed several thousand Xiongnu and took 700 prisoners. General Gongsun Ao was defeated and lost 7,000 men. He was reduced to commoner status. Li Guang was defeated and captured but escaped by feigning death and returned to base. He was also reduced to commoner status. Gongsun He failed to find the Xiongnu. Later Xiongnu attacked Yuyang in You Province in retaliation.

In late 128 BC, Wei Qing and Li Xi led a force of 40,000 and defeated the Xiongnu north of Yanmen Commandery.

In 127 BC the Chinese army attacked and expelled the Xiongnu tribes Loufan and Bayan from the Ordos, and then built fortifications and forts to retain the captured territory.

In 126 BC, the Xiongnu led a force of 90,000 under the Wise King (Tuqi) of the Right to attack Dai Commandery, killing its grand administrator Gong You. They also raided Dingxiang and Shang, taking several thousand captives. Junchen died in the same year and his younger brother, an Eastern Luli-Prince Yizhixie Chanyu (or Ichisye) ascended the throne (r. 126–114 BCE).

Preceded by Laoshang Chanyu	Chanyu of the Xiongnu Empire; 161–126 BCE	Succeeded by Yizhixie Chanyu
