= Yizhixie =

Chanyu of the Xiongnu Empire

- Chanyu
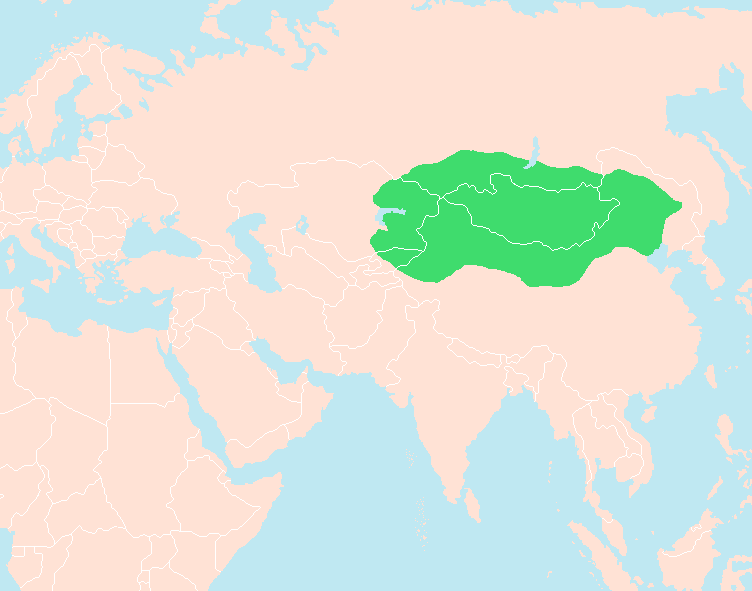
- Domain and influence of the Xiongnu
- Reign: c. 126–114 BC
- Predecessor: Junchen Chanyu
- Successor: Wuwei Chanyu
- Died: 114 BC
- Father: Laoshang Chanyu

Yizhixie (Chinese: 伊稚邪; Late Old Chinese: *ʔi-ḍiᴴ-ja; r. 126–114 BC) was the brother of Junchen Chanyu and his successor to the Xiongnu throne. Yizhixie ruled during a time of conflict with the Han dynasty under the military expansionist Emperor Wu (r. 141–87 BC).

== Defeating Yudan ==
Originally the Eastern Luli-Prince, Yizhixie, a younger brother of Junchen, had to stage a coup against the previous chanyu's son Yudan, the Eastern Tuqi (Wise Prince). Yudan was defeated by Yizhixie in battle and fled to the Han dynasty, where Emperor Wu gave him a princely title. A few months later Yudan died.

[In the Xiongnu state] there are the Left and Right Wise Kings, Left and Right Luli Kings, Left and Right Generals, Left and Right Commandants, Left and Right Household Administrators and Left and Right Gudu Marquises. The Xiongnu word for "wise" is tuqi, therefore they often refer to the Heir Apparent as the Tuqi King of the Left. Starting from the Wise Kings of the Left and Right, down to the Household Administrators, the most important ones [command] ten thousand horsemen, the least important a few thousand; altogether they are referred to as the twenty-four high dignitaries.

— Records of the Grand Historian

== Life ==
In 125 BC, the Xiongnu raided Chinese provinces in 3 groups, each with 30,000 cavalry. The Western Jükü-Prince, angry that Chinese Court took Ordos and built Shuofang, attacked the borders of China a few times; and when he entered the Ordos, plundered Shuofang, and killed and captured many officials and other people.

In early 124 BC, Wei Qing and four other generals led a force of 100,000, mostly light cavalry, against the Xiongnu. The Tuqi of the Right assumed they would turn back after he retreated, but they did not, and he was surprised at his camp. The Han emerged victorious, capturing ten petty chieftains, 15,000 Xiongnu, and one million livestock.

In early 123 BC, Wei Qing and others led 100,000 cavalry against the Xiongnu, killing and capturing 3,000 north of Dingxiang. However Su Jian and Zhao Xin advanced too far with only 3,000 and were cut down. Zhao Xin defected while Su Jian managed to escape. Zhao Xin was originally a Xiongnu prince who had defected to the Han. He married one of Yizhixie's sisters and became his chief adviser on China. He convinced Yizhixie to move his capital further north of the Gobi Desert in order to avoid Han invasions and to lure them deeper into the steppes.

In 122 BC, a Xiongnu force of 10,000 raided Shanggu.

In early 121 BC, Huo Qubing led a force of 10,000 cavalry and killed 8,960 Xiongnu west of the Yanzhi Mountains (in modern Gansu). In the middle of the year he and several others marched west. Huo made it as far as the Qilian Mountains south of Jiuquan, killing and capturing 33,000 Xiongnu. The Xiongnu also invaded Yanmen Commandery so Li Guang and Zhang Qian gave chase. Li Guang was suddenly surrounded by 40,000 Xiongnu under the Tuqi of the Left but held off repeated attacks for two days until Zhang Qian arrived and the Xiongnu retreated. Zhang Qian was demoted to commoner status for arriving late.

In 120 BC, the Xiongnu raided Youbeiping and Dingxiang, carrying off 1,000 captives.

In mid 119 BC, Wei Qing and Huo Qubing led a large force of 100,000 cavalry, 200,000 infantry, and 140,000 supply horses against the Xiongnu. When the Han forces arrived, they found the Xiongnu already prepared and waiting and the Battle of Mobei commenced. Wei surrounded himself in a fortified ring of chariots and sent out 5,000 cavalry to probe the enemy. Yizhixie responded with 10,000 cavalry. The two sides skirmished until evening when a strong wind arose, at which point Wei committed most of his cavalry and encircled the Xiongnu. Yizhixie attempted to break out of the encirclement but lost control of his men and was routed. Huo's forces advanced by another route and defeated the Tuqi of the Left. Li Guang failed to rendezvous on time and committed suicide. A hundred thousand horses were lost during the campaign, crippling Han cavalry forces for some time.

The Xiongnu surrounded Li Guang's army and wiped out most of the men. Zhang Qian was accused of having arrived late at his rendezvous with Li Guang and was sentenced to execution, but on payment of a fine he was allowed to become a commoner. This same year the Han sent the swift cavalry general Huo Qubing against the Xiongnu. He defeated and killed 30,000 or 40,000 of the Xiongnu in the western region and rode as far as the Qilian Mountains. The following year the Hunye king led his barbarian hordes and surrendered to the Han, and the Xiongnu completely disappeared from the region from Jincheng and Hexi west along the Southern Mountains to the Salt Swamp. Occasionally Xiongnu scouts would appear, but even they were rare. Two years later the Han armies attacked the Shanyu and chased him north of the desert.

— Records of the Grand Historian

Yizhixie was angered by two serious defeats inflicted by Huo Qubing and ordered his commanders to report to court. Both princes were scared of punishment, Prince Hunie wanted them to flee to China, but Prince Syuchu refused, so Hunie killed him. The treason of Hunie considerably tipped the balance of power in favor of the Han. In the Chinese raids between 124 and 119 BC, the Xiongnu lost, per Chinese annals, 300,000 killed or captured military and civilian people.

In 116 BC, the Xiongnu raided Liang Province.

In 114 BC, Yizhixie died and was succeeded by his son, Wuwei Chanyu.

== Footnotes ==
Preceded by Junchen	Chanyu of the Xiongnu Empire; 126–114 BCE	Succeeded by Wuwei Chanyu
