= Cheng, King of Han =

- Traditional Chinese: 韓成
- Simplified Chinese: 韩成
Transcriptions
Standard Mandarin
- Hanyu Pinyin: Hán Chéng

Han Wang Cheng
- Traditional Chinese: 韓王成
- Simplified Chinese: 韩王成
- Literal meaning: Cheng, King of Han
Transcriptions
Standard Mandarin
- Hanyu Pinyin: Hán Wáng Chéng

Han Cheng (died 206 BC), also referred to as Cheng, King of Han in some Chinese historical texts, was a ruler of the Kingdom of Hán (韓國) of the Eighteen Kingdoms during the Chu–Han Contention, an interregnum between the Qin and Han dynasties of China.

== Life ==
Han Cheng was a descendant of the royal family of the Hán state during the Warring States period. He lived as a commoner during the Qin dynasty after his native state was conquered by the Qin state in 230 BC.

In 209 BC, when uprisings against the Qin dynasty broke out throughout China, Han Cheng joined Xiang Liang's rebel group, hoping to leverage their military power to revive the Hán state. Along the way, he met Zhang Liang, a descendant of a bureaucratic family of the former Hán state. Zhang Liang succeeded in persuading Xiang Liang to restore the former Hán state, and Han Cheng was appointed as its ruler with Zhang Liang serving as his chancellor. Xiang Liang also provided some troops to Han Cheng and allowed him to attack the Qin garrison at Yingchuan.

After the fall of the Qin dynasty in 206 BC, Xiang Yu divided the former Qin territories into the Eighteen Kingdoms. Han Cheng was appointed as the King of Han. Months later, Xiang Yu killed Han Cheng and replaced him with Zheng Chang.

Chinese royalty
Preceded by None	King of Hán; 206 BC	Succeeded by Zheng Chang
