= Zheng Chang =

- Traditional Chinese: 鄭昌
- Simplified Chinese: 郑昌
Transcriptions
Standard Mandarin
- Hanyu Pinyin: Zhèng Chāng
- Wade–Giles: Cheng Ch'ang

Zheng Chang was a ruler of the Kingdom of Hán of the Eighteen Kingdoms during the Chu–Han Contention, an interregnum between the Qin and Han dynasties of China.

Zheng Chang was initially the magistrate of Wu County (present-day Suzhou, Jiangsu) during the Qin dynasty. He was an acquaintance of Xiang Yu, and had followed the latter in rebelling against the Qin dynasty around 209 BC. After the fall of the Qin dynasty in 206 BC, Xiang Yu divided the former Qin territories into the Eighteen Kingdoms, and appointed Han Cheng as the King of Hán. Months later, Xiang Yu killed Han Cheng and replaced him with Zheng Chang. Later that year, Hán Xin attacked the Hán kingdom with support from Liu Bang and defeated Zheng Chang, who surrendered and was replaced by Hán Xin as the King of Hán.

Chinese royalty
Preceded by Han Cheng	King of Hán; 206 BC – 205 BC	Succeeded by Hán Xin
