= Wang Han (swimmer) =

Taiwanese actor and swimmer

Personal information
- Born: 1954 (age 71–72) Hsinchu County, Taiwan

Sport
- Sport: Swimming

Wang Han (Chinese: 王瀚; born 1954) is a Taiwanese actor and swimmer.

== Biography ==
A native of Hsinchu County, Wang was born in 1954. He began swimming in the Touqian River at a young age, and in college, started swimming the ocean. Wang's first publicized attempt at long-distance swimming in 1985 was funded by the actors' guild of which Wang held membership. He swam from Donggang, Pingtung, to Liuqiu Island in approximately six hours. Subsequently at age 31, he chose to retire from acting and modeling to concentrate on swimming. In August 1986, Wang swam the Strait of Gibraltar. From 1988 to 1998, Wang traversed one body of water per year, including the English Channel (1988), Bosporus (1989), the channels of the Hawaiian Islands around Maui (1990), the Strait of Juan de Fuca (1993), the Tsugaru Strait (1994), Cleveland Bay (1996), and the Strait of Sicily (1998). He had originally planned to swim the Taiwan Strait in 1998, but did not do so, as it was too soon after the Third Taiwan Strait Crisis. Wang was consulted about plans to swim the Taiwan Strait in 2001, and scheduled his own attempt throughout 2007, after receiving help from Chi Cheng. The 2007 attempt was unsuccessful, and Wang made plans for the strait in January 2008, though this last attempt received no further media coverage.
