= Xin of Han =

Han Xin
- Traditional Chinese: 韓信
- Simplified Chinese: 韩信
Transcriptions
Standard Mandarin
- Hanyu Pinyin: Hán Xìn
- Wade–Giles: Han Hsin

Xin, King of Han
- Traditional Chinese: 韓王信
- Simplified Chinese: 韩王信
- Literal meaning: Xin, King of Han
Transcriptions
Standard Mandarin
- Hanyu Pinyin: Hán Wáng Xìn

Xin, King of Hán (died c.March 196 BC), also known as Hán Xin and as Hán Wang Xin, was a noble of the early Han dynasty of China and a descendant of the royal family of Hán during the Warring States period. He was made King of Hán (韓王) in 205 BC by Liu Bang, the founding emperor of the Hàn dynasty, and became a vassal of the Hàn Empire. In 201 BC, after he was suspected of conspiring with the Xiongnu against the Hàn Empire, he defected to the Xiongnu and was eventually killed in a battle between the Hàn Empire and Xiongnu in 196 BC.

== Early life ==
Hán Xin was a grandson of King Xiang of Hán during the Warring States period. Around 207 BC, he joined Liu Bang's rebel group in Henan and worked together with other rebel groups throughout China to eventually overthrow the Qin dynasty in 206 BC. After the fall of the Qin dynasty, China was divided into the Eighteen Kingdoms and Liu Bang was made the King of Hàn (漢王), with his domain in the remote Bashu region (present-day Chongqing and Sichuan).

== Chu–Han contention ==
In late 206 BC, Liu Bang led his army out of Bashu to attack the Three Qins. This marked the beginning of the Chu–Han Contention – a four-year power struggle for supremacy over China between Liu Bang and his rival Xiang Yu. At that time, the restored Hán kingdom was being ruled by Zheng Chang, who had been appointed King of Hán (韓王) by Xiang Yu. Liu Bang promised to help Hán Xin become the King of Hán, and sent him with some troops to attack Zheng Chang's kingdom. By the following year, Hán Xin had conquered more than ten cities in the Hán kingdom, forced Zheng Chang to surrender, and replaced Zheng Chang as the King of Hán.

In 204 BC, after Liu Bang was defeated by Xiang Yu at the Battle of Xingyang, Hán Xin was captured by Xiang Yu and forced to surrender. Later, he managed to escape and return to Liu Bang's side. Hán Xin was reinstated as the King of Hán and became a vassal of the Hàn Empire after Liu Bang defeated Xiang Yu in 202 BC and became emperor of the Hàn dynasty. Hán Xin was granted the lands around Yingchuan as his vassal kingdom, with the capital at Yangzhai (陽翟; present-day Yuzhou, Henan).

== Defection to the Xiongnu ==
In 201 BC, Liu Bang realised that the Hán vassal kingdom was in a strategic location and might pose a threat to his Hàn Empire if Hán Xin were to turn against him. As such, he relocated the Hán vassal kingdom to Taiyuan Commandery with the capital at Jinyang (晉陽; present-day Taiyuan, Shanxi) under the pretext of sending Hán Xin to defend the northern border from the Xiongnu. When Hán Xin requested to have his capital at Mayi (present-day Shuozhou, Shanxi), the emperor approved his request.

Shortly after that, the Xiongnu attacked Mayi, leading Liu Bang to suspect that Hán Xin was secretly conspiring with the Xiongnu against him. The emperor then issued an imperial edict to reprimand Hán Xin for his failure to prevent the Xiongnu attack. Hán Xin knew that the emperor doubted his loyalty and feared that he and his family might be exterminated, so he betrayed the Hàn Empire and sided with the Xiongnu.

In late 200 BC, Liu Bang personally led his forces to attack Hán Xin and forced him to retreat to Xiongnu territory. However, Liu Bang eventually had to retreat after he was defeated by the Xiongnu at the Battle of Baideng. In the following years, Hán Xin and the Xiongnu constantly raided the Hàn Empire's northern border.

== Death ==
In 197 BC, Hán Xin sent Wang Huang (王黃) to convince Chen Xi to rebel against the Hàn Empire, which the latter did.

The following year, Hán Xin joined the Xiongnu in attacking the Hàn Empire and occupied Canhe (參合; present-day Yanggao County, Shanxi or Liangcheng County, Inner Mongolia). Chai Wu (柴武), the Hàn general assigned to fend off the Xiongnu invasion, wrote to Hán Xin, asking him to surrender to the Hàn Empire. Chai Wu also told Hán Xin that he had a chance of being pardoned since his betrayal was not as serious as compared to the other betrayals the emperor had experienced, so the emperor would be more inclined to show him mercy if he surrendered. However, Hán Xin refused, claiming he had already committed high treason three times by allying with the Xiongnu on three occasions to attack the Hàn Empire. He also cited the examples of Fan Li, Wen Zhong and Wu Zixu to imply that Liu Bang would not be as forgiving as Chai Wu claimed.

In the ensuing battle, Chai Wu massacred the population of Canhe and killed Hán Xin.

== Descendants ==
Hán Xin had at least two sons:

- Crown Prince of Hán (韓太子), who followed his father to Xiongnu territory and fathered Hán Ying (韓嬰).
- Hán Tuidang (韓頹當), a younger son who was born in Tuidang in Xiongnu territory.

Both Hán Tuidang and Hán Ying returned to the Hàn Empire during the reign of Emperor Wen.

There were other more distant descendants of Hán Xin as follows:

- Hán Leng (韓棱), an official of the early Eastern Han dynasty, was recorded as a descendant through Hán Tuidang.
- Hán Ji (韓曁), an official of the late Eastern Han dynasty and Cao Wei state, was recorded as a descendant.
  - Hán Mi (韓謐), a great-great-grandson of Han Ji, was designated as the heir of the Western Jin dynasty official Jia Chong, his maternal grandfather. Drawn into the turmoil that is the War of the Eight Princes (specifically, the struggle between his maternal aunt Empress Jia Nanfeng and Sima Lun Prince of Zhao), he was executed in 300 along with his immediate and extended family – both Hán and Jia clan members.
- Hán Yu (韓愈), the Tang dynasty literary figure recognised for his role in Classical Prose Movement, also traced his ancestry to Hán Tuidang.

Chinese royalty
Preceded by Zheng Chang	King of Hán; 205 BC – 196 BC	Unknown
