= Li Guang =

Chinese military general of the Western Han dynasty

- 李廣
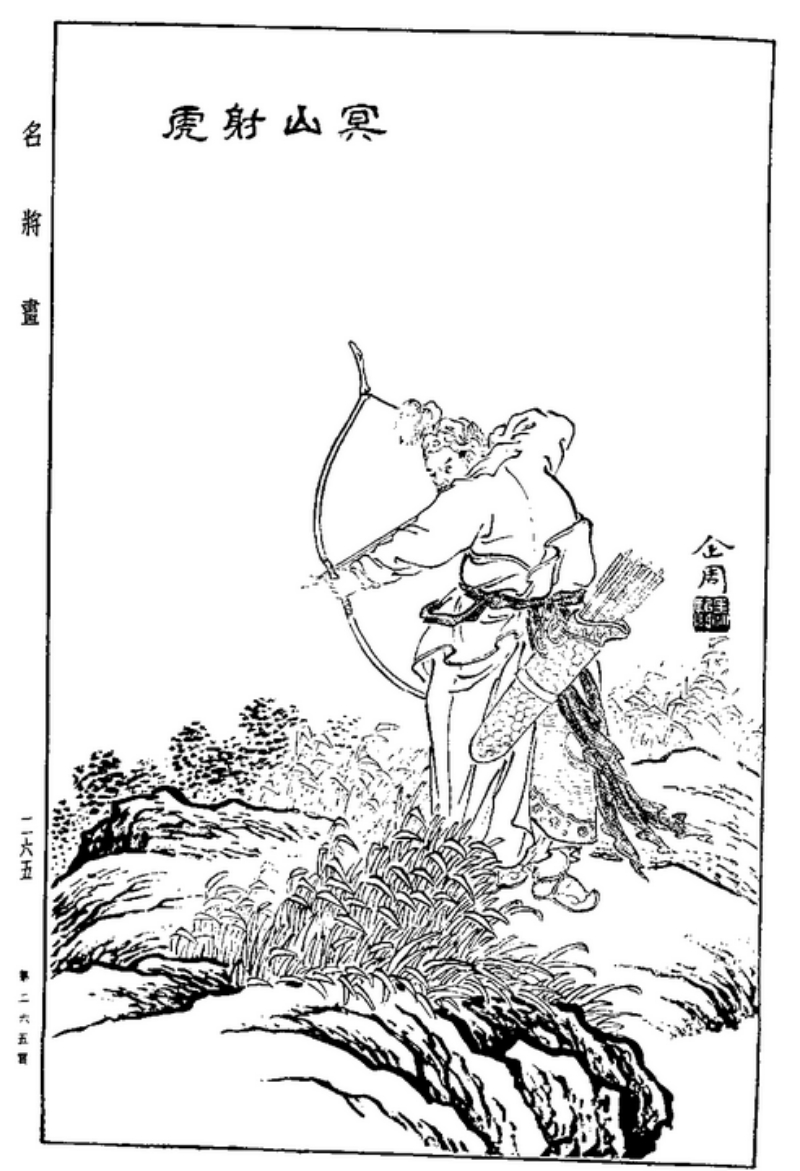
- Born: c. 184 BC; Chengji, Longxi Commandery, Western Han (modern day Tianshui, Gansu)
- Died: 119 BC (aged 64–65)
- Cause of death: Suicide
- Children: Li Danghu; Li Jiao; Li Gan
- Relatives: Li Xin (5th-generation ancestor); Li Ling (grandson)
- Military career
- Allegiance: Han
- Service years: 166–119 BC
- Rank: General
- Nickname: Flying General (飛將軍)
- Conflicts: Rebellion of the Seven Kingdoms; Han–Xiongnu Wars; Battle of Mayi; Battle of Mobei

Li Guang (184–119 BCE (Note: 4th year of the Yuan'shou era of Emperor Wu's reign. The year corresponds to 12 Nov 120 BCE to 1 Nov 119 BCE in the proleptic Julian calendar. Li Guang's biographies in Shiji and Han Shu did not record his exact age when he died, only that he was in his 60s (六十馀).)) was a Chinese military general of the Western Han dynasty. Nicknamed the "Flying General" by the Xiongnu, he fought primarily in the campaigns against the nomadic Xiongnu tribes to the north of the Western Han. He was known to the Xiongnu as a tough opponent when it came to fortress defense, and his presence was sometimes enough for the Xiongnu to abort a siege.

Li Guang committed suicide shortly after the Battle of Mobei in 119 BC. He was blamed for failing to arrive at the battlefield in time (after getting lost in the desert), creating a gap in the encirclement and allowing the Xiongnu chanyu Yizhixie to escape after a confrontation between Wei Qing and Yizhixie's main force, which the Han army narrowly managed to defeat. Refusing to accept the humiliation of a court martial, Li Guang killed himself.

Li Guang belonged to the Longxi branch of the Li clan (隴西李氏). Li Guang was a descendant of Laozi and the Qin general Li Xin, as well as an ancestor of the Western Liang dynasty and Tang dynasty monarchs. Li Guang was the grandfather of the Western Han general Li Ling who defected to the Xiongnu.

== Biography ==
In 166 BC (the fourteenth year of Emperor Wen of Han), Xiongnu launched a large-scale invasion of Xiaoguan. Li Guang joined the army to fight against Xiongnu. Because he was skilled in horsemanship and archery, he killed many Xiongnu leaders. Li Guang also had accompanied the emperor on several hunts and personally killed wild beasts. Emperor Wen of Han impressed with him and E claimed that if Li Guang born during the time of Liu Bang, he would reach high position without much difficulty.

Li Guang further distinguished himself during the Rebellion of the Seven Kingdoms, where he served under the Grand General Zhou Yafu. However, Emperor Jing was unhappy that he had accepted a seal given by Liu Wu, Prince of Liang, Emperor Jing's brother; Emperor Jing had been wary of the Prince of Liang, as Liu Wu had ambitions to place himself as Emperor Jing's successor, over Emperor Jing's sons. This stance was also supported by Empress Dowager Dou, their mother. Thus, Li did not get promoted to a marquisate despite his anti-rebellion achievement.

As the border of Hebei was always subject to constant attacks by the Xiongnu, Li Guang's valorous temper was deemed a good fit, and he was assigned to defend against them.

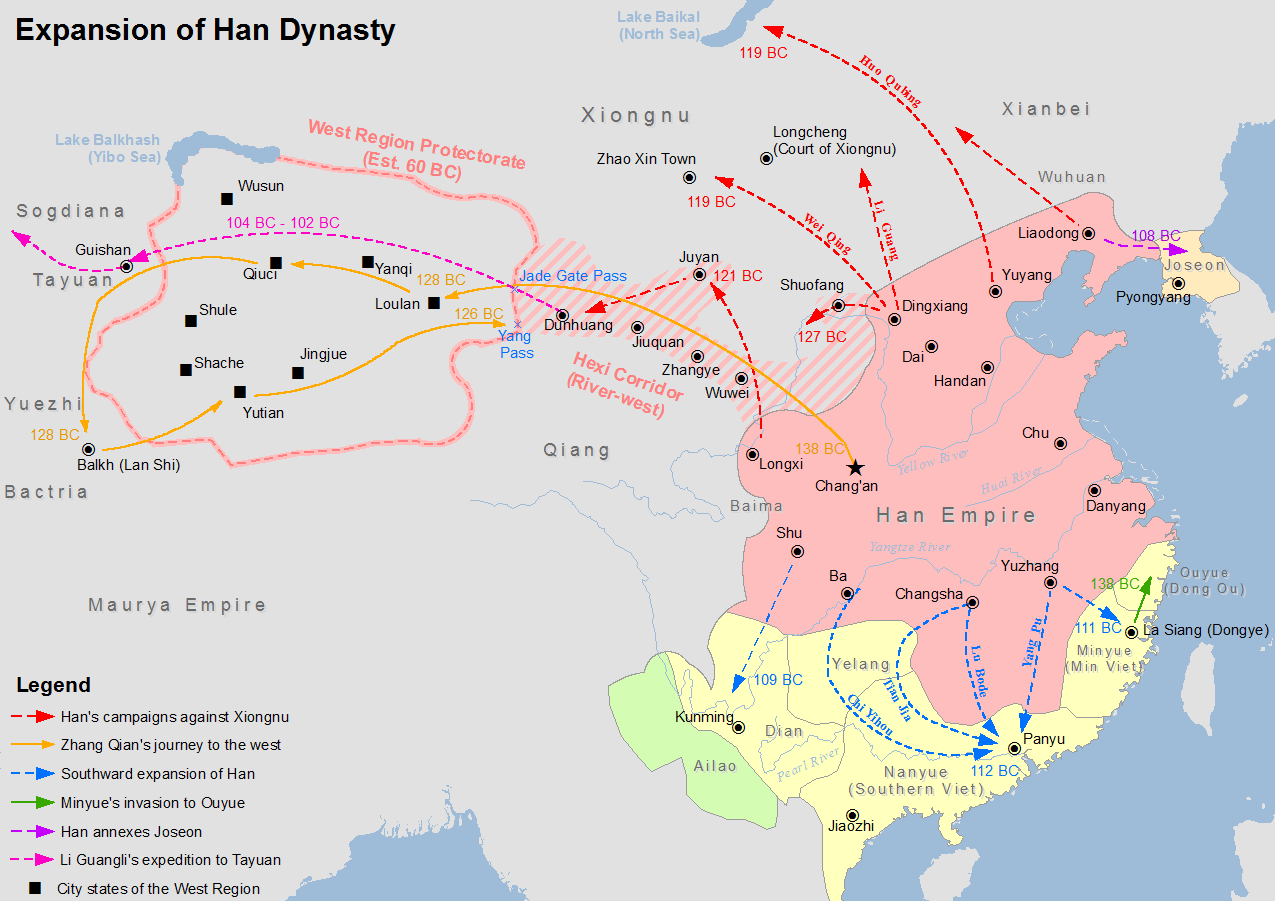
Expansion of the Han dynasty; Li Guang's campaign against Xiongnu is shown in red

In 129 BC, Li Guang escaped from captivity after his army was annihilated during an offensive campaign at Yanmen. Wounded, Li Guang being carried on a litter to the Xiongnu chieftain, who had given orders to take him alive. On their way, Li Guang saw a young boy riding a fine horse nearby. Despite his injury, Li Guang jumped up onto the horse and, taking the boy with him as hostage and gallop south. Pursued by the enemy soldiers, he used the boy's bow and arrows to ward off the pursuers, eventually rejoining his troops. Due to this accident, Li Guang was stripped of official titles and demoted to commoner status with fellow defeated general Gongsun Ao (公孫敖) after paying parole.

In 120 BC, Li Guang commanded 4,000 supporting cavalry in combat against a large Xiongnu army by entering the enemy territory. However, after several hundred miles of march, his column was ambushed by more than 40,000 Xiongnu cavalry, after chasing a handful of Xiongnu horsemen, who feigned retreat to lure Li Guang troops into an ambush. Li Guang, who was familiar with such tactics ordered his son Li Gan to charge directly at the enemy with only 20-30 horsemen. As the Xiongnu column retreat in response of the charge to bait him into chasing them, Li gan immediately turned and rode back to his father. Li Guang intentionally tells his troops that the Xiongnu were cowards and cannot fight to calm his men.As now the Xiongnu realize their feigned retreat failed to goad Li Gan, now they regroup Ina preparation for General attack. Li Guang already anticipates this development and used the delay to move his formation into better defensive positions. He ordered his cavalry to dismount from their horses and forming a circular formation to withstand the enemy force almost ten times their number while prepared their bows and crossbows. According to Sima Qian, "the Xiongnu charged furiously down on the soldiers and their arrows fell like rain. Over half the Han soldiers were killed and the arrows of the remaining troops were almost entirely gone." Amidst the Xiongnu encirclement, Li Guang ordered a his soldiers to stop shooting. As the Xiongnu saw the Han archers stopped firing, their commanders stepped forward exposin themselves. Li Guang then personally shooting the enemy sub commander and several other captains that exposinf themselves. The Xiongnu retreated ask they seek their leaders either dead or injured by Li Guang. Later at night, as the Han soldiers began to despetate, Li Guang stay calm while instructing his troops to form certain battle formations. On the third day, a Han reinforcement detschment from the main Han army arrived at Li Guang's position, causing the Xiongnu to withdrawn completely from the battlefield. Despite suffering huge losses, Li Guang operation was deemed success due to massive casualties inflicted upon the Xiongnu. The rules of the Han army dictated a commander's achievement was measured only according to his number of enemy kills minus the casualties of his own side.

During the Battle of Mobei in 119 BC, an old but still enthusiastic Li Guang insisted Emperor Wu to promise him a vanguard position, but the emperor had secretly messaged generalissimo Wei Qing to not let Li lead the vanguard due to his infamy of "bad fortune". Wei Qing then assigned Li Guang to combine forces with Zhao Shiqi (赵食其/趙食其) on an eastern flanking route through a barren plain. Li Guang protested against the arrangement and angrily stormed out of the main camp. However, he and Zhao then got lost and missed the battle entirely, and only rejoining the main force after Wei Qing returned from a hard-fought victory against Yizhixie Chanyu's numerically superior army. As a result, Li and Zhao were summoned to a court martial to explain why they failed to accomplish orders and put the battle strategy at risk. Li Guang, frustrated and humiliated as this was his last chance to obtain sufficient merits to receive a marquessate as a reward, committed honor suicide. His son Li Gan blamed Wei Qing for his father's death, assaulted Wei and was later shot dead for the offence by his own superior Huo Qubing (who was Wei's nephew) during a hunting trip.

== Character evaluation ==
According to Sima Qian's Records of the Grand Historian, Li Guang was a man of great build, with long arms and good archery skills, able to shoot an arrow deeply into a stone (which resembles the shape of a crouching tiger) on one occasion. In the Imperial Japanese gunka Teki wa Ikuman, the song's lyrics reference Li Guang's ability to pierce a stone with an arrow as an example of determination regardless of difficulty. According to the "Treatise on Arts and Letters," a work titled General Li's Art of Archery (Li Jiangjun Shefa) was authored by Li Guang.

Similar to his contemporaries Wei Qing and Huo Qubing, he was a caring and well-respected general who earned the respect of his soldiers. He also earned the favor of Emperor Wen, who said of him: "If he had been born in the time of Emperor Gaozu, he would have been given a fief of ten thousand households (Chinese:万户侯) without any difficulty".

However, Li Guang's late military career was constantly haunted by repeated incidents of what would be regarded as jinxed with "bad luck" by later scholars. He had a nasty tendency of losing direction during mobilisations; in field battles, he was often outnumbered and surrounded by superior enemies. While Li Guang's fame attracted much of his enemies' attention, Li Guang's troops relative lack of discipline and his lack of strategic planning often put him and his regiments in awkward situations. These, together with Li Guang's political naivety (as shown in the Prince of Liang incident), denied him of any chance of promotion to a marquisate, his lifelong dream. Emperor Wu even secretly ordered Wei Qing not to assign Li Guang to important missions (such as the vanguard position), on the grounds of Li Guang's famed "terrible fortune". According to Sima Qian's record, one day Li Guang seeking consultation with Wang Shuo, an astrologer and physiognomist, about why his career was unfortunate and never being able to achieve marquis rank. Wang Shuo pointed out that it is due to Li Guang's past sin of massacring the surrendered 800 enemy Qiang people soldiers in the past.

Huang Chunyao , a scholar and officla of the later era of Ming dynasty gave his assessment that Li Guang was not actually outstanding general. He criticized the lack or discipline and strategy of Li Guang's leadership which makes him find troubles when facing strong enemy.Although Chunyao praised the personal bravery of Li Guang when he single handedly killing many Xiongnu comanders with his archery while being surrounded by much larger enemies, he pointed out how Sima Qian's personal admiration bias towards Li Guang has influenced the former's flawed assessment who rated Li Guang above Wei Qing, who Chunyao himself rated as superior general than Li Guang.

Li Guang is mentioned by his nickname in Wang Changling's seven-character quatrain "On the Frontier" (出塞). Wang comments on how war has been taking its toll on the troops stationed at the frontier, particularly given the lack of a brilliant and charismatic military commander like Li Guang.
