= Battle of Baideng =

Xiongnu Empire-China Empire battle

- Part of Han–Xiongnu Wars
Date	200 BC
Location	Mount Baideng near Pingcheng (present-day Datong, Shanxi)
Result	See aftermath

Belligerents
Xiongnu	Han dynasty

Commanders and leaders
Modu Chanyu	Emperor Gaozu of Han

Strength
20,000–40,000 or 300,000–400,000	320,000 (Only a portion reached Mt. Baideng.)

In 200 BC, a Han dynasty vanguard was encircled at Mount Baideng (Chinese: t 白登之圍, s 白登之围, Báidēng zhī zhàn) near present-day Datong, Shanxi, by the Xiongnu amid a series of border clashes.

== Background ==
After the fall of Qin dynasty, Han emperor Liu Bang was still consolidating his territories against potential rivals. Considering the original fief of Xin of Han to be too strategically close to Zhongyuan, Liu ordered Xin to relocate north to defend the border against the Xiongnu. Xin later requested to be transferred farther to Mayi (present-day Zhuozhou). After being defeated by Xiongnu leader Modu Chanyu, however, he defected and combined forces with Modu to capture Jinyang (part of Taiyuan today).

== Battle ==
Liu Bang's army was able to recapture Taiyuan and nearby places, forcing Xin and the Xiongnu to withdraw. His envoys reported that enemy soldiers were weak. Han forces, numbering 320,000 and mostly infantry, prepared to press their attack. Advisor Lou Jing pointed out that showing weakness did not make sense and could be a Xiongnu ruse. By then troops had already been ordered to march out however. Liu Bang became upset at Lou Jing and detained him.

When Liu and his vanguard reached Pingcheng (present-day Datong), they became surrounded by Xiongnu calvary on Mount Baideng and cut off from the rest of the Han army. The Book of Han indicated that Xiongnu forces numbered over 300,000, while Lev Gumilev argues that it probably numbered from 20,000 to 40,000 based on the total population of the nomads and the limited amount of pasture available during the encirclement. The two sides were locked in a stalement for seven days, and Liu could not replenish his food supply. Chen Ping, one of his advisors, sent an envoy to persuade Modu Chanyu's wife that, according to a later conjecture by Huan Tan, if Modu wins he might take Han concubines. The exact conversation is unknown, but she ended up telling Modu that the two regents should not give each other a hard time and that taking Han territory does not mean he could live there. Meanwhile, Modu had been waiting to combine forces with two of Xin's generals, but they did not show up. Fearing that they might have defected to Liu and that Han foot soldiers were about to arrive, Modu opened a corner of the blockade to let Liu's forces escape.

== Aftermath ==
After escaping, Liu Bang executed the envoys who had underestimated the Xiongnu and released Lou Jing before promoting him. Because the Xiongnu continued to raid border areas, Liu Bang ultimately followed Lou Jing's advice to marry Liu's daughter, later changed to another member of the royal clan, to Modu Chanyu, beginning the heqin policy. Government horse pastures were established in northern Han provinces to create a stronger cavalry force.

== See also ==
- Han–Xiongnu Wars
- Xiongnu invasion of Donghu

== Bibliography ==
- Xinlun: On strategems (in Chinese).
- Shiji, Volume 56: Biography of Chen Ping (in Chinese).
- Book of Han, Volume 43: Biography of Lou Jing (in Chinese).
- Book of Han, Volume 94(I): Biography of Modu Chanyu (in Chinese).
- Chang Chun-shu (2007), The Rise of the Chinese Empire, Vol. I: Nation, State, and Imperialism in Early China, ca. 1600 B.C. – A.D. 8, Ann Arbor: University of Michigan Press.
- Grousset, René (1970), The Empire of the Steppes: A History of Central Asia.
