= Laoshang =

Jiyu
- Laoshang Chanyu

Chanyu of the Xiongnu Empire
- Reign: 174–161 BCE
- Predecessor: Modu Chanyu
- Successor: Junchen Chanyu
- Born: Modern-day Mongolia
- Died: 161 BCE
- Father: Modu Chanyu

Laoshang (Chinese: 老上; r. 174–161 BCE), whose personal name was Jiyu (Chinese: 稽鬻), was a chanyu of the Xiongnu Empire who succeeded his father Modu Chanyu in 174 BCE. Under his reign, the Xiongnu Empire continued to expand against the Yuezhi with the Xiongnu gaining control of the Hexi Corridor.

== Name ==
Laoshang in Chinese means "old and elevated', and is probably a translation from a Xiongnu title, but might represent an attempt to phonetically represent a Xiongnu word.

== Life ==
In 177 or 176 BCE, following direction from his father Modu, Jiyu put an end to the danger of the Yuezhi, made their king's skull into a drinking cup, and chased them from Gansu. Subsequently the Yuezhi migrated west.

Modu died In 174 BCE and Jiyu became Laoshang Chanyu.

The Shiji chapter 110 says:

"Shortly after this, Maodun died and his son Jizhu was set up with the title of Old Shanyu. When Jizhu became Shanyu [in 174 BCE], Emperor Wen sent a princess of the imperial family to be his consort, dispatching a eunuch from Yan named Zhonghang Yue to accompany her as her tutor.

In 166 BCE, Xiongnu forces under Laoshang raided within sight of Chang'an and carried off a large number of people and animals.

In 165 BCE, the Xiongnu returned and again raided within sight of Chang'an.

In 164 BCE, the Xiongnu under Laoshang overran Gansu and the Tarim Basin completely, driving out the Yuezhi and Sakas, who invaded Bactria and occupied Sogdia. The Yuezhi would be pushed out by the Wusun, forcing them further into Sogdia and driving out the Sakas. The Sakas went to Parthia and some to India. A group known as the Lesser Yuezhi fled into southern Gansu and merged with the Qiang population. Laoshang also defeated a group of people in northern Bactria known as the Hathal and turned their chief's skull into a drinking cup. From this western position the Xiongnu conducted yearly raids on the Han.

In 161 BCE, Laoshang died and was succeeded by his son, Junchen Chanyu.

== Footnotes ==
Preceded by Modu Chanyu	Chanyu of the Xiongnu Empire; 174–161 BCE	Succeeded by Junchen Chanyu
