= Battle of Mobei =

Battle in 119 BC

- Part of the Han–Xiongnu War
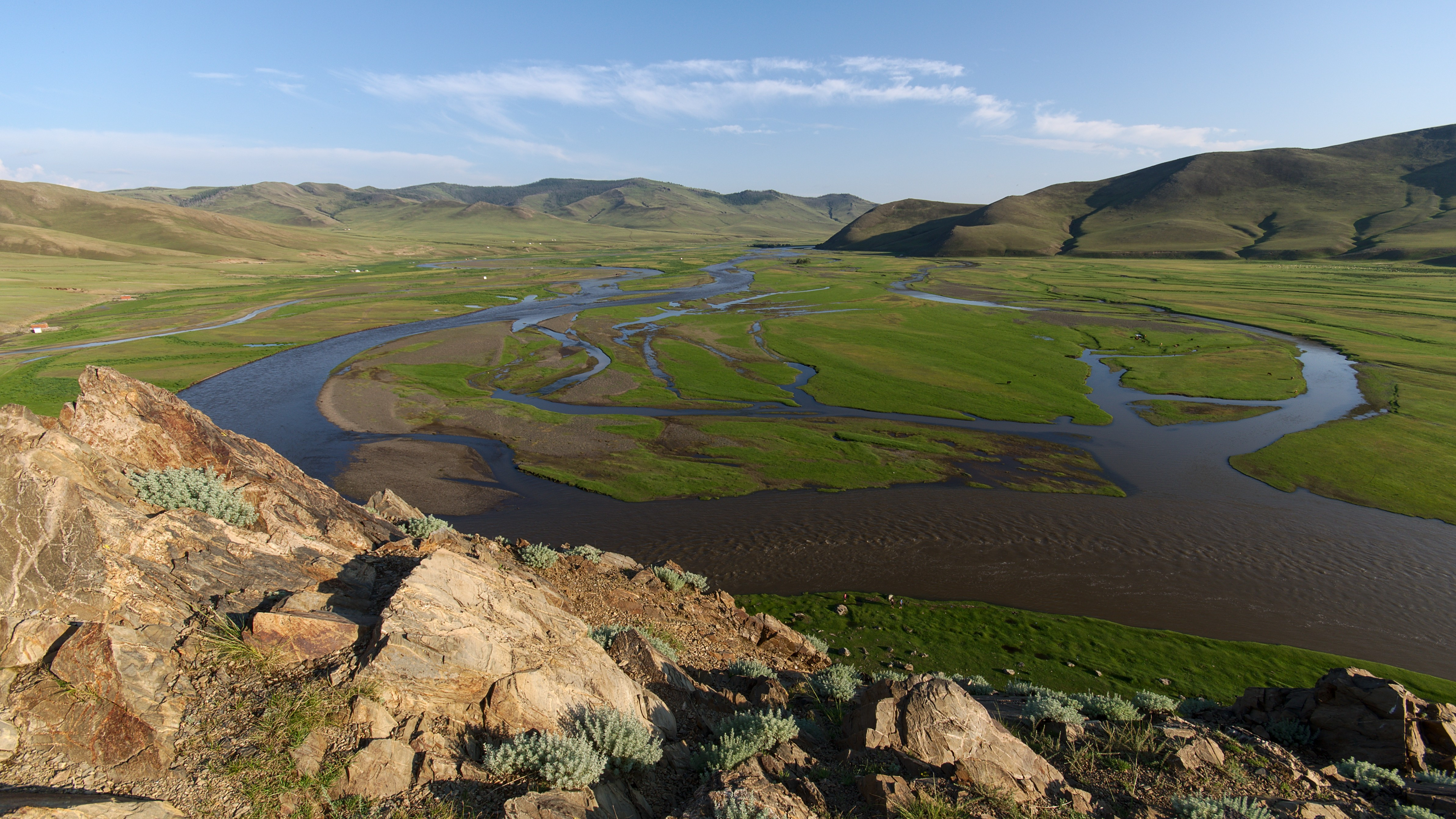
- Upstream of Orkhon River in Övörkhangai Province, where the battle took place
Date	January– June 119 BC
Location	Orkhon Valley, modern-day Mongolia
Result	Han victory

Belligerents
Xiongnu	Han dynasty

Commanders and leaders
Yizhixie Chanyu; Worthy Prince of the East; Zhao Xin	Wei Qing; Huo Qubing; Cao Xiang (曹襄); Li Guang †; Gongsun He (公孫賀); Lu Bode

Strength
300,000 of cavalries and troops	100,000 troops and 140,000 horses (divided between the eastern theater generals and the western theater generals)

Casualties and losses
19,000 killed or captured in the western theater, and over 70,000+ killed or captured in the eastern theater	20% of the eastern theater, 80% of their horses on these expeditions

The Battle of Mobei (simplified Chinese: 漠北之战; traditional Chinese: 漠北之戰; pinyin: Mòběi zhī Zhàn) was a military campaign fought mainly in modern-day Mongolia, in the extreme cold and barren lands of the Gobi Desert. It was part of a major strategic offensive launched by the Han dynasty in the winter of January 119 BC, into the heartland of the nomadic Xiongnu. The campaign was a success for the Han, whose forces led by Wei Qing and Huo Qubing reached as far north as Lake Baikal.

== Background ==
Military tension had for a long time existed between ancient China and various steppe nomad tribes known collectively as Beidi ("northern barbarian"), mainly because the fertile lands of the prosperous agricultural civilization presented attractive looting targets for the militaristic nomads. Throughout ancient Chinese history, protecting the northern borders from nomadic raids was a military priority. During the Zhou dynasty, northern vassal states such as Yan, Zhao and Qin resorted to defensive strategies, constructing elongated fortresses that served as the precursors of the Great Wall of China. During the Qin dynasty, Qin Shi Huang, the first unified emperor of China, conscripted thousands of civilian labourers to perfect the Great Wall in order to reinforce military campaigns along the northern border.

The Xiongnu were initially a loose confederacy of horseback tribes from the Mongolian Plateau, who was previously kept in check by the border campaigns of Zhao general Li Mu in 265 BC and later by the expeditionary offensives under Qin dynasty general Meng Tian in 215 BC. With the collapse of the Qin dynasty in 206 BC and the subsequent Chu–Han Contention, the Xiongnu gained the opportunity to become unified under Modu Chanyu and quickly expanded into a powerful nomadic empire that ruled over a vast territory across Inner Asia. The Xiongnu then re-invaded and occupied the fertile Hetao region, using it as staging area for raids into the Guanzhong and Fen River valleys, both important Chinese heartlands. When the Chu–Han Contention concluded in 202 BC, Emperor Gao of the newly founded Han dynasty recognized the threat posed by the hostile northern neighbour and launched a massive campaign in 200 BC. After the Emperor Gao's personal division was lured away from the Han main army into an ambush and encircled by 300,000 elite Xiongnu cavalry for seven days, the siege was relieved only after messengers were sent to bribe the Chanyu's wife. Following this failure, the Han emperor realized that the nation – which was still recovering from a massive civil war – was not yet strong enough to confront the Xiongnu; therefore, he resorted to the so-called "marriage alliance", or heqin, which was diplomatic appeasement with periodic tributes and women (presented as princesses) sent to the Xiongnu to symbolize a marriage of states in order to ease hostility and buy time to strengthen the nation. Despite the humiliating heqin, the Han borders were still frequently raided by Xiongnu forces over the next seven decades, with some incursions so bold that smoke signals could be seen from the Ganquan Palace during the reign of Emperor Wen, the fifth emperor of the Han dynasty.

The seventh Han emperor, Emperor Wu, was a subscriber of more proactive confucian doctrines, as opposed to the more passive and libertarian Taoist wu wei principles previously held esteemed by his forebears. Early into his reign, Emperor Wu decided that the Chinese nation, which prospered economically under the Rule of Wen and Jing, was finally strong enough to decisively solve the Xiongnu problem. The de jure "peace" between Han and Xiongnu was broken in 133 BC after a large ambush operation was staged at Mayi (modern day Shuozhou, Shanxi) but aborted after the Xiongnu discovered the trap and retreated. In 129 BC, the Han forces had their first proper victory against the Xiongnu under the command of a young Wei Qing, with a long-distance raid on the Xiongnu holy site at Longcheng. Over the next ten years, Emperor Wu repeatedly deployed Wei and his nephew Huo Qubing against Xiongnu forces, recapturing large areas of lands from the Hetao and Hexi regions and dealing devastating blows to both manpower, economics and territorial control of the Xiongnu empire. Emperor Wu also dispatched diplomatic and trading envoys into the Western Regions, gradually swaying the allegiance of the Tocharian and Greco-Bactrian city-states and thus eroding the sphere of influence of the Xiongnu in Central Asia.

Evicted by military defeats, Xiongnu's Yizhixie Chanyu took Zhao Xin's advice and retreated the Xiongnu tribes to the north of the Gobi Desert, hoping that the barren land would serve as a natural barrier against Han offensives. In early 119 BC, Emperor Wu planned a massive expeditionary campaign to strike the Xiongnu across the desert. Han forces were deployed in two columns, each consisting of 50,000 cavalrymen and in total supported by over 140,000 infantrymen/auxiliaries. Wei Qing and Huo Qubing served as the supreme commander of each column, and set off from Dai Prefecture and Dingxiang, respectively.

The initial plan called for Huo Qubing to attack the western route from Dingxiang, but misinformation from a Xiongnu prisoner of war reported that the Chanyu's main force was deployed to the east at Dai Prefecture. Emperor Wu, who had been distancing Wei Qing and giving the younger Huo more attention and favour, ordered the two columns to switch routes in the hope of letting Huo (who was preferentially assigned the most elite troopers) engage the Chanyu's main force.

== Battles ==
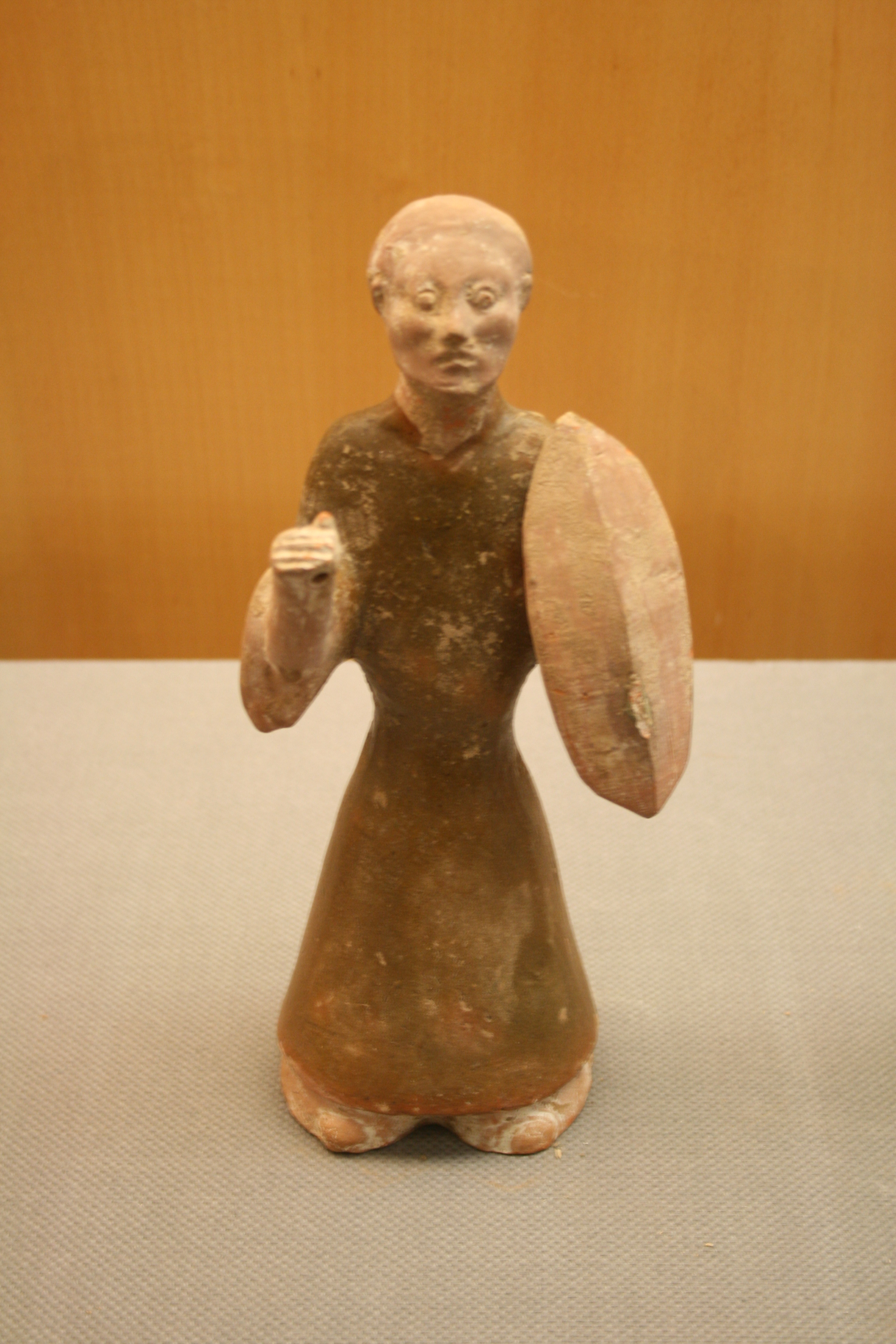
Shieldbearer, Han dynasty

=== Eastern (Dai Prefecture) theatre ===
The eastern theatre was quite straightforward, as the Han forces deployed were superior to the opposing Xiongnu forces.

Huo Qubing's forces set off from Dai Prefecture, marched over 1,000 miles and directly engaged the forces of the Xiongnu's Worthy Prince of the East. The battle was swift and decisive, as the Worthy Prince's forces were no match for Huo's elite cavalry. The Huo's army quickly encircled and overran their enemy, killing 70,443 men and capturing three Xiongnu lords and 83 nobles. Huo Qubing's forces suffered a 20% casualty rate but were quickly resupplied locally from their capture. He then went on to conduct a series of rituals upon arrival at the Khentii Mountains (called Langjuxu Mountains then) in order to symbolize the historic Han victory, then continued his pursuit as far as Lake Baikal, effectively annihilating the Xiongnu clan.

A separate division led by Lu Bode, set off on a strategically flanking route from Right Beiping, joined forces with Huo after arriving in time with 2,800 enemy kills. The combined forces then returned in triumph.

=== Western (Dingxiang) theatre ===
The western theatre, although setting off with fewer expectations from Emperor Wu, proved more dramatic. Wei Qing's force, set off from Dingxiang, and were comparatively weaker than their eastern counterpart, as its force consisted mainly of leftovers from Huo Qubing's preferential picks for the east. Wei Qing also had other liabilities — he had five generals under his command that expected prestigious assignments, including an old but enthusiastic Li Guang. Li Guang insisted that he wanted a vanguard position as promised by Emperor Wu, but the emperor had secretly messaged Wei to refuse based on the superstition surrounding Li as jinxed with "bad fortune". Wei Qing then assigned Li Guang to combine forces with Zhao Shiqi on a barren eastern flanking route, an arrangement that Li protested against and led to him angrily storming out of the main camp.

The Han army mobilized as planned. After a journey of over 800 km (500 mi), they encountered the Chanyu's main forces of 80,000 cavalry waiting at the end of the desert. This was unexpected, as the original strategy was to let Huo Qubing's elite troops deal with the Chanyu's elite cavalry (the reason the two Han columns switched routes). The Xiongnu forces were well rested and had been anticipating their adversary to be vulnerable to an ambush after traversing the desert; the Han forces, on the other hand, were indeed fatigued and outnumbered, especially since the Li Guang and Zhao Shiqi's eastern division had not yet arrived on the battlefield. Without hesitation, the Xiongnu charged the Han forces with a 10,000-strong cavalry vanguard.

Wei Qing, however, immediately recognized the odds against him and quickly took defensive countermeasures. He ordered his troops to arrange heavy-armoured war wagons known as "Wu Gang Chariots" (武刚车/武剛車) into ring-like formations, creating mobile fortresses that provided archers, crossbowmen and infantry protection from the Xiongnu's formidable cavalry charges, and allowed Han troops to utilize their ranged weapons' advantage of precision over the Xiongnu horse archers. A 5,000-strong force of cavalry was deployed to reinforce the formations and eradicate any Xiongnu forces that managed to infiltrate past the defensive lines. This tactic proved effective in countering the momentum of the nomadic cavalry, as the Xiongnu forces were unable to breach the Han army's defense. With the Xiongnu's initial energy neutralized, the battle solidified into a stalemate with neither side making significant gains or losses.

This stalemate lasted until dusk, when a sandstorm obscured the battlefield. Wei Qing seized the tactical opportunity and sent in his main cavalry, who had been sitting in reserve to recover stamina since the battle began. The Han shock cavalry used the low visibility of the sandstorm as cover and encircled the Chanyu's army from both flanks. The Xiongnu's lines were overwhelmed, and their morale broken by the sight of Han soldiers suddenly attacking them in the darkness. Seeing that his forces were completely overrun, the Chanyu escaped under the escort of only a few hundred men. The Han forces killed over 19,000 enemies on the field and pursued the remainder another 160 km (100 mi) to the Khangai Mountains, where they besieged and captured the Fortress of Zhao Xin in the Orkhon Valley. After a day spent regrouping and receiving fresh supplies, the Han forces razed the stronghold (which served as the main supply depot of Chanyu's core army) to the ground, before returning in triumph.

The flanking eastern division, commanded by Li Guang and Zhao Shiqi, got lost in the desert and missed the battle entirely, only rejoining the main force on Wei Qing's way home. As a result, Li and Zhao were summoned to a court martial for failing to accomplish orders and putting the battle strategy at risk. Li Guang, frustrated and humiliated as this was his last chance to obtain sufficient battle distinctions to receive a marquessate as a reward, committed suicide to preserve his honour.

The battles of the western theatre proved more strategically decisive. The Chanyu's main forces was so badly defeated that the Chanyu disappeared for over 10 days, resulting in his confederacy presuming he was dead and installing a new leader who had to be forcefully removed after he finally reappeared, further fragmenting the Xiongnu's political unity. The Xiongnu were then forced to retreat further north into the colder regions of Siberia, with their immediate threat to the Han dynasty's northern border largely obliterated.

== Aftermath ==
The costs of the victorious campaigns over the Xiongnu in the ten years from 129 to 119 BC were enormous: the Han army lost almost 80% of their horses on these expeditions, due to combat as well as non-combative losses such as the harsh journey and plague caused by the Xiongnu contaminating the water supply with dead cattle.

Economic pressure on the central Han government led to new taxes being introduced, increasing the burden on average peasants. The registered population of the Han Empire dropped significantly as a result of famine and excessive taxing to fund military mobilisations.

The Xiongnu, however, suffered an even more lethal blow, as their military losses would reflect directly on their economy. Apart from loss of manpower due to wartime casualties and diseases, the nomadic Xiongnu lost millions of livestock, their vital food resource, to the Han army, and the war caused large proportion of the remaining cattle to suffer miscarriages during their reproductive seasons.

Furthermore, the loss of control over the fertile southern grassland meant that Xiongnu had to hole up in the cold, barren land of the northern Gobi Desert and Siberia, struggling to survive despite the harsh weather and conditions. As a result, there was a true truce between the Han dynasty and Xiongnu for seven years, which ended after a Xiongnu raid in 112 BC at Wuyuan. The Xiongnu, however, never recovered to the strength of their past glory days, and would break apart into smaller clans in the coming decades, ultimately splitting into northern and southern branches a century later, as the southern branches become the subordinates of the Han dynasty. With the northern branches being under attack from the southern branches, the Han empire and other Nomadic tribes such as the Wuhuan and Xianbei, gain independence from the Xiongnu overlords, forcing the northern branches to immigrate westward. Eventually, the fleeing northern branches of Xiongnu became the ancestors of the Huns, which would cause the indirect destruction of the Western Roman Empire in the following centuries. While others migrated south of central Asia becoming the Xionites, Kidarites, Hephthalites and Nezak Huns, indirectly causing the collapse of the Gupta Empire, and becoming a major burden to the Sassanid Empire.
