= Jin Midi =

Xiongnu-Chinese politician (134–86 BCE)

- 金日磾

Personal details
- Born: 134 BC Xiutu Kingdom
- Died: 29 September 86 BC Western Han dynasty
- Resting place: Maoling
- Children: 3
- Parent: Xiutu (father)
- Occupation: General, politician

Jin Midi (Chinese: 金日磾; pinyin: Jīn Mìdī; 134 BC – 29 September 86 BC), courtesy name Wengshu (翁叔), formally Marquess Jing of Du (秺敬侯), was a Xiongnu-Chinese politician of the Western Han dynasty.

Because he was originally a Xiongnu Xiutu prince, he was referred to as a non-Han "barbarian", either with the term Hu or Yidi. He was originally from the Xiutu Kingdom in central Gansu and served as co-regent early in the reign of the Emperor Zhao of Han. He was given the family name "Jin" ("Gold") by Emperor Wu of Han because he worshipped the golden statue of the Xiongnu which Huo Qubing captured in his military campaigns.

== Background ==
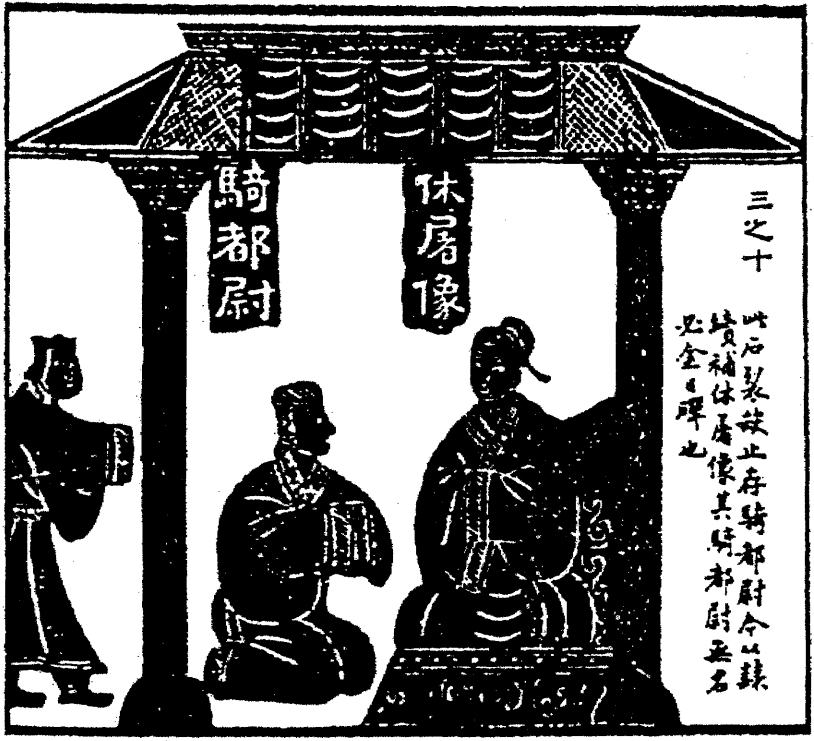
Jin Midi (kneeling) with his mother (seated). Wu Liang shrine, Jiaxiang, Shandong province, China. 2nd century AD. Ink rubbings of stone-carved reliefs as represented in Feng Yunpeng and Feng Yunyuan, Jinshi suo (金石索, 1821 edition).

Jin Midi was born in 134 BC to a royal Xiongnu family. He was the heir of the Xiongnu's Prince of Xiutu, one of the major princes under the supreme ruler of the Xiongnu, the Junchen Chanyu. After Junchen's death in 126 BC, his brother Yizhixie succeeded him. During this time, the Prince of Xiutu and another major prince, the Prince of Hunye, were responsible for defending Xiongnu's southwestern border with Han dynasty in modern central and western Gansu.

In 121 BC, Emperor Wu of Han sent his general Huo Qubing to attack the Xiongnu, dealing a great defeat to the Xiongnu. In the campaign, Huo killed the Princes of Zhelan and Luhu, as well as 8,900 Xiongnu soldiers, while capturing the Prince of Hunye's son, chief assistant, and a number of officials, as well as golden statues that the Prince of Xiutu had forged to use to worship heaven. Yizhixie Chanyu was greatly displeased, and was considering summoning the Princes of Hunye and Xiutu to execute them. The princes, in fear, plotted to defect to Han. When Emperor Wu sent Huo to accept their surrender, the Prince of Xiutu changed his mind and tried to back out of defecting. The Prince of Hunye killed him and surrendered to Han, along with the region that he controlled.

Because the Prince of Xiutu was killed, Midi, as well as his mother the princess, as well as his brother Lun, were confiscated to serve as imperial servants. Midi was assigned to the imperial stables.

== During Emperor Wu's reign ==
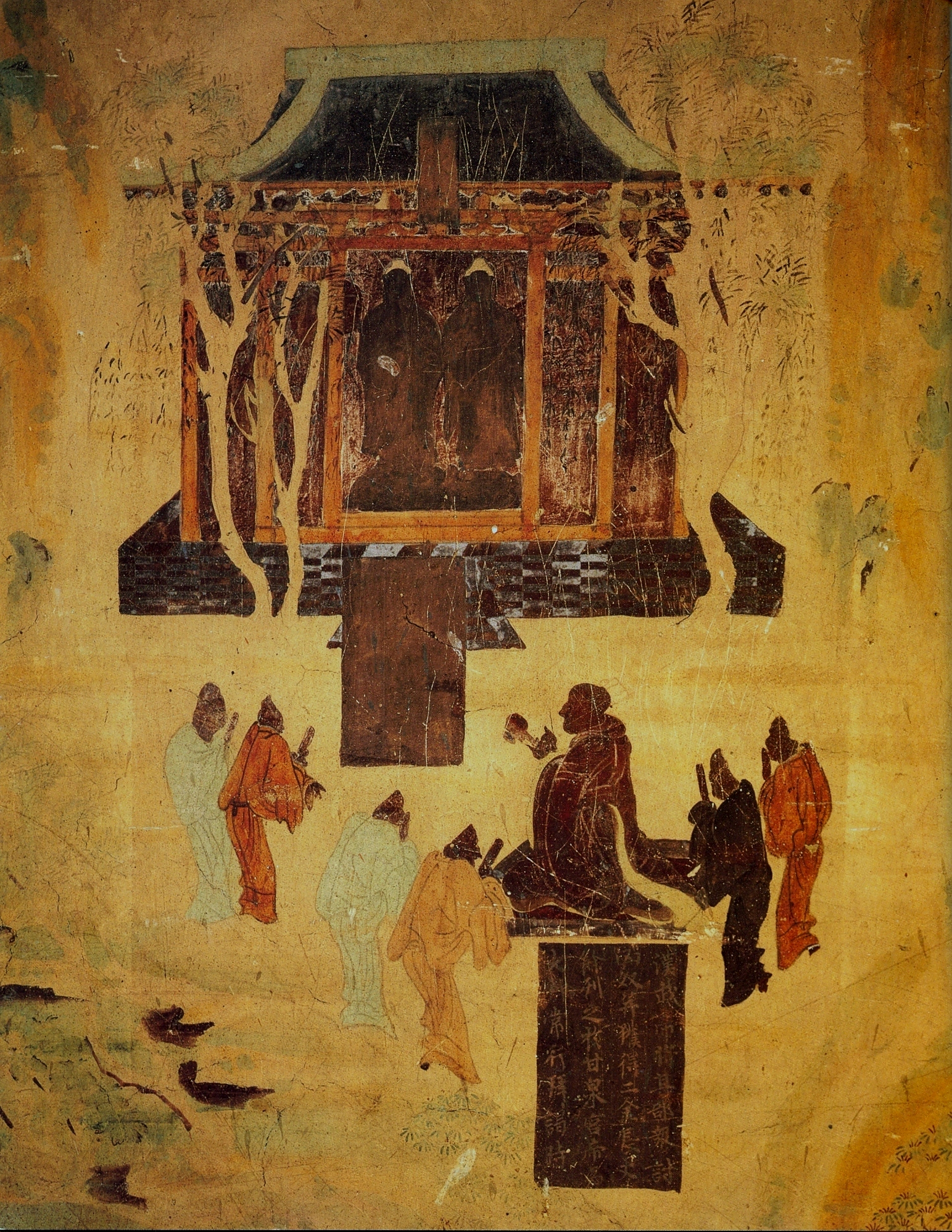
8th century fresco at Mogao Caves depicting the Han Emperor Wu worshiping statues of the Buddha.

During an imperial feast, Emperor Wu ordered that horses be brought to him for him to examine. Midi, and a large number of fellow stable attendants, brought the horses, and as a number of Emperor Wu's beautiful concubines were in attendance, the attendants were struck by their beauty and were looking at them, but Midi did not dare to. Emperor Wu saw Midi and was impressed by his propriety, tall stature, and how healthy and strong the horses under Midi's care were. That same day, he awarded Midi robes and made him the director of the imperial stables, and thereafter became increasingly close to Midi. According to the Hanshu, the reaction of the court was not without some resentment:

Many of the emperor’s relatives and other persons in high position were secretly resentful, saying, ‘His Majesty [Emperor Wu] by some quirk of circumstance gets himself a barbarian boy (胡儿 hu’er) and what does he do but treat him with honor and respect!’ When the emperor heard of their remarks, he only treated Jin Midi more generously than ever.

— Han shu Chapter 68, translation by Watson (1974: 152-153).

As he remembered that the Prince of Xiutu had used golden statues to worship heaven, Emperor Wu gave Midi the surname Jin, meaning "gold". When Jin Midi's mother died, Emperor Wu had her portrait drawn and displayed at his later favorite palace, the Sweet Spring Palace, entitling the portrait, "The Princess of Xiutu" (i.e., not regarding her as a servant any more, but by her former status as princess). Two of Jin Midi's sons became close attendants to Emperor Wu and were favored by Emperor Wu. After one of the sons was grown, on one occasion, he was flirting with Emperor Wu's ladies in waiting when Jin Midi saw them. In anger at his son's inappropriate behavior, killed him, and then reported to Emperor Wu. Emperor Wu was greatly saddened but became even more impressed with Jin Midi.

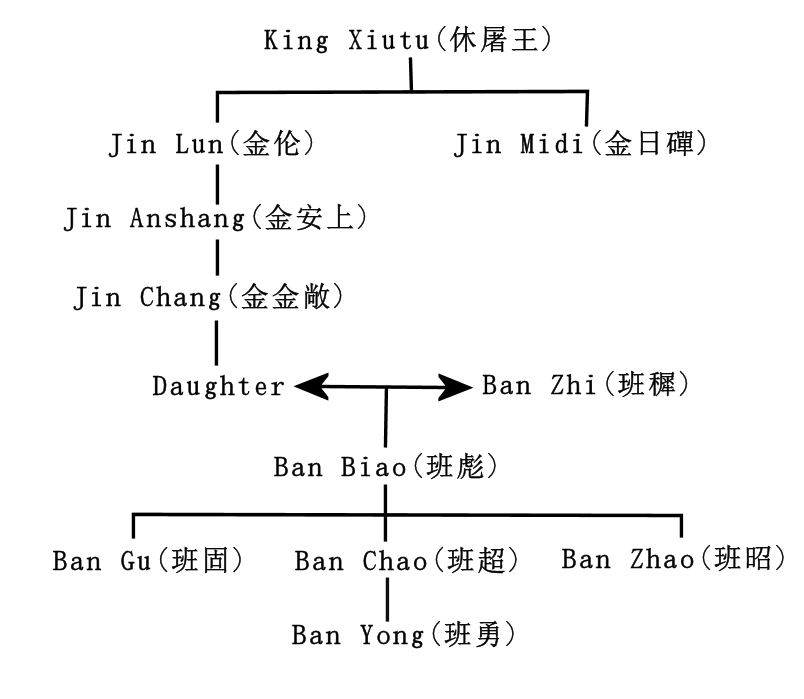
Jin Midi's family was ancestral to the famous historian Ban Gu and the general and diplomat Ban Chao.

In 88 BC, the imperial official Ma Heluo (the great-granduncle of Eastern Han general Ma Yuan) was anxious over the fact that the clan of his friend Jiang Chong had been slaughtered by Emperor Wu. Jiang had falsely accused Emperor Wu's crown prince Liu Ju of treason in 91 BC, causing Liu Ju to rise in rebellion in fear, killing Jiang. Liu Ju was killed, but in the aftermath, Emperor Wu, discovering that Jiang's accusations were false, had Jiang's clan killed. He thus conspired with his brothers to assassinate Emperor Wu. The assassination attempt was thwarted by Jin, as when he saw Ma about to enter Emperor Wu's bedchambers with a knife, he fought and wrestled Ma down until other imperial guards could arrive.

In 87 BC, Emperor Wu was seriously ill, and made his youngest son Liu Fuling crown prince. He summoned his close associates to his bedchambers to designate one of them, Huo Qubing's younger brother Huo Guang, as regent. Huo initially declined, arguing that Jin was more capable, but Jin said: "I'm a foreigner and this will make the Xiongnu think of Han lightly." Emperor Wu thus designated Huo as the primary regent, but also designated Jin and Shangguan Jie secondary regents. He soon died, and Liu Fuling took the throne as Emperor Zhao. (In his will, Emperor Wu, citing the suppression of Ma's plot, created Jin, as well as Huo and Shangguan, marquesses, but Jin, citing Emperor Zhao's young age, declined.)

== During Emperor Zhao's reign ==
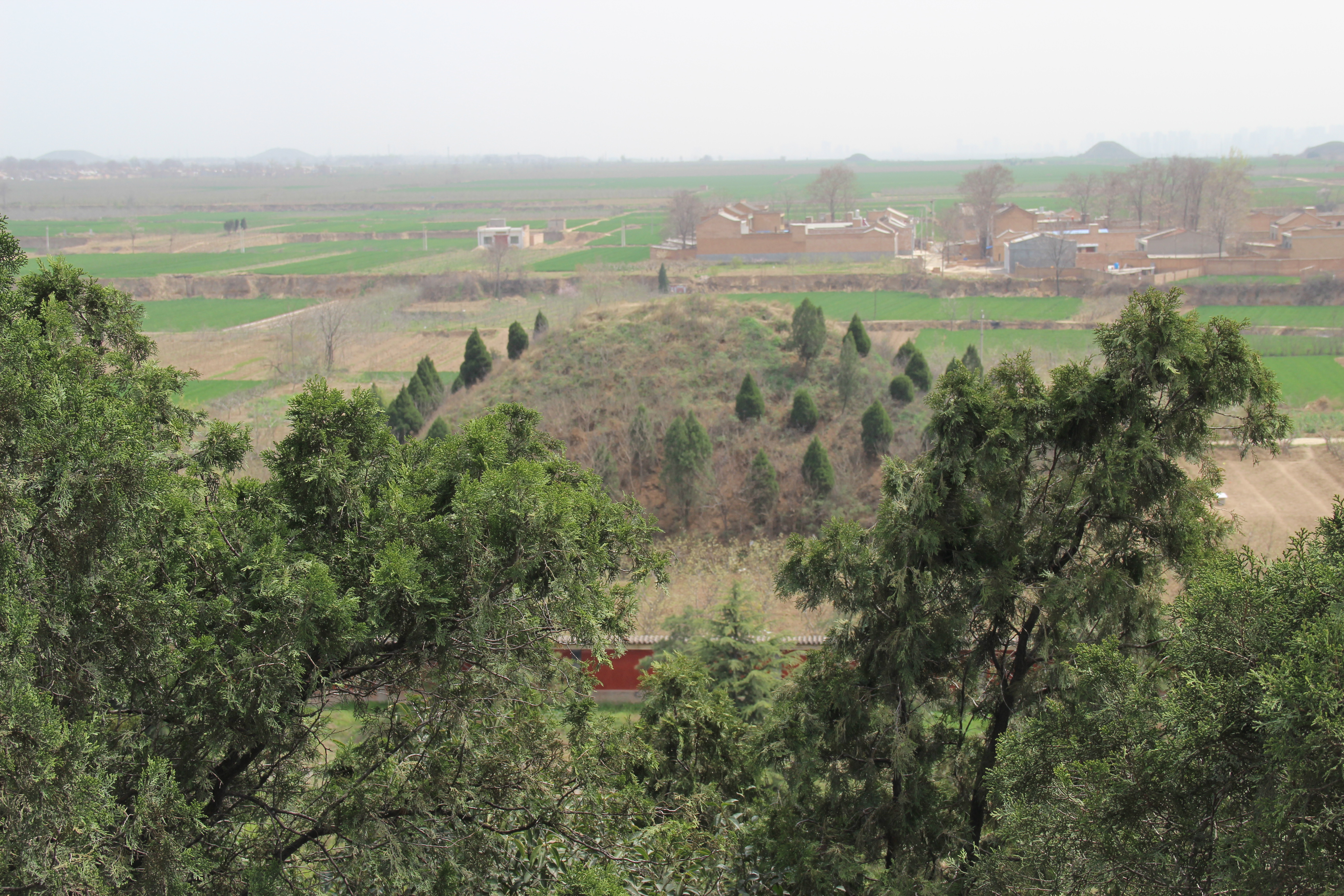
Tomb of Jin Midi, viewed from the top of the Tomb of Han General Huo Qubing, near Maoling

In late 86 BC, Jin Midi became seriously ill. Huo Guang, after discussing with Emperor Zhao, had Emperor Zhao approve a creation of Midi as the Marquess of Du on his death bed. Midi died the next day and was buried near Emperor Wu's tomb. He had 3 children, except for one who was killed by him, the other two served as officials.

His family continued to serve as imperial servants until the end of the Western Han dynasty, with seven generations in total.

== Mausoleum ==
Upon his death, Jin Midi was buried in a Mausoleum located at 34.341407°N 108.582684°E, next to the Mausoleum of Huo Qubing and not far from the Mausoleum of Han Wudi in Maoling.

== Sources ==
- 金日磾 (in Chinese)
- 武威本土历史人物——金日磾 (in Chinese)
- Book of Han, vol. 68.
- Zizhi Tongjian, vols. 19, 20, 21, 22, 23.
- Han Ji, vols. 13, 15, 16 .
- 祭天金人 (in Chinese)
- 休屠王 (in Chinese)
