= Xiutu =

Chinese king

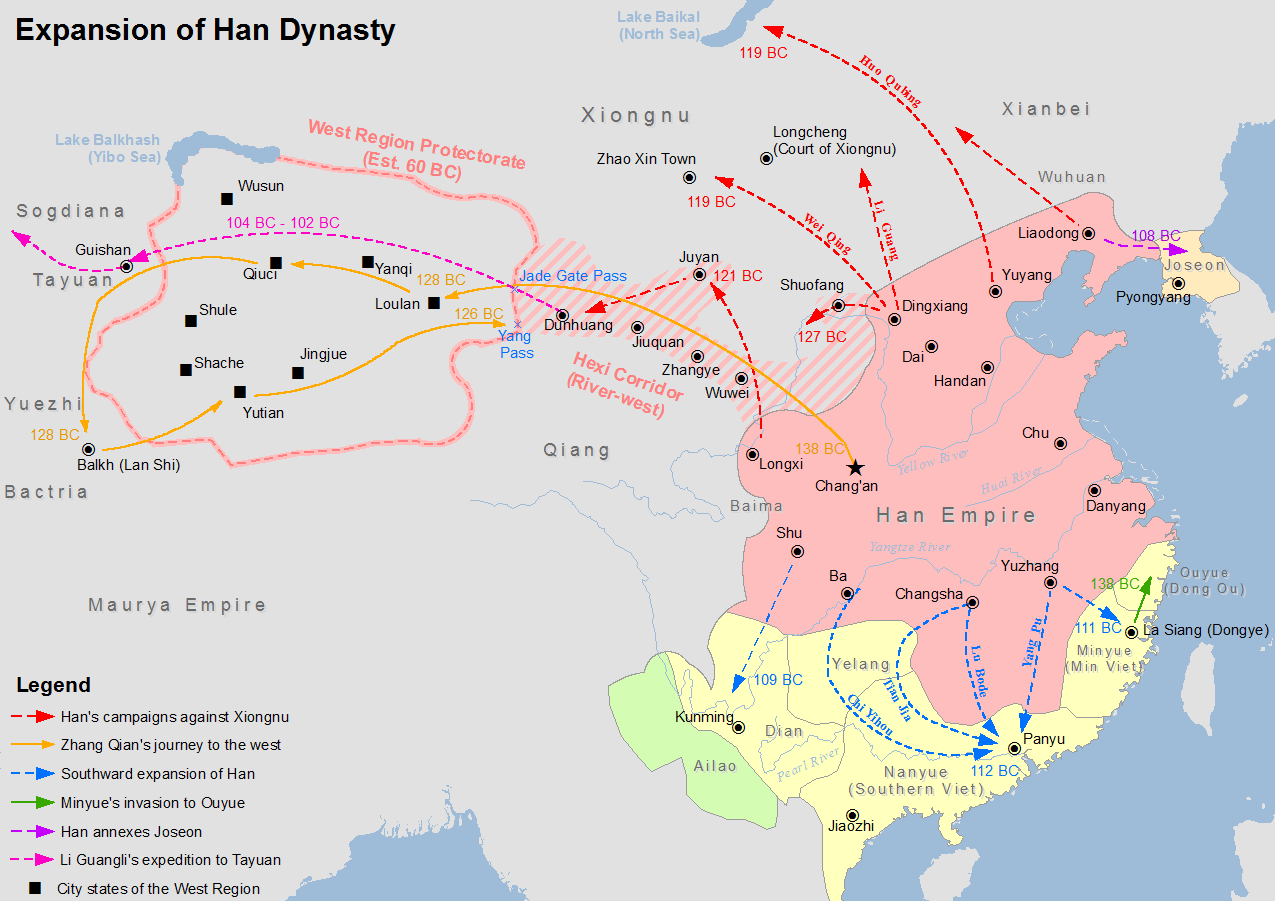
Xiutu' kingdom, west of Wuwei, was attacked by Huo Qubing in 121 BCE.

Xiutu (Chinese: 休屠王; pinyin: Xiūtú Wáng, also romanized as Hsiu-t'u, lit. "The one who puts an end to massacres") was a king in the Hexi Corridor of the Gansu region, west of Wuwei, during the 2nd century BCE. "Xiutu" (休屠) is also an early Chinese transliteration for the name of the Buddha.

According to the Shiji and the Book of Han, King Xiutu, together with King Hunye, was a vassal of the Xiongnu under their ruler Yizhixie (伊稚邪 126–114 BCE), and was antagonistic towards the Han dynasty.

King Xiutu was vaguely described as a "Hu" (barbarian) by the Han. His domain was once held by the Yuezhi, and was positioned between the Xiongnu tribes of the Mongolian steppes to the north, the Han to the east, the Saka to the northwest, the Tocharians to the west, and the Southern Qiang to the south.

Although a vassal, Xiutu was probably not himself a Xiongnu: it is actually reported that his territory was occupied by the Xiongnu as they were pushed westward by the Han.

== Kingdom of Xiutu ==
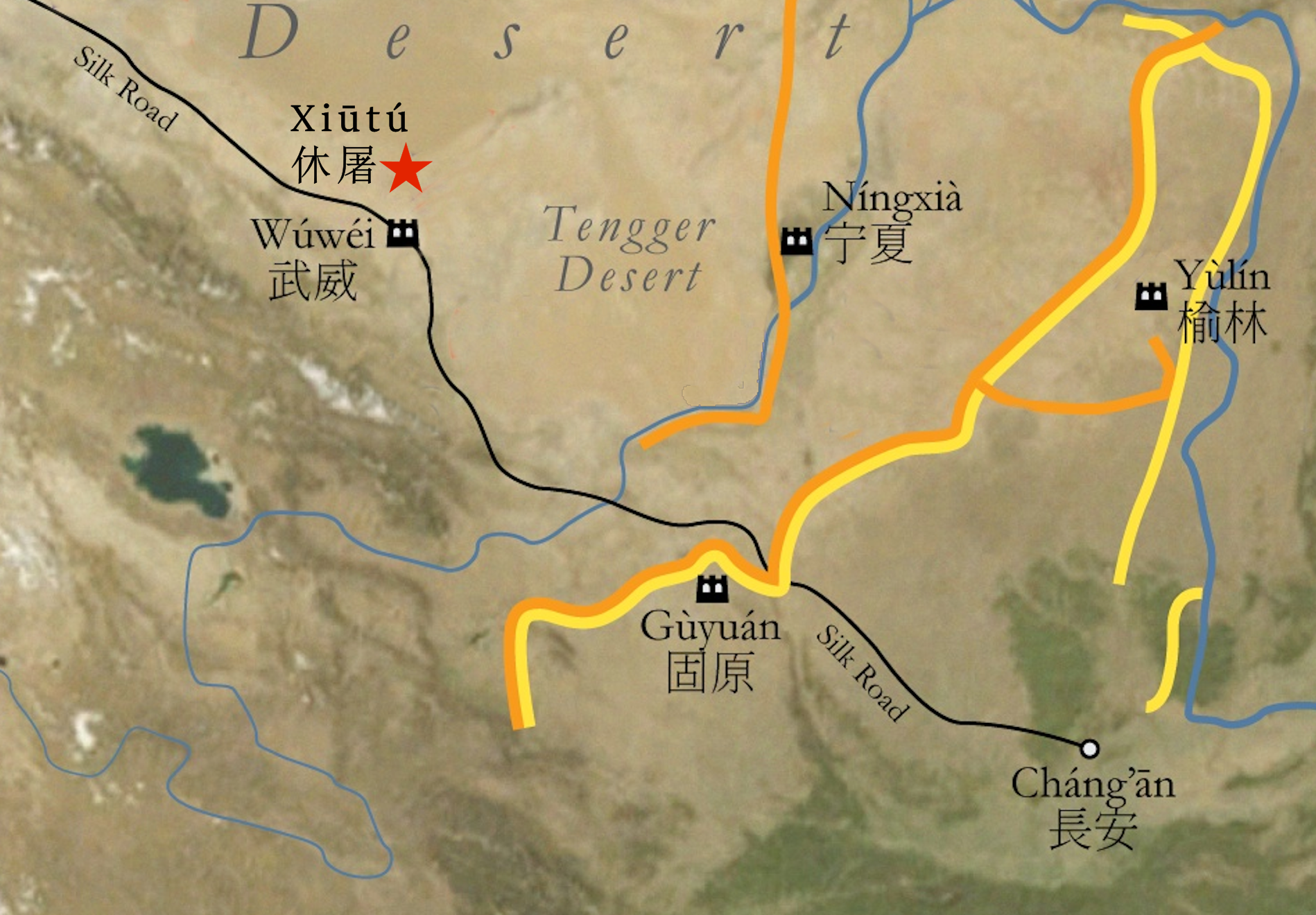
The City of Xiutu was about 20km north of Wuwei, and about 500km beyond Guyuan and its Great Wall built by King Zhao of Qin in 271 BCE, and by Qin Shihuang (circa 210 BCE,).

The Kingdom of Xiutu is closely associated to the Shajing culture (700–100 BCE), which managed to prosper along rivers amid general aridification. The Shajing Culture was able to flourish along the lower Shiyang River as the Zhuye Lake was retreating, while the city of Xiutu prospered along the Hongshui River, permitting a flourishing of nomadic culture within a context of drought. The predecessors of Xiutu in the area of the Hexi Corridor, before the Xiongnu occupation around 176 BCE, were probably the Yuezhi.

The city of Xiutu (休屠城), about 20 km (12 mi) north of Wuwei, has left monumental ruins (38.147380°N 102.693031°E), located on the ancient border of Zhuye Lake. After the conquests of Huo Qubing (121 BCE) the city would be incorporated just inside of the Great Wall built under the Han dynasty. The Minqin Basin along the Shiyang River was named "Xiutuze" (休屠泽, "Lake Xiutu") after the King.

The number of Xiongnus living in the Hexi Corridor at that time is estimated at 50,000 people, and they were living along the rivers, were water resources were naturally abundant.

== Han–Xiongnu Wars ==
When the Han–Xiongnu Wars (133–89 BCE) broke out, the Han dynasty led a campaign against the rulers of the Hexi Corridor. In 121 BCE, Huo Qubing was put in charge of an attack on the Hexi corridor, leading 10,000 light cavalry. He defeated the troops of the Xiongnu. Kings Xiutu and Hunye decided to surrender to the Han, as they were also criticized by the Xiongnu for their military failure. But meeting Huo Qubing with his troops, Xiutu renounced his promise and was killed by King Hunye who also seized his troops. Huo Qubing then attacked the troops of Hunye, killing 8,000 troops, and obtaining the surrender of the remaining 40,000. King Hunye was sent to Chang'an where he was welcomed by Han Wudi, who gave him the title of duke.

King Xiutu has a son named Midi, born in 134 BCE, who was also captured and became a close aid to Han Wudi, becoming known as Jin Midi (金日磾) in Chinese.

== Gold statues ==
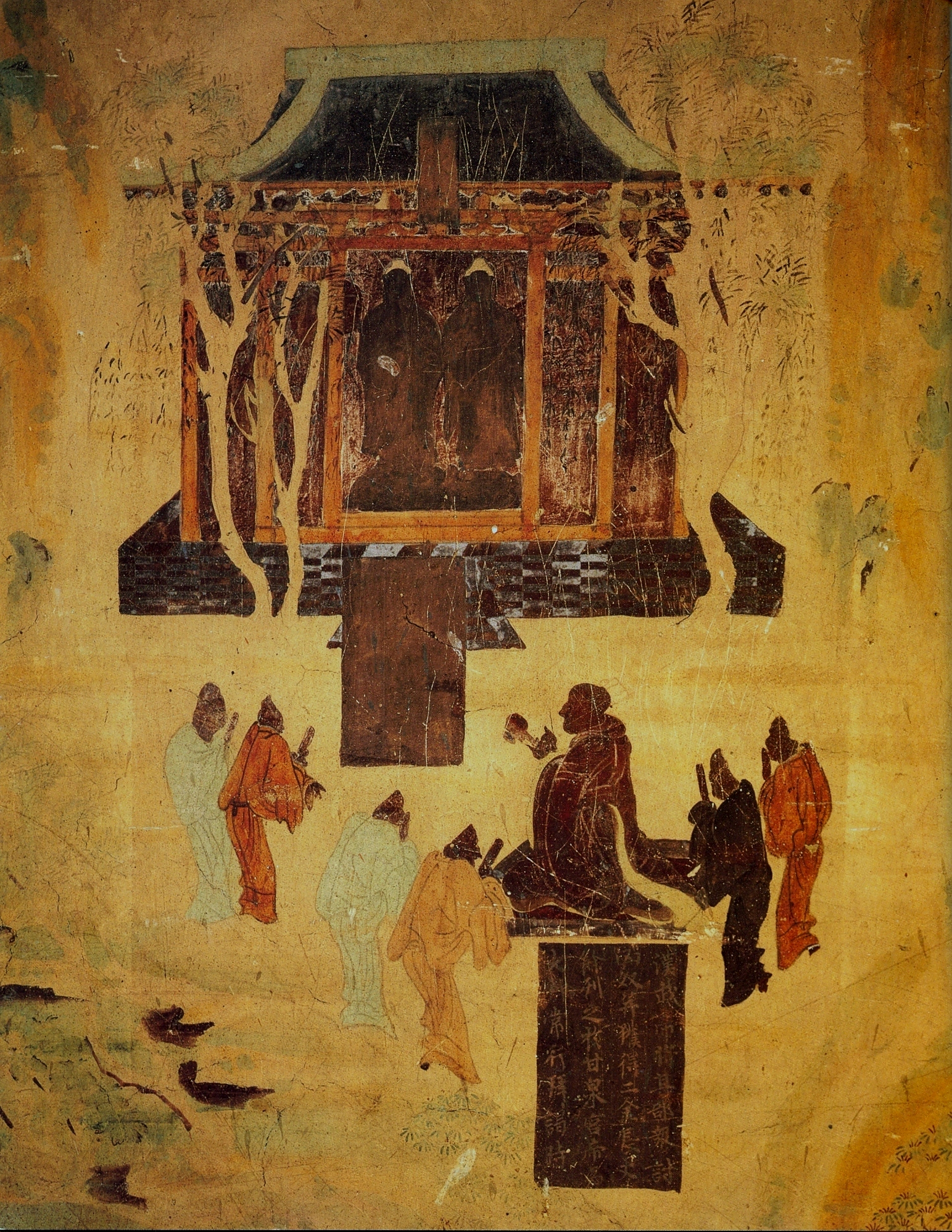
Mogao Caves 8th-century mural depicting Emperor Wu of Han worshipping "golden man" statues.

The Shiji records that in 121 BCE, after Huo Qubing defeated the Xiongnu, he "captured golden (or gilded) men used by the King of Xiutu to worship Heaven", and these were then transferred to the Ganquan Temple near the Imperial Palace of Han Wudi. The statue (or statues) measured more than one zhang (about 3 m (9.8 ft)), and was put on display, incense was burned and prostrations were made.

The expression "金人" ("golden men") may show some unfamiliarity with this kind of free-standing anthropomorphic idol. Sima Qian probably personally saw which was brought back by Huo Qubing in 121 BCE, while he was working on his Records of the Grand Historian.

These golden statues were unlikely to be Buddhist because the Xiutu are not known to have been Buddhist and Jin Midi became very popular at the Chinese court to the point where his peculiarities were noted, but not worship of Buddhism. Jin Midi was only said to have worshipped the golden statue, now in the Imperial Palace, and this is the reason why he was given the family name "Jin" ("Gold") by the Emperor Han Wudi.

Still, the term "Xiutu" is also known to have been used in Chinese as an early transliteration for the name of the Buddha and for Buddhist monks. This has reinforced suggestions that King Xiutu and the golden statue may have had a Buddhist character, leading to claims that Buddhism already entered China by the time of the Western Han (202 BCE – 9 CE). According to Christoph Baumer "it is conceivable that this 'Golden man' was a statue of the Buddha".

A New Account of the Tales of the World (c. 6th century CE) claims that the golden statues were more than ten feet high, and Emperor Wu of Han sacrificed to it in the Ganquan palace, which "is how Buddhism gradually spread into (China)." In Cave 323 in Mogao caves (near Dunhuang in the Tarim Basin), Emperor Wudi is shown worshipping two golden statues, with the following inscription (which closely paraphrases the traditional accounts of Huo Qubing's expedition):

Emperor Han Wudi directed his troops to fight the Xiongnu and obtained two golden statues more than 1 zhàng [3 meters] tall, that he displayed in the Ganquan Palace and regularly worshipped.

— Inscription of Cave 323 in the Mogao caves

The Han expedition to the west and the capture of booty by general Huo Qubing is well documented, but the later Buddhist interpretation at the Mogao Caves of the worship of these statues as a means to propagate Buddhism in China is probably apocryphal, since Han Wudi is not known to have ever worshipped the Buddha.

The statue(s) were moved to a temple in Yong county, Yunyang prefecture, near the royal summer palace Ganquan (modern Xianyang, Shaanxi), in the former capital of the Qin dynasty. Wei Shou believes it was located in the palace. The Ganquan Palace was a place of worship. Jin Midi, the son of Xiutu, became a favorite of Emperor Wu, who expanded the Ganquan Palace and spent much time there. Due to Emperor Wu's close relations with Jin, both his parents were honored and the golden statue(s) were placed in a temple dedicated to the spirit of Jinglu (a type of precious Xiongnu sword) for the worship of Xiutu. The locale seems to have been devoted to foreign deities as another temple dedicated to Yue practices was located in the same place. The golden statue(s) later disappeared and the temple came to be known for the sword.

== Han occupation of the Hexi Corridor ==
Following their conquest of the Hexi Corridor, Han authorities incorporated the new territories into prefectures and counties, such as the Wuwei Prefecture. Numerous people were transferred from the Central Plains, to repopulate the Hexi Corridor.

== Descendants of Xiutu ==
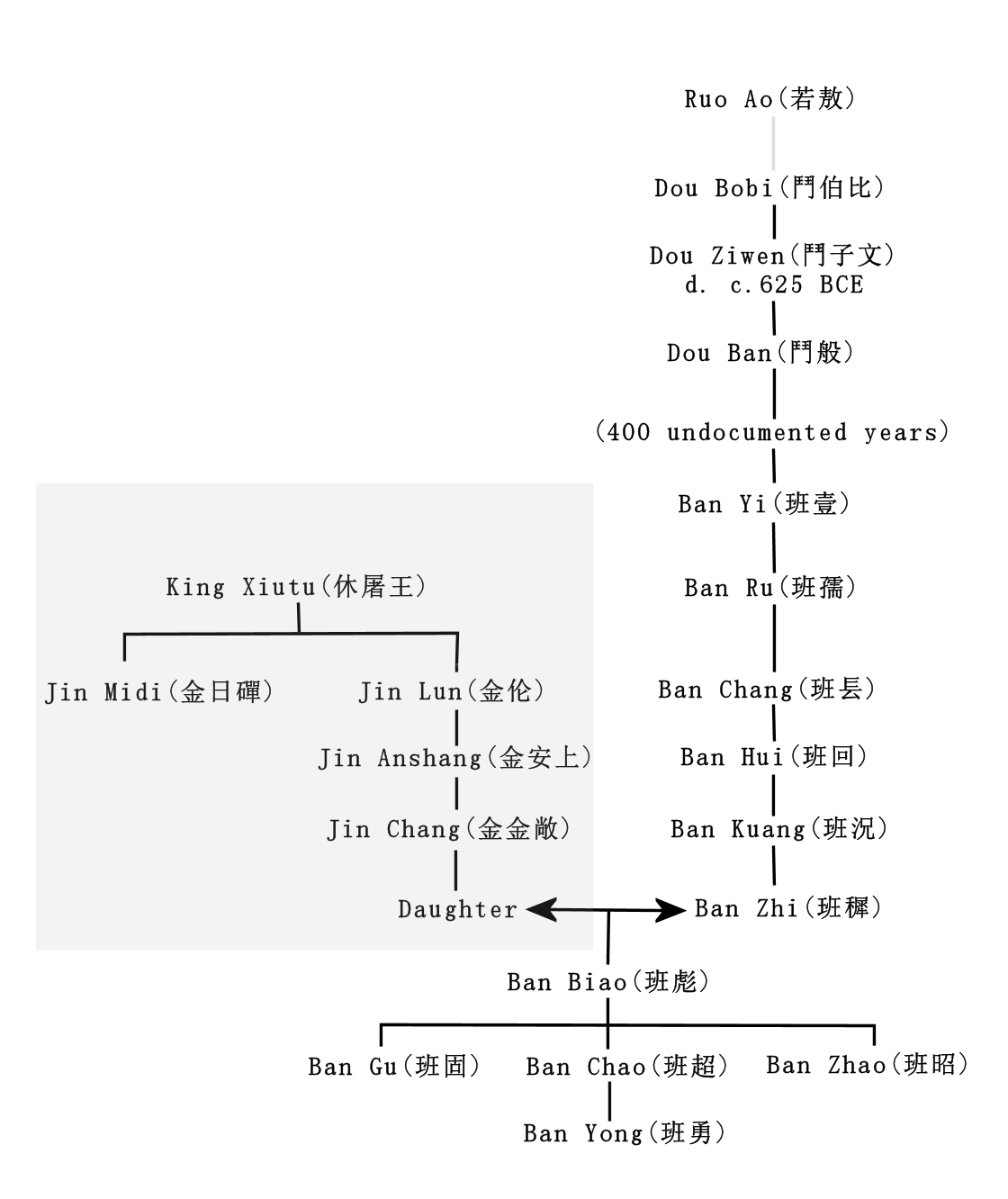
Family trees of King Xiutu and the Ban family.

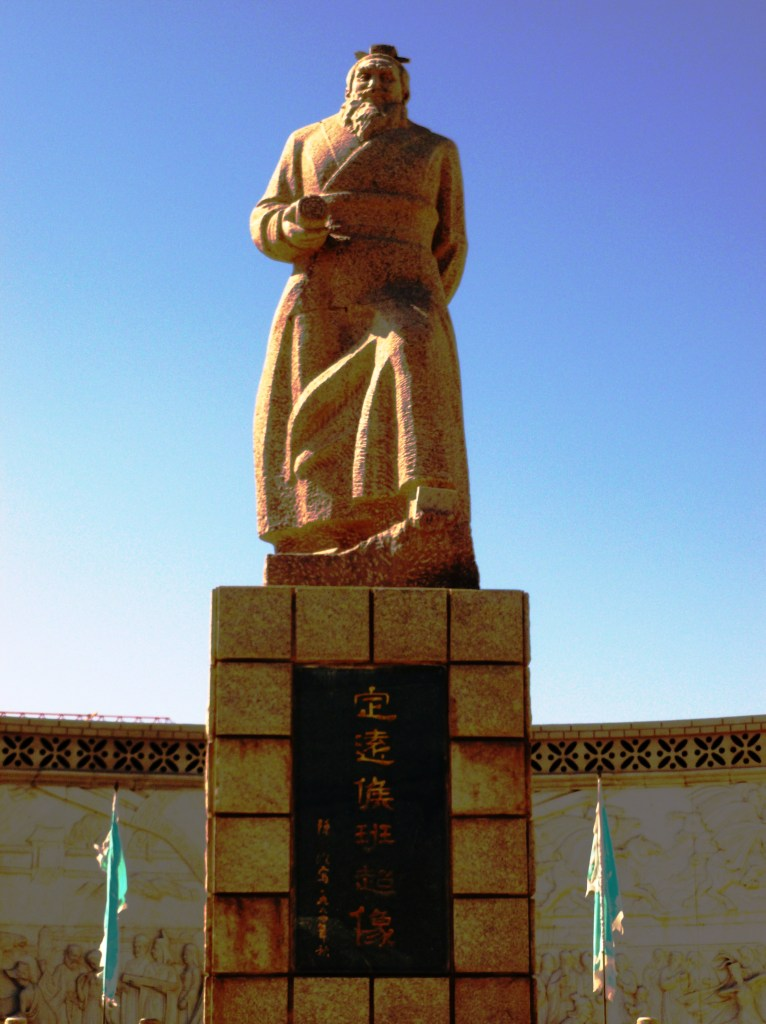
General Ban Chao was a descendant of the Xiongnu King Xiutu.

Xiutu was an ancestor of the famous Ban family, and included in his direct descendants through the maternal line the historian of the Hanshu Ban Gu, the diplomat and general Ban Chao and the female historian Ban Zhao. Xiutu had two sons, Jin Midi, who was given the Jin name by Emperor Han Wudi, and Jin Lun. One of Jin Lun's grandson was Jin Chang, an attendant to Emperor Yuan of Han (48–33 BCE), whose daughter married Ban Zhi of the Ban clan. Ban Zhi and his Xiongnu wife's son was the historian and politician Ban Biao, one of their grandsons was historian Ban Gu, and another grandson was General Ban Chao, Ban Zhao was their granddaughter. The Xiongnu origins of Ban Biao on the maternal side might help explain the skills of his illustrious son and grandsons in dealing with matters related to China's history and foreign relations.

After their surrender, King Xiutu's people were widely distributed across five northern frontier commanderies of the Han. Those that remained near his former domain were named after him as the Xiutu (休屠), while those that were relocated to the Ordos Plateau and Shanxi are believed to have become the Xiuchuge (休屠各) or Chuge (屠各). The two branches continued to exist until the 6th century CE, with the Chuge being strongly linked to the imperial Liu clan of the Han-Zhao dynasty during the Sixteen Kingdoms period.
