= Lu Bode =

Chinese military general during the Western Han dynasty

Lu Bode (Chinese: 路博德; pinyin: Lù Bódé; Wade–Giles: Lu Po-te; fl. 119 BC–?) was a Chinese military general during the Western Han dynasty.

Lu was from Pingzhou (平州) in the Xihe region of western China (present-day Lishi District of Lüliang, Shanxi). In 119 BCE, Emperor Wu of Han dispatched Lu along with Huo Qubing on an expedition north to attack the Xiongnu. After a successful campaign Lu was awarded the title General Fubo (伏波; literally "subduer of the waves"), a title later awarded to other illustrious military leaders such as Ma Yuan. Lu, along with General Yang Pu, was one of the leaders of the five armies who advanced towards Panyu (present-day Guangzhou) near the Giaochi border to conquer Nanyue and annex it into the Han empire. Thereafter, Lu also attacked the island of Hainan off the south eastern coast of China. After a successful assault, he divided the new territory into the twin prefectures of Zhuya (珠崖郡) and Dan'er (儋耳郡) thus also annexing Hainan island into the Han empire. Despite these military successes, Lu was later demoted for an unspecified transgression. The last known military action he participated was an unsuccessful Northern campaign (under General Li Guangli) against the Xiongnu in 97 BCE.
