= Zhao Xin (general) =

2nd-century BC Han dynasty general

- 赵信
- Died: 111 BCE
- Military career
- Allegiance: Han and Xiongnu
- Rank: General
- Conflicts: Battle of Mobei

Zhao Xin (simplified Chinese: 赵信; traditional Chinese: 趙信; pinyin: Zhào Xìn; Wade–Giles: Chao Hsin) was a prominent Xiongnu general in the late 2nd century BCE during the Han–Xiongnu War. He defected first to the Han dynasty then back to the Xiongnu.

== Life ==
In 131 BCE, Zhao Xin defected from the Xiongnu to the Han, and he became known as the Marquis of Xi (Chinese: 翕侯). His name was probably adopted during his service to the Han.

He was one of the six generals led by Wei Qing during a Han expedition against the Xiongnu in 123 BCE, and led a 3,000-strong vanguard force along with fellow general Su Jian. Although the two Han campaigns were successful, Zhao Xin was defeated and surrendered to the Xiongu. Su Jian's forces were also defeated, but he managed to escape.

In 119 BCE, Zhao Xin is recorded as acting on behalf of the Xiongnu to broker a heqin marriage with the Han. Though leading to debate at the Han court, the proposal was rejected.

A Xiongnu fortress named after Zhao Xin was constructed near the Khangai Mountains, soon after his submission to Yizhixie Chanyu. The fortress was later destroyed by Wei Qing's forces during the end phase of the Battle of Mobei.

Zhao Xin died in 111 BCE.

== See also ==
- Battle of Mobei
