= Ganquan Palace =

Archaeological site in Xianyang, China

- 甘泉宫 (Chinese)
- Interactive map of Ganquan Palace

History
- Built: Qin dynasty (221 – 207 BCE)

The Ganquan Palace or Sweet Spring Palace (Chinese: 甘泉宫; pinyin: Gānquán Gōng) was a Qin dynasty (221–207 BCE) imperial palace with later additions by Emperor Wu of Han in 138 BCE. It was a temporary imperial residence (离宫, lígōng) outside the capital, which was Xianyang for the Qin and Chang'an for the Han. Its ruins are located in Chunhua County, Xianyang, Shaanxi, China. It is a Major Historical and Cultural Site Protected at the National Level.

The Book of Han records that in 121 BCE when General Huo Qubing defeated the armies of the Xiongnu prince of Xiutu (休屠, in modern-day Gansu), he "captured a golden (or gilded) man used by the King of Xiutu to worship Heaven". The statues were later moved to the Yunyang 雲陽 Temple, near the royal summer Ganquan palace in the capital of Xianyang:

漢武帝將其部眾討凶奴,並獲得二金(人),(各)長丈餘,刊〔列〕之於甘泉宮,帝(以)為大神,常行拜褐時
Emperor Han Wudi directed his troops to fight the Xiongnu and obtained two golden statues that he displayed in the Ganquan Palace and regularly worshipped.

— Book of Han, and Inscription of Cave 323 in the Mogao caves
