= General of agile cavalry =

Military rank in Imperial China

General of agile cavalry (Chinese: 驃騎將軍) was a military rank in Imperial China. The title was introduced during the reign of Emperor Wu of Han. The title was used in subsequent dynasties, sometimes as the general-in-chief of agile cavalry (Chinese: 骠骑大将军).
