= Zhuye Lake =

Lake in Gansu, China

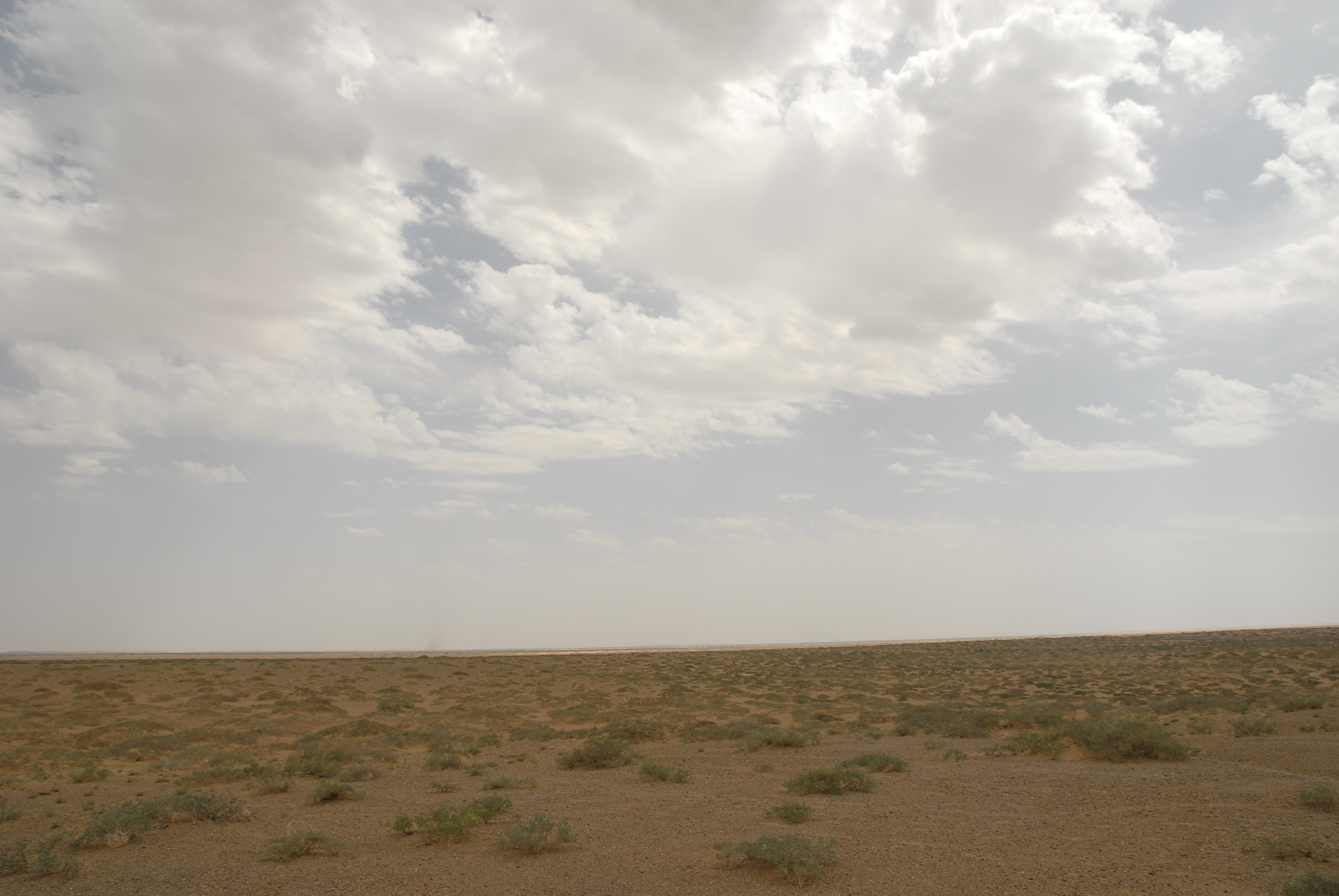
Zhuye Lake

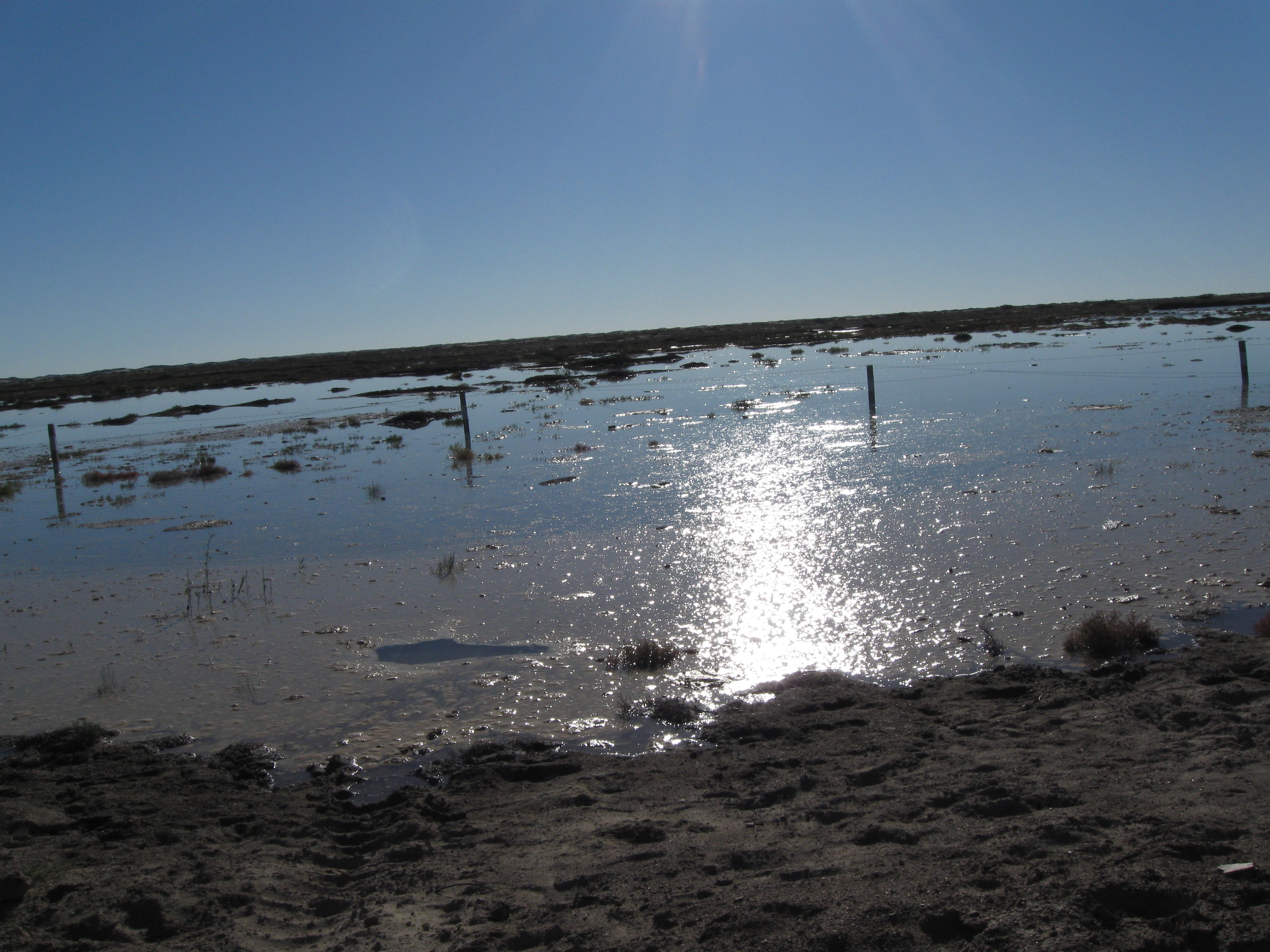
Zhuye Lake

Zhuye Lake (Chinese: 猪野泽; pinyin: Zhūyě Zé) is the terminal lake of the Shiyang River, which is located in the east of the Hexi Corridor in Gansu Province, China. Zhuye Lake is located in the marginal area of the Asian monsoon and is affected by both the Asian monsoon system and the Westerly jet. By understanding the Holocene record in Zhuye Lake, the interaction of different climate systems during the Holocene can be studied. At the same time, the Asian monsoon system is climatically dynamic; changes in its sphere of influence can result in severe drought or flood over large, densely populated, regions. In addition, Zhuye Lake and the surrounding area in arid NW China are in ecological imbalance – a consequence of human impacts and climate. Understanding the environmental history here can assist climatological forecasting of the Asian monsoon system and ecosystem reconstruction.

== Reference guide of the Late Quaternary climate change for Zhuye Lake and the Hexi Corridor ==
Zhuye Lake and the Hexi Corridor are located in the northern edge of the Qinghai-Tibetan Plateau, on the northern side of the Qilian Mountains, while in a transition zone between the Gobi Desert and highland. The area is in the northwest margin of the Asian summer monsoon. Some summer precipitation is from the summer monsoon moisture transport, while the area is mainly controlled by the mid-latitude westerly circulation, which is a key area for studies on the interactions between the summer monsoon and the westerlies. In recent years, scientists have made a lot of progress on the late Quaternary environmental changes in the area, and promoted the study of long-term monsoon and westerly winds changes, but there are still some controversies. A major problem is that there are a large volume of papers in the area that are related to the Quaternary science while various subjects are involved. That is not conducive for scholars to understand the late Quaternary conditions in the area. The reference guide is designed to organize literatures in relevant disciplines, which is good for scientists to understand the late Quaternary environments easily, while the guide also represents the research progress of Lanzhou University on the late Quaternary environments.

=== Millennial-scale environmental changes in Zhuye Lake, northwest China ===
Lake records from Zhuye Lake show that early Holocene was relatively humid and the mid-Holocene environment was characterized by an appropriate combination of precipitation and evaporation. An arid trend appeared during the late Holocene. There was a centennial-scale drought event during the mid-Holocene, which was recorded by sand layers in various locations of the lake basin. Environmental changes in Zhuye Lake are mainly affected by the evolution of the Asian summer monsoon, but also affected by the mid-latitude westerlies, reflecting the interaction of the two large circulation systems.

=== Millennial-scale environmental changes in Yanchi Lake, northwest China ===
The Yanchi Lake record is consistent with paleoclimate records from typical monsoon domain and the Qinghai-Tibet Plateau, which indicates the lake expansion during the Late Glacial and early Holocene and a lake retreat during the late Holocene. This change shows the effects of the Asian summer monsoon on the millennial-scale and variations of the northern boundary of the Asian summer monsoon.

=== Millennial-scale environmental changes in Huahai Lake, northwest China ===
Millennium-scale environmental changes recorded in the sediments of Huahai Lake showed that basin-wide runoff was high while erosion and deposition processes were intense during the early Holocene. The effective moisture during the mid-Holocene was still high, then the late Holocene was relatively dry. This change in water conditions was related to the strong early-to-mid Holocene Asian summer monsoon that brings more rainfall to this area. As a result, the runoff was high and the erosion was intensive correspondingly. This changing pattern of Holocene moisture conditions were also affected by the mid-latitude westerlies to some extent.

=== Millennial-scale climate change cycles in Zhuye Lake ===
Paleoenvironmental proxies in lake sediments from Zhuye Lake show that there are distinct ~256 ~512 ~1024 climate cycles, which are consistent with millennial-scale and centennial-scale climate cycles in the typical Asian summer monsoon domain during the Holocene. Meanwhile, lake sediments in some sites of the lake basin also recorded the Holocene North Atlantic Ice Debris Events (Bond Events). These records from monsoon marginal zones reflected regional responses to global scale Holocene climate cycles.

=== Mid-Holocene dry intervals in Zhuye Lake ===
Mid-Holocene drought events were widely recovered from lake sediments in monsoon marginal zones, but the time scales and mechanisms are still in dispute. According to lithology, chronology and paleoclimate proxies, this drought event occurred mainly between ~ 8.0-~ 7.0 cal kyr BP and its influence was limited in the middle and lower reaches of the Shiyang River whereas the upper reaches were less affected. The drought event could be primarily controlled by changes in the ratio of water and heat and the interaction between the summer monsoon and the westerly winds.

=== Chronologies in Zhuye Lake ===
Chronologies of lake sediments in Zhuye Lake were mainly from pollen concentrates, bulk organic matter, bulk inorganic matter and mollusk shells AMS 14C and conventional 14C dating, as well as OSL dating. A comparison between different dating methods and results shows that the reservoir effect was relatively weak during the Holocene. However, inverted ages also exist in some sedimentary layers, especially in the strata of the Late Glacial and early Holocene. The disordered ages in those sedimentary layers were mainly affected by the reworking effects. According to the OSL and radiocarbon ages from paleo-shorelines in the northeast of the lake basin, high lake levels mainly occurred during the early and middle Holocene, and a drought tendency appeared during the late Holocene. The result is consistent with the lake sediment proxies from various sites of the lake basin.

=== Palynological records in Zhuye Lake ===
Along with millennial-scale environmental and ecological changes, pollen records in Zhuye Lake reflected basin-wide vegetation history well. However, affected by the complicated topography of the lake basin, there are some differences in pollen assemblages from different sites of the lake basin. Pollen records from the western lake were significantly affected by alluvial pollen whereas pollen records from the middle and the eastern lake reflect pollen assemblages well mixed by lake hydrodynamic processes. Overall, tree pollen is relatively high during the early Holocene due to high runoff and precipitation. Pollen concentration was high and pollen types were rich during the mid-Holocene. A late Holocene dry tendency was also recorded by pollen assemblages in the lake. Pollen records in Zhuye Lake are consistent with other proxy records and indicate environmental changes in the lake and watershed reliably.

=== Lithology, minerals and SEM (Scanning Electron Microscopy) analysis of quartz sands ===
Lake sediment lithology, minerals and SEM (Scanning Electron Microscopy) analysis of quartz sands are also good indicators reflecting the evolution of the lake in arid regions. Lacustrine sediments in Zhuye Lake are mainly characterized by grey silts. Some lake sediment layers are mixed with peat or rust brown layers, while grey, brown or yellow sand layers are also embedded between lake sediments. On the top of the sediment sections in the lake, aeolian sediments with uneven thickness are deposited, which is an indicative of the lake retreat during the late Holocene. These changes in lithology can be linked to lake hydrodynamic conditions and sand activities in the area. Carbonate mineral is the major salt mineral in the lake. Millennial-scale evolution of salt minerals reflects the general rules of Salt Lake, and changes in salt minerals correspond with variations in other proxies. The region is rich in carbonate minerals, forming a huge inorganic carbon pool. SEM analysis of quartz sands reveals that sand sediments are from diverse sources in the region. Sands in the lake have experienced both the aeolian and the lacustrine deposition processes, indicating the complicated formation processes of those sand layers.

=== Geochemical proxies in Zhuye Lake ===
Total organic carbon (TOC), carbon and nitrogen ratio (C/N) and organic carbon isotope (δ13Corg) are commonly used in lake sediments for paleoclimate reconstruction, which are indicators of basin-wide primary productivity and vegetation types in lakes and watersheds, as well as the preservation of organic matter. Changes in TOC and C/N have a similar trend and their high values indicate high basin-wide primary productivity. Changes in δ13Corg are negatively correlated with other two proxies, while its lower values indicate high effective moisture. Lake sediment geochemical proxies correspond well with other sediment proxies, indicating high precipitation and runoff during the early Holocene, the highest primary productivity in the mid-Holocene and an arid trend in late Holocene.

=== Paleo-lake geomorphology of Zhuye Lake ===
Height measurements and OSL/14C dating of paleo-shorelines in Zhuye Lake can better understand the formation and evolution of lake levels during the late Quaternary. According to field surveys, there are 9 paleo-shorelines and one lake terrace in the northeast of Zhuye Lake. OSL and 14C ages have shown that high lake levels existed during the early and middle Holocene, and the lake retreated significantly during the late Holocene. On the Holocene millennial-scale, there are some differences between OSL ages and 14C ages on those paleo-shorelines. However, they commonly show the high lake level periods during the early and middle Holocene. Major differences between the two dating methods appeared in ages of the MIS3 and the MIS5. Regarding the dating theories, the two methods are different. Further studies are still needed for a comparison between the two methods.

=== Lake water balance and geographical information science (GIS) ===
Atmospheric circulation features and the evaporation play important roles in millennial-scale lake evolution. Lake evaporation is mainly affected by relative humidity, temperature, vapor pressure and sunshine duration. According to modern observations, temperature and relative humidity have important roles in Holocene millennial-scale lake level changes at Zhuye Lake. Further studies have shown that lake level changes are mainly controlled by many factors, and the basin-wide precipitation is the main controlling factor, but the lake evaporation and the basin-wide evapotranspiration also affect millennial-scale changes of lake area.

=== Modern climate change processes in Zhuye Lake and monsoon marginal zones ===
Modern process of climate change is the basis for the study of paleoclimate change. The northwest margin of the Asian summer monsoon is influenced by both the monsoon and the westerly winds, where the paleoclimate change reflects a certain degree of complexity. Through the study of the modern process of regional climate on modern time scales, the interaction between monsoon and westerly winds is obvious, and this modern process can be used to imply the long-term interaction between the two climate systems.

=== Lake evolution simulations in the Asian monsoon marginal zones ===
Paleoclimate simulations and lake records are two important means of past global change research. Simulation approach focuses on the study of paleoclimate change mechanism, and the lake record is mainly used for paleoclimate reconstruction. The combination of the two methods is an important way to understand paleoclimate change and long-term water cycle mechanisms. According to CCSM 3.0 paleoclimate models, lake water & energy balance models, paleoclimate simulation results match well with the lake records in monsoon marginal zones since the Last Glacial Maximum (LGM). The Zhuye Lake record is a typical record in monsoon marginal zones, which matches well with the simulation results, and the simulation method further explains the mechanism of the millennial-scale lake evolution.
