= Natural barrier =

Category of geographical feature

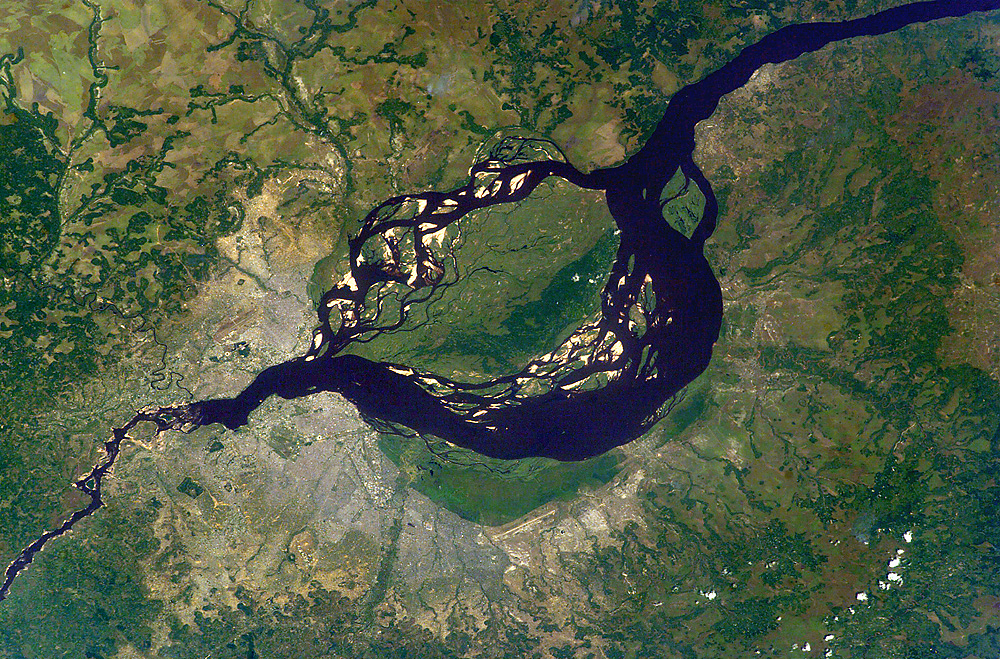
The Congo River serves as a natural barrier dividing the Republic of the Congo from the Democratic Republic of the Congo. The two nations' respective capital cities can be seen on either side of the river.

A natural barrier is a physical feature that protects or hinders travel through or over. Mountains, swamps, deserts and ice fields are among the clearest examples of natural barriers. Rivers are a more ambiguous example, as they may obstruct large-scale movement across them (especially by armies) but may facilitate smaller-scale movement along them in boats, once some of the people in the region have developed the relevant technologies. Seas have likewise been an obstacle at first, then a convenient medium for transport along coastlines, and finally a medium for intercontinental transport. Water can protect island states like the Venetian Republic or Great Britain from dangerous neighbors, and simultaneously connect them to the wider world.

Natural barriers have been important factors in human history, by obstructing migration and invasion. For example, Jared Diamond argues that West European nations have been the dominant powers of the last 500 years because Europe's many natural barriers divided it into competing nation-states and this competition forced the European nations to encourage innovation and avoid technological stagnation. Natural barriers are similarly important to biogeography.

Some examples of natural barriers are the:

- Himalayas
- Grand Canyon
- Dead Sea
- Mississippi River
- Sierra Madre
