= Fa (philosophy) =

Concept in classical Chinese philosophy

- Chinese: 法
- Literal meaning: standard, model, example, measure, norm, way, solution, rule, method, technique (shu), regulation, protocol, statute, law. to imitate; to emulate.
Transcriptions
Standard Mandarin
- Hanyu Pinyin: fà

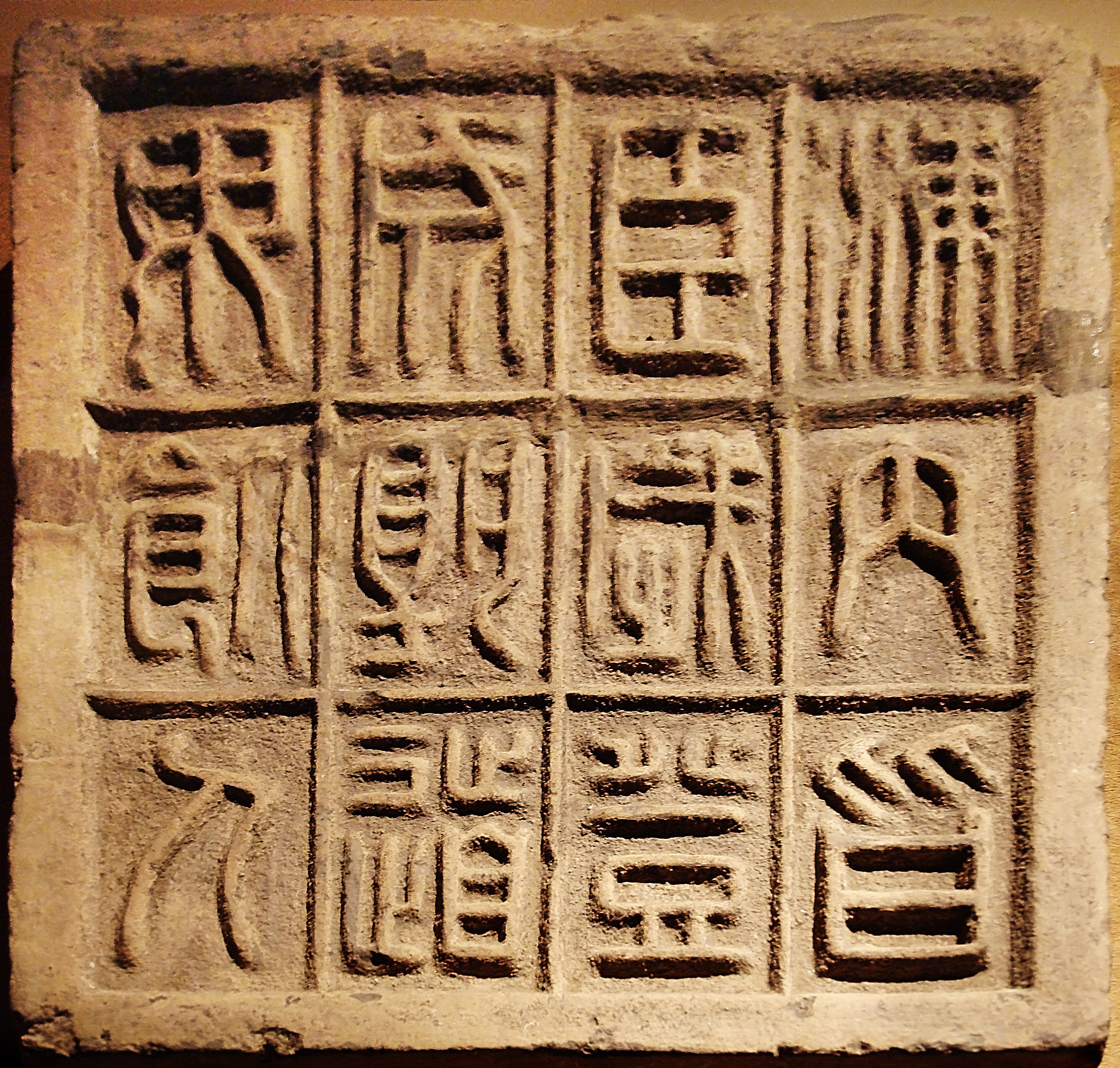
Small seal scripts were standardized by Li Si after the First Emperor of China gained control of the country, evolving from the larger seal scripts of previous dynasties. The 12 characters on this slab of floor brick affirm that it is an auspicious moment for the First Emperor to ascend the throne, as the country is united and no men will be dying along the road.

Fa is a concept in Chinese philosophy that concerns aspects of ethics, logic, and law. Although it can be accurately translated as 'law' in some contexts, especially modern Chinese, it refers to a 'model' or 'standard' for the performance of behavior in most ancient texts, namely the Mozi, with a prominent example including the performance of carpentry. Although theoretically earlier, Fa comes to prominence in the Mohist school of thought. An administrative use of fa standards is prominently elaborated in Legalism, but the school of names also used fa (models) for litigation. Given its broadness, the term fa even included medical models (theories).

Fa was still considered important by Warring States period Confucians. Xunzi, whose work would ultimately be foundational to Confucian philosophy during the Han dynasty, took up fa, suggesting that standards could only be properly assessed by the Confucian sage (聖; shèng), and that the most important fa were the very rituals that Mozi had ridiculed for their ostentatious waste and lack of benefit for the people at large.

In Han Fei's philosophy, the king is the sole source of fa (including 'law'), taught to the common people so that there would be a harmonious society free of chance occurrences, disorder, and "appeal to privilege". High officials were not to be held above the fa, nor were they allowed to independently create their own fa, uniting both executive fiat and rule of law.

Despite a usage by Shang Yang including penal law, in Imperial China fa more commonly referred to government institutions, such as for agricultural loans, than to law per se. The Qin dynasty differentiated the body of statues under the term lu 律, though lu does include a similar root meaning of measurement (like Metre). Originally meaning pitch pipe, it referred to a chromatic scale subdividing four solar seasons as twelve, with much of Qin law being administrative.

== Related terms ==
In the early Han dynasty, fa was sometimes used in place of fan 范 as more commonly used in reference to cash casting molds. Fan also has meanings of pattern, model, example.

== Mohism ==
The concept of fa first gained importance in the Mohist school of thought. To Mozi, a standard must stand "three tests" in order to determine its efficacy and morality. The first of these tests was its origin, as to whether the standard had precedence in the actions or thought of the mythological sage kings of the Xia dynasty, whose examples are frequently cited in classical Chinese philosophy. The second test was one of validity; does the model stand up to evidence in the estimation of the people? The third and final test was one of applicability; this final one is a utilitarian estimation of the net good that, if implemented, the standard would have on both the people and the state.

The third test speaks to the fact that to the Mohists, a fa was not simply an abstract model, but an active tool. The real-world use and practical application of fa were vital. Yet fa as models were also used in later Mohist logic as principles used in deductive reasoning. As classical Chinese philosophical logic was based on analogy rather than syllogism, fa were used as benchmarks to determine the validity of logical claims through comparison. There were three fa in particular that were used by these later Mohists to assess such claims, which were mentioned earlier. The first was considered a "root" standard, a concern for precedence and origin. The second, a "source", a concern for empiricism. The third, a "use", a concern for the consequence and pragmatic utility of a standard. These three fa were used by the Mohists to both promote social welfare and denounce ostentation or wasteful spending.

== Mohist and Confucian fa ==
Described with reference to the square, compass or plumb-line, Mozi used fa in the sense of models and standards for copy and imitation in action. As in Confucianism, Mozi's ruler is intended to act as the fa (or example) for the nobles and officials. From this, the concept of fa develops towards political technique.

Illustrated by the scale, grain-leveler and ink and line, together with a benevolent heart, Mencius's ruler will not achieve effective results without fa. A late contemporary of Shen Buhai and Shang Yang, Mencius's fa more broadly represents models, exemplars and names. Amongst other categories, including techniques of the heart-mind, Mencius's fa includes more specific examples of physical statistics such as temperatures, volumes, consistencies, weights, sizes, densities, distances, and quantities.

Xunzi's notion of fa arguably derives from Confucian li as applied to the regulation of human behavior. The Great Appendix or Ten Wings of the Book of Changes, added by Confucian scholars during the Western Han dynasty, defines fa as "to institute something so that we can use it."

== Shen Buhai Ch 43 ==
Taking Shang Yang as representative, Han Fei considered fa (standards) necessary, as including law, decrees, reward and punishment, as well as administrative method (fa) in the hands of the ruler, representative of his own state's Shen Buhai. The latter he differentiates under the term Shu 术 administrative Method or Technique, defined here as examining the abilities of ministers, appointing candidates in accordance with their capabilities, holding ministerial achievements (xing "forms") accountable to their proposals (ming "names") as becoming titles and offices, and grasping fast the handles of life and death. Han Fei recommends following after rules and measures using Shu technique.

According to Liu Xiang (Pei Yin commentaries), Shen Buhai aimed at relying on supervision and accountability rather than punishment. Whereas Chapter 5 earlier recalls Shen Buhai alongside Laozi, a pairing of “performance and titles (proposals)” (xingming) with rewards and punishments corresponds more with the developments of the Han Feizi's Chapter 7 as the Two Handles (“Er bing” 二柄).

=== Chapter 30 techniques ===
Shu technique can be synonomyous with fa, but not all techniques are examples of fa. The Han Feizi lists seven techniques (shu 術) of rule in Chapter 30. Yuri Pines divides them in half, taking only the first four as resonating with Shen Buhai in the sense of "a series of bureaucratic devices aimed at monitoring the officials’ performance".

- First: survey and compare all the various views on a matter;
- Second: make punishments ineluctable and majestic authority clear;
- third: make rewards reliable and make people use their abilities to the full;
- fourth: listen to proposals one by one, and hold the subordinates responsible [for proposals];
- fifth: issue confusing edicts and make wily dispositions;
- sixth: keep your knowledge to yourself and ask advice;
- seventh: say the opposite of what you mean and do the opposite of what you intend.

(Han Feizi 30.0.0; Chen 2000: 560; [“Nei chushuo shang” 內儲說上])

=== Legal comparison ===
A legal and administrative use of fa (standards) by the ruler has been argued different mainly in that early religious Mohist's ideal was the universally beneficial sun, as an objective standard of comparison. Although dealing in questions of language, in addition to early supernatural elements, Mozi's concept was not simply an abstract standard, but implied measurement, and were often measurement-like standards, including the plumb-line and carpenters square. In this sense, although Mohism does promote following a virtuous ruler, the Mohist concept of the standard is not a freely determined law simply invented by the ruler. It implies and intends measurement against objective standards. But the Mohists also used standards in engineering and language, and many later Mohist engineers were not necessarily very religious, following the ideals of a pragmatic philosophy.

Although Shang Yang was criticized for harsh punishment, and have philosophical differences, his legal usage is at least arguably comparable in function to the Mohist usage, promulgating standards (laws) of comparison for people to follow. Xunzi's usage is arguably most different, arguing for the Confucian scholar as interpreter of standards. Shang Yang and Mozi's standards were intended to be understandable by common people. Shang Yang and Han Fei ultimately fall back on the ruler as an authority for determining standards, but Han Fei still intends the ruler try to make objective measurements, to protect him against factors like deceit. Han Fei's ruler may have different objects, but if he tries to make measurements to make objective standards, their concept of the standard can still functionally be compared to Mozi's at least in that sense. Its process is functionally different to the degree the standard is determined arbitrarily.

== See also ==
- Logic in China
- Legalism (Chinese philosophy)

== Sources ==
- Creel, Herrlee Glessner (September 15, 1982) [1970]. What Is Taoism?: And Other Studies in Chinese Cultural History. University of Chicago Press. ISBN 9780226120478. JSTOR 1397689. OCLC 1256745090 – via Google Books.
- Fraser, Chris (2011). Oxford Handbook of World Philosophy. Oxford University Press. ISBN 978-0-19-532899-8.
- Graham, A.C. (1989). Disputers of the Tao: Philosophical Argument in Ancient China. Open Court. ISBN 978-0-8126-9942-5.
- Goldin, Paul R. (2005). After Confucius: Studies In Early Chinese Philosophy. University of Hawai'i Press. ISBN 978-0-8248-2842-4.
  - Goldin, Paul R. (2005a), "Insidious Syncretism in the Political Philosophy of Huainanzi" (PDF), University of Hawai'i Press: 90–111
- Goldin, Paul R. (2011). "Persistent Misconceptions about Chinese "Legalism"". Journal of Chinese Philosophy. 38 (1): 88–104.
- Goldin, Paul R. (2012). Dao Companion to the Philosophy of Han Fei. Dao Companions to Chinese Philosophy. University of Pennsylvania: Springer. ISBN 978-0-19-760347-5.
  - Goldin, Paul R. (2013), Introduction: Han Fei and the Han Feizi. In: Dao Companion to the Philosophy of Han Fei (PDF), Springer, pp. 1–21, ISBN 978-9-400-74318-2 – via the University of Pennsylvania
- Hansen, Chad (1992). A Daoist Theory of Chinese Thought. Oxford: Oxford University Press. ISBN 978-0-19-535076-0.
- Kejian, Huang (2016). From Destiny to Dao. Davies Pacific Center: Enrich Professional Publishing. ISBN 978-1-62320-023-7.
- Jiang, Tao (2021). Origins of Moral-political Philosophy in Early China. Oxford: Oxford University Press. ISBN 978-0-19-760347-5.
- Makeham, John (1994). Name and Actuality in Early Chinese Thought. State University of New York Press. ISBN 978-1-4384-1174-3.
- Loewe, Michael (1986) [1978]. The Cambridge History of China, Vol. 1: The Ch'in and Han Empires, 221 BC-AD 220. Cambridge: Cambridge University Press. ISBN 978-0-521-24327-8.
- Pines, Yuri (2023). "Legalism in Chinese Philosophy". In Zalta, Edward N.; Nodelman, Uri (eds.). Stanford Encyclopedia of Philosophy (Summer 2023 ed.).
- Pines, Yuri (2024). Dao Companion to China's fa Tradition. Hebrew University of Jerusalem: Springer. ISBN 9789048129270.
  - Yu, Zhong. "On Shen Buhai's Legal Thought". In Pines (2024), pp. 57-82.
