= Anshi =

- Wang Anshi Chinese poet
- Zhang Anshi Chinese politician
