= Logic in China =

China is a special case in the history of logic, due to its relatively long isolation from the corresponding traditions that developed in Europe, India, and the Islamic world.

== Background: comparison with other traditions ==
Christoph Harbsmeier identifies the "only really productive period" for the native tradition of logic in China as spanning between the lifetimes of Confucius and Wang Chong – i.e. from c. 550 BC until c. AD 100. This largely coincides with the period during which the classics of Chinese literature were written; the style exemplified in these works is known as Classical Chinese. Almost all formal written Chinese from the Classical period until the early twentieth century consciously emulated this form of the language, in what is referred to as Literary Chinese. The native Chinese tradition did not conceive of a system of formal logic separable from language as otherwise written. Notably, syllogisms – arguments fundamental to classical Hellenistic and Indian logic, where a necessary conclusion is deduced from two propositions assumed to be true – are almost entirely absent from premodern Chinese writing.

There was no Chinese word with a meaning akin to Ancient Greek logĭkós prior to the modern period. As in many other languages, the modern Chinese word for "logic" (traditional Chinese: 邏輯; simplified Chinese: 逻辑; pinyin: luójí; lit. 'patrol-gather') is a loanword stemming ultimately from the Greek term. It was coined in 1902 by Yan Fu to correspond phonemically to the English word logic for his translation of A System of Logic by John Stuart Mill; its characters were not chosen via phono-semantic matching or as a purely semantic calque like some other Chinese translations of the term that appeared during the late nineteenth and early twentieth centuries.

== Mohist logic ==
Mozi (c. 470 – c. 391 BC), a near-contemporary of Confucius (c. 551 – c. 479 BC), is credited with founding the Mohist school, whose canons dealt with issues relating to valid inference and the conditions of correct conclusions. However, they were nonproductive and not integrated into Chinese science or mathematics. The Mohist school contained an approach to logic and argumentation that stresses rhetorical analogies over mathematical reasoning, and is based on the three fa, or methods of drawing distinctions between kinds of things. As classical Chinese philosophical logic was based on analogy rather than syllogism, fa were used as benchmarks to determine the validity of logical claims through comparison.

The School of Names, a school that grew out of Mohism, is credited by some scholars for their early investigation of formal logic.

== Taoist skepticism ==
Although Taoist skeptics such as Zhuang Zhou agreed with the Mohist perspective about object relations regarding similarities and differences, they did not consider language to be sufficiently precise to provide a constant guide of action.

== Official repression of the study of logic ==
During the Qin dynasty, the rule of Legalism repressed the Mohist line of investigation, which has been said to have disappeared in China until the introduction of Indian philosophy and Indian logic by Buddhists. A prominent scholar suggests that the version assembled for the Imperial Library of the Han dynasty would probably have been as disorganised as the current extant text, and thus would have only been 'intermittently intelligible', as it is for current readers who do not consult a critical edition. Disagreeing with Hajime Nakamura, A. C. Graham argues the school of Neo-Taoism maintained some interest in the Canons, although they may already have some of the terminology difficult to understand. Before the end of the Sui dynasty, a shortened version of Mozi appeared, which appears to have replaced the Han edition. Although the original Mozi had been preserved in the Taoist, and became known once more in the 1552 Lu edition and 1553 Tang edition, the damage was done: the dialectical chapters (as well as the military chapters) were considered incomprehensible. Nevertheless, with the rise of Chinese critical textual scholarship, the book benefited from explanatory and critical commentaries: first, by Bi Yuan, and his assistant, Sun Xingyan; another commentary by Wang Chong, which has not survived; "the first special study", by Zhang Huiyan; a republication of Part B by Wu Rulun. However, the summit of this late imperial scholarship, according to Graham, was the 'magnificent' commentary of Sun Yirang, which "threw open the sanctum of the Canons to all comers". Graham summarises the arduous textual history of the Canons by arguing that the Canons were neglected throughout most of China's history; but he attributes this fact to "bibliographical" accidents, rather than political repression, like Nakamura.

== Buddhist logic ==
The study of logic in China was revived following the transmission of Buddhism in China, which introduced the Buddhist logical tradition that began in Indian logic. Buddhist logic has been often misunderstood by scholars of Chinese Buddhism because they lack the necessary background in Indian logic.

== Western logic ==
In 1631, Li Zhizao and Francisco Furtado translated an abridged commentary on Aristotle, published through the University of Coimbra.

In 1886, Joseph Edkins published the Chinese translation of William Stanley Jevons's Elementary Lessons in Logic. In 1905, Yan Fu published the translation of John Stuart Mill's A System of Logic. In the early 1930s, the Department of Philosophy of Tsinghua University was the center of philosophical study. Many of the scholars at Tsinghua University at the time were strongly influenced by Bertrand Russell, who visited China in 1920.

Outside of the PRC, Hao Wang, a mathematical logician who was a close friend of Kurt Gödel, and Mou Zongsan, one of the New Confucian scholars and a translator of Ludwig Wittgenstein's Tractatus Logico-Philosophicus were active. Inside the country, dialectical logic was actively discussed during the Cultural Revolution, while formal logic stagnated. However, in 1979, after the Cultural Revolution, the Chinese Association of Logic was established with Jin Yuelin as the first chairman and studies of mathematical logic began.
