= Zhang Tang =

Chinese politician

Zhang Tang (traditional Chinese: 張湯; simplified Chinese: 张汤; pinyin: Zhāng Tāng; died c.December 116 BC) was a Chinese politician of the Western Han dynasty under Emperor Wu. He and his colleague, Gongsun Hong were Legalist bureaucrats.

== Background ==
Zhang Tang was a native of Du, the son of a deputy in Changan's city government. His father died before Zhang Tang became a minor official, but his mother, along with a number of younger brothers, outlived him. His son Zhang Ang was governor of Hanzhong. Another son, Zhang Anshi, was noted as having received a promotion after Zhang Tang's death.

In a legend, on one occasion in his youth, a rat stole a piece of meat while Zhang Tang was minding the house. As a result, he was whipped when his father returned home. Zhang Tang later caught the rat, beat out a confession and documented its crime, then held a trial and had the rat crucified. His actions were noticed by his father, who was amazed to find that the entire process had been carried out in the manner of an experienced prison official. Henceforth, he employed Zhang Tang in writing legal documents.

== Career ==
According to Sima Qian, after his father's death, Zhang Tang became a clerk in Chang'an and served as an aide to Ning Cheng in the office of the prefect of the capital. Later he earned a promotion to Mouling on the basis of Ning Cheng's recommendation, where he supervised the construction of Emperor Wu's mausoleum. During the early stages of his career, he had secret dealings with a number of Changan's wealthy merchants, although he discontinued such liaisons as he progressed to higher positions.

When Tian Sheng, the younger brother of the Empress Dowager, was arrested, Zhang Tang made every attempt to have him freed. Upon his release, Tian Sheng became friends with Zhang Tang and introduced him to members of the nobility. Later, his elder brother Tian Fen became chancellor and appointed Zhang Tang to be his secretary. He investigated sorcery allegations against Empress Chen, causing the downfall of both her and her faction. He gradually ascended through the ranks to palace counsellor.

Working with Zhao Yu, Zhang Tang increased the severity of the laws to prevent officials abusing their power. When dealing with those from prominent families, he had a habit of twisting the law to ensure that they were proven guilty, but often asked the Emperor for leniency in the cases of those from humble backgrounds, with the result that many in the latter category were spared. Amongst the prominent cases that he dealt with was that involving charges against the kings of Huainan, Hengshan and Jiangdu for planning rebellion. Later, Di Shan lambasted Zhang Tang to the Emperor for demonstrating false loyalty, citing his exceedingly forceful application of the law in dealing with the kings in this case as being a source of friction between the Emperor and his kin. Two men of high rank - Zhuang Zhu and Wu Bei - were also implicated in this crime, and despite the Emperor's initial objections, Zhang Tang managed to persuade him that the men ought to be executed. As a result of his successful prosecution of high officials, Zhang Tang won much merit. Ultimately, he reached the rank of imperial secretary, and at one stage, he became so influential that all matters of state were decided upon by him, with the chancellor relegated to the status of a mere figurehead.

When someone wrote to the Emperor to suggest that the Bao and Ye rivers be joined by a road to facilitate grain transport, Zhang Tang assessed the proposal, recommending that the road should be built and that the two rivers should be dredged. The Emperor adopted this and appointed Zhang Tang's son Zhang Ang to the post of governor of Hanzhong in order to supervise the work. Around 121 BC, a combination of foreign military operations and domestic disaster from flood and drought left the government treasury empty. Under the direction of the Emperor, Zhang Tang arranged for the minting of new currency and the nationalisation of the salt and iron industries, which had hitherto been in the hands of wealthy merchants. He also created a law to allow for the confiscation of the property of anyone who attempted to avoid the suan tax, with the result that he was able to destroy powerful families and landowners by a crafty application of the law. However, the populace remained discontented while government policies to alleviate their plight were being taken advantage of by unscrupulous officials for personal gain before they could take effect. Zhang Tang therefore made legal punishments harsher to prevent such corrupt behaviour. As a result of this, he became a target of blame by everyone from the highest officials down.

Zhang Tang was deceitful in nature and used his intelligence to take advantage of others, sometimes displaying outward admiration for men that he privately had little fondness for. Through his habit of paying calls on others even in the face of inclement weather, he was able to win widespread fame in spite of the severity and questionable objectivity of his legal work. After becoming a high official, Zhang Tang often looked after the interests of various relations of his old friends, treating them with great generosity. He regularly recommended to the Emperor the officials working under him, attributing the credit to one of them if the Emperor praised his handling of a case or accepting personal responsibility if the judgement was criticised and noting that he himself had foolishly rejected the advice of some subordinate who had expressed similar sentiments as the Emperor. In his dealings with the Emperor, Zhang Tang was careful to note his wishes, making use of classics such as the Book of Documents to back up decisions when the Emperor demonstrated interest in literary learning and assigning accused men to be handled by severe or lenient secretaries depending on whether he perceived the Emperor to want the men convicted or released. At the height of his career, he garnered such respect that his discourses on fiscal policy would receive the Emperor's undivided attention and on one occasion was the recipient of a personal visit by the Emperor to his sickbed.

== Downfall and death ==
A man named Li Wen, who bore a grudge against Zhang Tang, became an assistant in the office of the imperial secretary. Making use of the documents that passed through his hands there, he took every opportunity to make public any detail that reflected poorly on Zhang Tang and moreover ensured that he was held to account for them. Lu Yeju, a favourite secretary of Zhang Tang, got someone to report to the Emperor that Li Wen was engaged in rebellious and evil affairs. Zhang Tang was put in charge of the case and sentenced Li Wen to death. Despite knowing that the charges had been trumped up by Lu Yeju, Zhang Tang nevertheless pleaded ignorance when asked by the Emperor on who he thought to be responsible for bringing forth this accusation, responding by saying that it was probably the work of some old enemy of Li Wen's.

Not long afterwards, Lu Yeju was taken ill, and Zhang Tang personally visited his bedside and massaged his legs for him. The King of Zhao had reason to hate both men, given that the charges that he had brought against central government officials had always been dismissed by Zhang Tang and as he had himself been the subject of charges drawn up by Lu Yeju. He suggested to the Emperor that the fact that an official as high-ranking as Zhang Tang had visited and even massaged his secretary's legs was a sign that the two were engaged in planning some great crime. While these charges were being investigated, Lu Yeju died, but his brother became embroiled in the scandal and was arrested. It so happened that on one occasion, Zhang Tang was interviewing another prisoner held at the same place but pretended not to recognise Lu Yeju's brother as he hoped to use underhanded means to assist him. However, the latter was oblivious to these intentions and resented being ignored, so he revealed to the throne that Zhang Tang and Lu Yeju had been responsible for the false charges against Li Wen. Jian Xuan, an enemy of Zhang Tang, was tasked with investigating these allegations.

Around the same time, Emperor Wen's mausoleum was broken into and money offerings buried there were stolen. Zhang Tang made an agreement with Qing Di, the chancellor, that they would offer a joint apology to the Emperor for the crime, but when they appeared before him, Zhang Tang pointed out that he had no reason to apologise as the inspection of funerary parks was solely within the domain of the chancellor's duties, and thus Qing Di alone offered his apologies. Zhang Tang was tasked with the investigation afterwards and made such an attempt to prove that Qing Di had intentionally neglected to report the incident that the latter felt threatened. His chief secretaries - Zhu Maichen (a former associate of the Zhuang Zhu whose execution Zhang Tang had effected), Wang Chao and Bian Tong - informed him that Zhang Tang's actions were motivated by his ambition of replacing Qing Di as chancellor. All three detested Zhang Tang, as they were all former high-ranking officials and resented having now to treat him with reverence, and so they plotted together to bring about his downfall. They arrested a number of his merchant friends, amongst whom Tian Xin admitted that he had received insider knowledge whenever Zhang Tang was about to submit a proposal to the Emperor, thereby allowing him to hoard goods and make large profits that he would then share with Zhang Tang.

When the report of Jian Xuan's investigation was submitted, the findings convinced the Emperor that he had been swindled in front of his very eyes. However, Zhang Tang denied all the claims and refused to admit any guilt when envoys were sent to present him with the charges. The Emperor subsequently dispatched Zhao Yu, who Zhang Tang treated as an elder brother, to see him. Zhao Yu berated Zhang Tang, saying that he ought to understand his own situation given that he had inflicted it upon so many others, and that the Emperor did not want to haul him off to prison but rather hoped that he would end his own life. Thus convinced, Zhang Tang penned a letter apologising for his failures and accusing the chancellor's three chief secretaries of causing his ruin, then committed suicide. After his death, it was found that his wealth amounted to no more than 500 pieces of gold, attributable to either his salary or to gifts that he had received from the Emperor.

Despite his brothers' and sons' wish for an extravagant funeral, his mother objected on the basis that his negative reputation did not warrant one, and so he was taken to the cemetery in an ox cart and buried without an outer coffin. Later, the chancellor's three secretaries were charged and executed, while Qing Di himself also committed suicide. The Emperor, feeling regret for Zhang Tang's fate, gave his son Zhang Anshi a promotion to a higher government position.

== See also ==
- Empress Chen Jiao
- Liu Che
