= 119 BC =

119 BC in various calendars
- Gregorian calendar: 119 BC; CXIX BC
- Ab urbe condita: 635
- Ancient Egypt era: XXXIII dynasty, 205
- Pharaoh: Ptolemy VIII Physcon, 27
- Ancient Greek Olympiad (summer): 165th Olympiad, year 2
- Assyrian calendar: 4632
- Balinese saka calendar: N/A
- Bengali calendar: −712 – −711
- Berber calendar: 832
- Buddhist calendar: 426
- Burmese calendar: −756
- Byzantine calendar: 5390–5391
- Chinese calendar: 辛酉年 (Metal Rooster); 2579 or 2372 — to — 壬戌年 (Water Dog); 2580 or 2373
- Coptic calendar: −402 – −401
- Discordian calendar: 1048
- Ethiopian calendar: −126 – −125
- Hebrew calendar: 3642–3643
- Hindu calendars
- Vikram Samvat: −62 – −61
- Shaka Samvat: N/A
- Kali Yuga: 2982–2983
- Holocene calendar: 9882
- Iranian calendar: 740 BP – 739 BP
- Islamic calendar: 763 BH – 762 BH
- Javanese calendar: N/A
- Julian calendar: N/A
- Korean calendar: 2215
- Minguo calendar: 2030 before ROC 民前2030年
- Nanakshahi calendar: −1586
- Seleucid era: 193/194 AG
- Thai solar calendar: 424–425
- Tibetan calendar: ལྕགས་མོ་བྱ་ལོ་ (female Iron-Bird); 8 or −373 or −1145 — to — ཆུ་ཕོ་ཁྱི་ལོ་ (male Water-Dog); 9 or −372 or −1144

Year 119 BC was a year of the pre-Julian Roman calendar. At the time it was known as the Year of the Consulship of Dalmaticus and Cotta (or, less frequently, year 635 Ab urbe condita) and the Fourth Year of Yuanshou. The denomination 119 BC for this year has been used since the early medieval period, when the Anno Domini calendar era became the prevalent method in Europe for naming years.

== Events ==
=== By place ===
==== Roman Republic ====
- The second Dalmatian war begins.

==== China ====
- Spring: Han Chinese forces under the General-in-Chief Wei Qing and the cavalry general Huo Qubing invade the Xiongnu Empire.

- Battle of Mobei: Wei Qing crosses the Gobi Desert, defeats Yizhixie Chanyu and kills or captures 19,000 Xiongnu.
- Huo Qubing crosses the eastern Gobi, defeats and executes Bijuqi, defeats the Tuqi (Worthy Prince) of the Left (East), and captures three kings. He reaches as far as Lake Baikal.
- Failing to reconnoiter with Wei Qing's army, general Li Guang commits suicide after learning that Wei has prepared charges against him.
- Emperor Wu creates the rank of Grand Marshal and gives it to both Wei Qing and Huo Qubing, thereby making Huo's rank and salary equal to that of Wei.

- Emperor Wu suspends further campaigning against the Xiongnu due to a shortage of horses.
- Government monopolies are established in iron, salt and liquor.

== Deaths ==
- Di Shan, Chinese politician of the Han dynasty
- Li Guang, Chinese general of the Han dynasty
