= Gongsun Hong =

Chinese philosopher and politician (200–121 BCE)

Gongsun Hong (公孫弘; Wade–Giles: Kung-sun Hung; 200 – 7 April 121 BCE) was a senior official in the Western Han dynasty under Emperor Wu. Together with the more famous Confucian scholar Dong Zhongshu, Gongsun was one of the earliest proponents of Confucianism, setting in motion its emergence under the Han court. The ideals and decrees both promoted would come to be seen as values-in-themselves, becoming the "basic elements, or even hallmarks" of Confucianism, although not necessarily officially during his lifetime. While first proposed and more ardently promoted by Dong, the national academy and Imperial examination, then considered radical, did not come into existence until they were supported by the more successful Gongsun. Their establishment set a precedent that would last into the twentieth century.

Gongsun was born in Zichuan within the Kingdom of Lu, part of present-day Shandong province. Beginning his political career at age sixty, he rapidly advanced from commoner to attain a senior appointment in 130BC when he was seventy, becoming grand secretary and 'censor-in-chief' in 126, and chancellor in 124. One of the Three Dukes, in recognition of canonical mastery he was probably the first Han Confucian to be appointed to high office, the first commoner and first (and only, out of twelve of the time) Confucian to be made chancellor, as well as the first chancellor to be made marquis. He set a precedent for Confucianism as interpreter of portents.

The Book of Han listed a work called Gongsun Hong. According to the Xijing Zaji, he was the author of the Gong-Sun Zi, a work on Xing-Ming. With one passage quoted by the Taiping Yulan, the work was likely still extant in the tenth century but is now lost.

== Background ==
Preceding emperors, being more aligned with Huang-Lao, had instituted a policy of general non-interference with the people, reducing tax and other burdens, promoting government thrift and reducing criminal sentences. A major issue however was the power of collateral princes within the imperial clan, who often built up their own military strengths, resisting edicts issued by the emperor. Emperor Wen's time saw the Lü Clan Disturbance, but he did not take any decisive, overarching action. His successor Emperor Jing managed to crush a revolt of the princes, who were thereafter denied rights to appoint ministers for their fiefs, but their power persisted.

Sima Qian states Gongsun's background as that of a prison officer, who being dismissed, made his living as a farmhand tending pigs. The Shiji characterizes both Gongsun and Dong Zhongshu as specializing in the Spring and Autumn Annals, giving Gongsun a primary interest in the Chunqiu Guliang Biography as a commentary on the annals. The Shiji and Hanshu otherwise attribute to him a bent toward the Gongyang Zhuan commentaries, as a disciple of Huwu Zidu, reportedly attending an instruction on the Gongyang under him in the Qi state, when Huwu himself was old. In contrast to the Shiji, the Hanshu takes him as more interested in the Gongyang.

However, neither text is referenced in any of Gongsun's documents, and his actions don't seem to reflect the Gongyang. His family being poor, he did not learn much of the Annals until he was forty, and the Shiji considers his ability secondary to that of Dong Zhongshu. Although Gongsun discussed the finer points of the Mandate of Heaven with the Emperor, he espoused that heaven was not partial towards its servants.

== Appointment speech in the Shiji ==
Gongsun probably first expressed his views in 134 B.C. after the death of the Daoistic Empress Dowager, in response to a request by the Emperor Wu of Han for governmental advice. He applied to an advanced position in government through court examination. His discourse included ideas from Confucianism, administrative philosophy (Chinese Legalism) and Mohism; namely, that capable people ought to be employed in positions that match their talents (Shen Buhai and Han Fei); secondly, encouraging high standards of morality, harmonious relationships, and employing moral persons (Both Confucianism and Mohism advocate this); and that common people should be allowed opportunity for farming while discouraging useless articles (Mohism and Shang Yang).

Referring to a typical golden age of the remote past in which the populace was naturally good, reminiscent of Lu Jia and Jia Yi, Gongsun's speech to the court derides the practice of the Qin (that is, its penalties) as inadequate, stressing the Confucian values of sincerity, humaneness (ren), righteousness (yi), and moderation (li), but also intellectual judgement (zhi) as the means of effective authority. In what may have been the first time in history he evoked the Duke of Zhou (Zhou Gong) in his argument. As an influence on the basics of Confucianism, his stress on guidance through music (which Dong also stressed), li, and the habits of living is notable, while on the other hand he lacked Dong's cosmology.

Following this Sima Qian portrays him as giving a thinly veiled discourse on the "fundamentals of government" drawn seemingly straight from the Han Feizi (see Chapter 43), referring to the techniques (Shu) of government (associated with Shen Buhai): recommending firm personal control of the government, and "monopolization of the handles which control life" (Han Feizi's Chapter 7 The Two Handles, including a doctrine of reward and punishment like Shang Yang). His discourse was rated low by the Ceremonial Superintendent, but among the top by the Emperor; though it may have been simple compared with Dong's, Sima Qian writes that it was still very elegant.

== Xiongnu Envoy and Imperial academy ==
According to Sima Qian, beginning his diplomatic career at age sixty, Gongsun was sent as an envoy to the Xiongnu (northern nomadic confederation). He resigned "because of illness" when his opinion on the matter differed from that of (Emperor Wu), but was brought back on general consensus despite Gongsun's reluctance. Thereafter he rarely disagreed with the emperor openly. At first arguing against it, he argued for Zhufu Yan's proposal for the development of the Shuofang commandery (a defensive position against the Xiongnu) at the expense of efforts to the south, only eventually succeeding.

As memorialized in Sima Qian's The Collected Biographies of Ru (which he did not necessarily write himself), Gongsun Hong recommended that highly talented young men be selected to train at an imperial academy. They would be assigned to entry-level positions based on their study of the Five Classics. Sima Qian more generally would appear to despise Gongsun, regarding the Confucians following him into office sarcastically. Despite this, the document states that one then found literate and refined men within the bureaucracy.

However, although they would find themselves to a variety of posts during the reign of Emperor Wu, the document itself would appear idealist, with the hope that they could become rich based on their studies. Their ascent would not appear to have been easy, with only two high-ranking officials from the academy on record by name. The Confucians themselves still disadvantaged, most high officials at the time still inherited their posts. Future Confucians would retroactively reconstruct the Confucian community as having flourished under Emperor Wu's reign.

== Zhang Tang collaboration ==
Having begun his career as a scholar appointed for his knowledge of the Five Classics, and only later arriving at the legal, Gongsun would embellish the later with the former, greatly pleasing the emperor. Often mentioned together in the Shiji, Gongsun sang the praises of legal clerk Zhang Tang, whose policies needed legitimation, thereby strengthening each other's positions. Professor Griet Vankeerberghen refers to both Gongsun and Zhang as "quasi-Legalist bureaucrats". They instituted a law along the lines of Shang Yang that punished those with knowledge of a crime that failed to report it, or slandered prosecutors. According to the Taiping Yulan, Gongsun also wrote a highly valuable book on Xing-Ming (personnel selection), a doctrine of Shen Buhai and Han Fei, that may have been extant as late as the tenth century.

Servicing the emperor's wishes, they brought the government under tight central control, promoting an autocratic style of government. Eliminating their enemies through execution or transfer, they began what may be termed a political revolution putting a temporary end to group interests in the court, consolidating it with the death of Liu An in Huainan. The demotion of their enemy Ji An is notable, as a powerful representative of the Huang-Lao tradition favouring rich families. Drawing them as infringing on the Emperor's prerogatives and authority, Gongsun implies a comparison between the luxurious indulgence of Ji An's ilk to that of Guan Zhong as usurping the prerogatives of his lord – and is approved. In connection with this Gongsun wore plain clothes and ate plain food, as if to place himself on footing with minor officials or the people.

Other cases include Gongsun recommending the corrupt Zhufu Yan for execution (though Gongsun may have been covetous of his favour with the Emperor), and that the harsh official Ning Cheng not be appointed to government office, with the emperor making the latter commandant. Gongsun died of natural causes only a year after the Huainan trials. His son inherited his rank, becoming Grand Administrator of Zhejiang, but lost it in a trial. Sima Qian states that he was replaced by Li Ts'ai.

== Dong Zhongshu ==
While Dong Zhongshu did not attain high office, the Hanshu records state that his career was still distinguished through the same call to service as Gongsun Hong. In the legendarium of the Hanshu, collecting Dong's interpretation of Confucian texts from the very beginning of his employment, despite banishing him, Gongsun is said to have preferred his teachings to that of a now largely unknown Scholar Jiang of Xiaqiu.

Gongsun's speech acquired him the title of academician, leading Dong to claims that he attained high office from the autocratic Emperor through flattery, for which Gongsun would be characterized as "hating" him. Gongsun is said to have tried hard to sideline Dong, and would ultimately see his banishing, probably between 126-121BC, with the statement that he was the only person suited to be chancellor of Jiaoxi. Ban Gu, as representative of the Hanshu, repeatedly asserts Gongsun as responsible for Dong's banishment to Jiaoxi, as well as the death of Zhufu Yan.

Greatly admired by Liu Xiang, Dong had general interest in the problems of government, including taxes, agriculture and the Xiongnu. However, he would later face the death penalty, from which he was reprieved, so that he could only serve in an advisory role. Despite his Confucian legacy, he was not considered an intellectual leader even into the era of the Qing dynasty. Michael Loewe notes a considerable lapse of time between Dong's proposals and their implementation. Thus, although Gongsun himself 'unofficially' banished Dong, there is little to suppose his policy suggestions as repeated by his contemporaries, or otherwise adopted, except where Gongsun himself promoted them.

By making Dong chancellor of Weifang, Gongsun effectively prompted Dong's partial retirement from political life, but would seem to have paved the way for an appropriation and replacement of his proposals with more elaborate ones. Dong's proposals for training officials were only followed through due to Gongsun. Dong was responsible for some recruitment into the bureaucracy, but was not very successful at it. His efforts would be overtaken by Gongsun, but can be credited for initial input in decrees and ideals that would become the "basic elements or hallmarks" of Confucianism.

== Legacy ==
Contrary to Zhang Tang, who promoted his subordinates, Gongsun made no use of his position to advance other Confucians, and likely did not identify with the Confucian community, not hesitating to drive them from office. Michael Loewe states that, though regarded as one of the most respected statesmen, he was actually considered somewhat old-fashioned. Despite his political orientation, because he insisted on the value of trust over either law, rewards or penalties, Professor Griet Vankeerberghen considers Gongsun still reminiscent of Huang-Lao ideology like that of the Daoistic Huainanzi, the book of his opponents.

Although not speaking particularly negatively of him, Sinologist Herrlee G. Creel considered him largely a figurehead Confucian for the justification of Emperor Wu's despotic rule, Gongsun being a "good deal 'Legalist'" himself; the men Wu actually listened to were in finance, criminal law, military affairs etc. However, Vankeerberghen considers Gongsun to have promoted the virtues of frugality, modesty and incorruptibility, which might be said to have faded into the background. Pledging allegiance to the Emperor, he was innovative in defining absolutism in moral terms, espousing a conception of loyalty at odds with the times, and new standards of conduct to go with it. Following Gongsun, scholars "took to supporting monarchical power", he and Zhang Tang achieving "nothing less than a tilting of the axis of the conventional moral compass toward a more legal-centric orientation."

Before Gongsun the selection of officials depended mainly on the judgment of senior officials, and the injunctions of the Emperor, though still referencing character. Only seven percent of officials at the time were Confucian. Gongsun's rapid rise would be celebrated as its success, but apart from attracting opportunists to Confucianism, also saw the ideas of "Chinese Legalism" work their way into Confucianism, and those espousing "Legalist" policies counted among their ranks.

Many were willing to follow Gongsun, while notable contemporaries like Dong Zhongshu, Ji An and historiographer Sima Qian called him and Zhang Tang flatterers and deceitful hypocrites, Gongsun receiving high salary while wearing simple clothes, and appearing lenient while inwardly uncompromising ("a suspicious man, outwardly magnanimous but inwardly scheming... he pretended to be friendly but repaid all wrongs" -Sima Qian), and accused him of subverting Confucianism. If nothing else, Gongsun could easily be said to have manipulated the legal system, and generally, did not openly state his own opinion in court (though these could hardly be considered particular to him).

Whatever the case, both lived frugal, if not charitable lives and established new standards of conduct. Though utilizing his virtues to further his career, Gongsun was said to be proficient, meticulous, yielding and filial. He was praised for giving away, at times, most of his salary to fellow scholars, to the point of having little left over for his family, only revealing this to the court at the charge of Ji An. After failing to suppress the rebellion in Huainan due to illness he accepted Ji An's criticism of hypocrisy.

While Sima states that Gongsun considered himself to have died without achieving merit, Later Han historian Ban Gu considered him to have outstanding ability. Sinologist Homer H. Dubs considered him "admirable in personal conduct, able in disputation, capable in legal matters, and an ornament to scholarship", while Tu Weiming called him and Dong the heirs of Shusun Tong.
