= Zhufu Yan =

Chinese politician

Zhufu Yan (主父偃; died 127 or 126 BCE) was a Chinese politician who served as a high-ranking court official and advisor to Emperor Wu of Han. He proposed the Tui'en Ling (推恩令 'Order to Expand Favours'), a decree that was meant to weaken the power of the feudal lords in China. The policy encouraged them to divide their territories among all their sons rather than pass their lands onto just the eldest son. The resulting fragmentation of the feudal lords' estates reduced their influence, making them less of a threat to the Emperor.

== Life ==
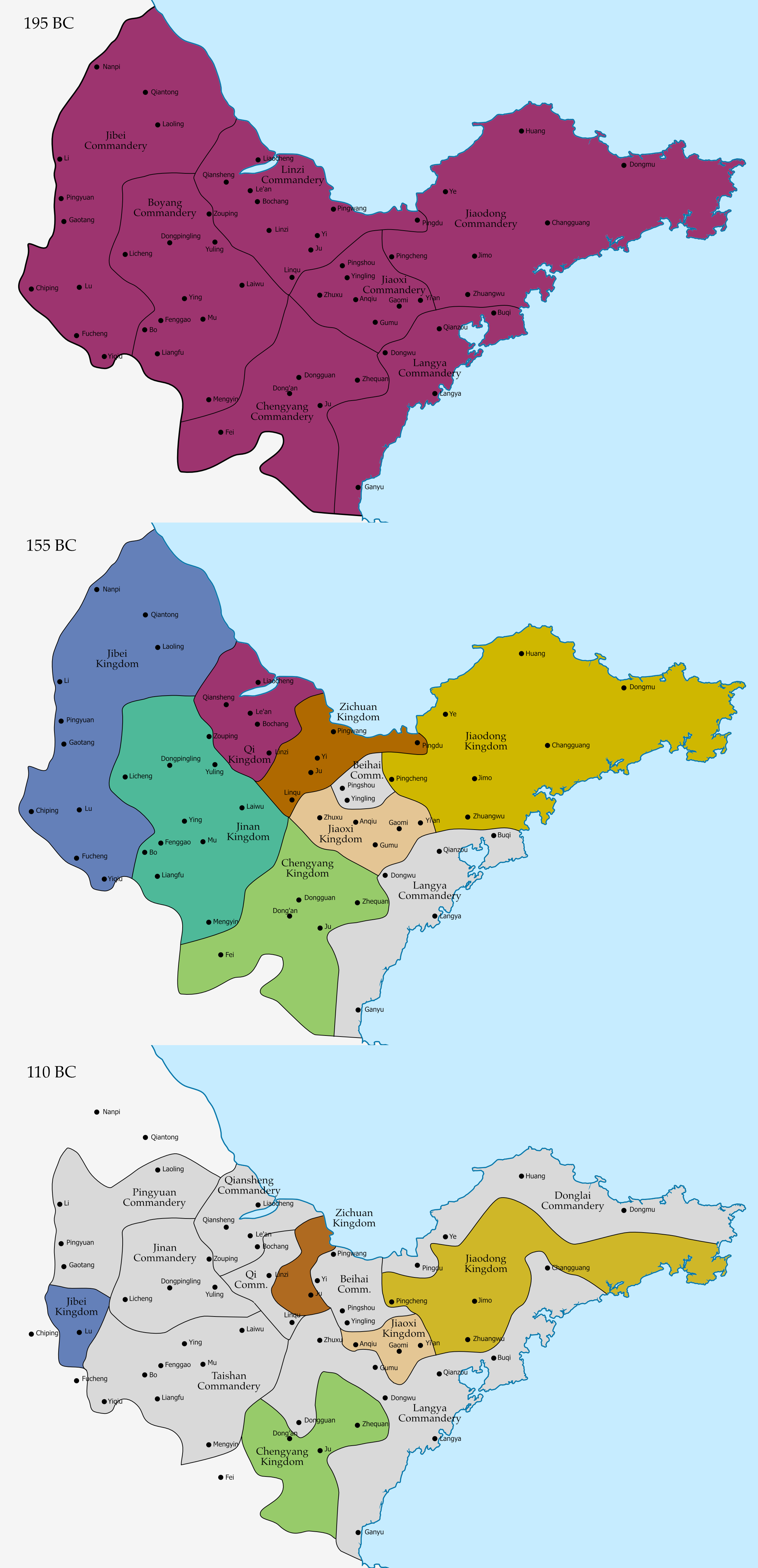
Map of changes in the territorial boundaries of commanderies and kingdoms in the Qi region (today's Shandong province) during the early Han dynasty. After Emperor Wu's "Order to Expand Favours", the territories of the kingdoms were greatly reduced and lands turned into direct control of the central government

Zhufu Yan was born into a poor family in Linzi, Qi Kingdom (now Linzi District, Shandong), Zhufu began his studies with the School of Diplomacy and did not study Taoist and Confucian texts until later. In 134 BC, Zhufu Yan entered the capital and met Wei Qing. On Wei Qing's recommendation, he was not initially employed by Emperor Wu of Han. Together with Xu Le (徐樂) and Yan An (嚴安), he submitted memorials discussing current affairs. When the memorials were presented, Emperor Wu summoned the three men and said, "Where have you all been? Why have I met you so late?" Thereupon, all three were appointed Gentlemen of the Palace (langzhong). Zhufu Yan repeatedly submitted memorials on political matters and was successively promoted to Remonstrant (yezhe), Gentleman-in-Attendance, and Court Gentleman (zhong dafu)—advancing four ranks within a single year.

In order to strengthen imperial autocratic power, Emperor Wu of Han, in addition to the outer court bureaucracy headed by the Chancellor, established an Inner Court within the palace. Zhufu Yan served as an adviser to Emperor Wu in the Inner Court and exercised considerable political influence. Several of his memorials directly addressed pressing abuses of the time. Emperor Wu adopted Zhufu Yan's "Order to Expand Favors" (推恩令), which required princes to divide their domains among their sons as marquises, thereby fragmenting princely territories and greatly weakening the power of the feudal lords.

Because Zhufu Yan enjoyed great favor with Emperor Wu, officials at court and in the provinces feared that he might slander them before the emperor, and thus many sought to bribe him, "with gifts amounting to nearly a thousand gold." Some criticized him as "excessively overbearing." Upon hearing this, Zhufu Yan smugly quoted a saying attributed to Wu Zixu, declaring: "I am old and exhausted, yet my ambitions remain unfulfilled—thus I can only act perversely." He explained further: "At fifteen I bound up my hair and went out to study; for more than forty years I achieved nothing. My parents disowned me, my brothers refused me, and my guests abandoned me. I have long suffered misfortune. And if a great man cannot enjoy the five-cauldron feast in life, he might as well die by being boiled in the five cauldrons."

At the time, Emperor Wu's half-sister Jin Su, titled Lady Xiucheng (修成君), was greatly favored by Empress Dowager Wang. Lady Xiucheng had a daughter named E (娥). The Empress Dowager wished to marry E to a feudal king. A eunuch close to her, Xu Jia (徐甲), a native of Qi, requested permission to travel as an envoy to Qi and have the King of Qi, Liu Cichang, submit a memorial requesting E as his queen. The Empress Dowager was pleased and dispatched Xu Jia to Qi. Upon learning of this, Zhufu Yan seized the opportunity and asked Xu Jia to recommend that his own daughter also be admitted into the King of Qi's harem.

When Xu Jia conveyed this to Empress Dowager Ji, mother of the King of Qi, she became enraged and declared: "The king already has a queen, and the harem is fully established. You, Xu Jia, are a poor man of Qi who became a eunuch and serves the Han court, yet you have contributed nothing to the court—and now you dare to come disturb the Qi royal household! And what sort of figure is Zhufu Yan, that he should also wish to place his daughter in our harem?" Xu Jia returned to the Han court and reported to the Empress Dowager: "The King of Qi is willing to marry E as his queen, but he fears meeting the same fate as the King of Yan." Xu Jia mentioned the King of Yan because Liu Dingguo (劉定國), King of Yan, had recently been executed and his kingdom abolished for committing incest with his daughter and sister, and the King of Qi was indeed rumored to have engaged in incest with his own sister. The Empress Dowager was angered by this and abandoned the plan to marry E into Qi.

Zhufu Yan thus became estranged from Qi and, taking advantage of imperial favor, accused the King of Qi of incest. Emperor Wu appointed Zhufu Yan as Chancellor of Qi to investigate the matter. The King of Qi, fearing punishment, committed suicide by poison. Enraged, Emperor Wu abolished the Kingdom of Qi.

The King of Zhao, Liu Pengzu (劉彭祖), had long been on bad terms with Zhufu Yan. Fearing retaliation, the King of Zhao struck first and accused Zhufu Yan of driving the King of Qi to suicide and of accepting bribes from various feudal kings. Emperor Wu was furious and ordered Jian Xuan to conduct a thorough investigation. The Chancellor Gongsun Hong argued: "The King of Qi died fearing his crimes and left no heir, and his territory has already been annexed by the court. If Zhufu Yan is not executed, there will be no way to answer the resentment of the people throughout the realm." Consequently, Zhufu Yan was executed along with his entire clan.

He once manipulated Zhu Maichen into accepting a proposal made by Gongsun Hong, but Gongsun was able to convince the Emperor to execute Zhufu Yan for bribery.
