= Ning Cheng =

Ning Cheng 寧程
- Born: Unknown; Dengzhou, Henan
- Died: Unknown
- Occupation: Politician

Ning Cheng (fl. 2nd and 1st centuries BC) was a Chinese politician of the western Han dynasty under Emperors Jing and Wu. He was known for his harsh application of the law, such that officials travelling to and from his area of governance would say to each other "Better to face a nursing tigress than the wrath of Ning Cheng!"

== Life ==
Ning Cheng initially served under Emperor Jing as a palace attendant and master of guests. He employed dishonest means to reach positions of power, eventually being appointed as chief commandant of Jinan. His predecessors in the post had all approached Zhi Du, the governor of Jinan, as though they were mere county officials owing to their fear of him, but Ning Cheng considered him an equal and sought to outdo him. Having known Ning Cheng by reputation, Zhi Du befriended him. Years later, after Zhi Du's death, Emperor Jing appointed Ning Cheng as a military commander in Changan in order to stymie the large number of crimes committed by imperial relatives. Ning Cheng emulated Zhi Du's style of governance and soon became an object of fear to everyone in the imperial family.

Upon Emperor Wu's accession to the throne, he made Ning Cheng prefect of the capital. However, the emperor's in-laws took every opportunity to slander Ning Cheng, ultimately resulting in his conviction. Despite it being customary for high officials of the time to commit suicide when charged with a capital offence, Ning Cheng submitted to even the most severe of punishments. Eventually, he escaped and made his way home, forging papers in order to get through the pass.

Declaring that "An official who can't advance to a salary of 2,000 piculs or a merchant who can't make at least 10,000,000 cash is not fit to be called a man!", Ning Cheng borrowed money and bought over 1,000 qing (equivalent to about 600 million square feet) of farmland on which he employed several thousand poor families to work. By the time a general amnesty was declared years later, he had amassed several thousand pieces of gold and exerted more power over the populace than the governor of the region did. Later, Emperor Wu took him out of retirement and made him chief commandant of Hangu Pass after Gongsun Hong's protests that he was like a "wolf driving a flock of sheep" had prevented Ning Cheng from becoming a provincial governor.

When Yi Zong was travelling from Henei to Nanyang to take up a post of governor at the latter, Ning Cheng had retired again and was living in Nanyang. Despite meeting Yi Zong at the pass and escorting him on his way, Ning Cheng's courtesy was not reciprocated. Instead, Yi Zong pressed charges against the Ning family forthwith and utterly demolished their homes. As a result, Ning Cheng was convicted of an offence.
