= Di Shan =

Chinese politician

Di Shan (Chinese: 狄山; pinyin: Dí Shān; Wade–Giles: Ti Shan, d. 119 BC) was an erudite in the court of Emperor Wu of the western Han dynasty. He was killed by a Xiongnu attack.

When the Xiongnu sought an alliance and the matter was being discussed by various officials, Di Shan declared that he was in favour of peace. Asked to elaborate by the emperor, he criticised the impact of war on resources and the standard of living of those near the border. He cited the examples of both internal and external conflicts under past reigns and juxtaposed the hardship of these times with the prosperity enjoyed during times of peace. Zhang Tang, when consulted on his opinion, dismissed Di Shan as a "stupid Confucianist" with no understanding of the matter. Di Shan responded by admitting that his loyalty was the "loyalty of the stupid" but then accused Zhang Tang of being dishonest in his loyalty, using as evidence the latter's forceful prosecution of the kings of Huainan and Jiangdu.

Emperor Wu then asked Di Shan whether he could keep out the Xiongnu if made a governor of a province. When the latter responded by saying he could not, the emperor proposed that he be made magistrate of a district, an offer that he similarly rebuffed. However, Di Shan finally relented when offered the position of commander of a guard post, afraid that he would be handed over for trial if he refused. Within a little over a month, Di Shan had been decapitated following a Xiongnu raid on his guard post.
