= Mozi =

Chinese philosopher and logician (c. 470 – c. 391 BCE)

Mozi 墨子
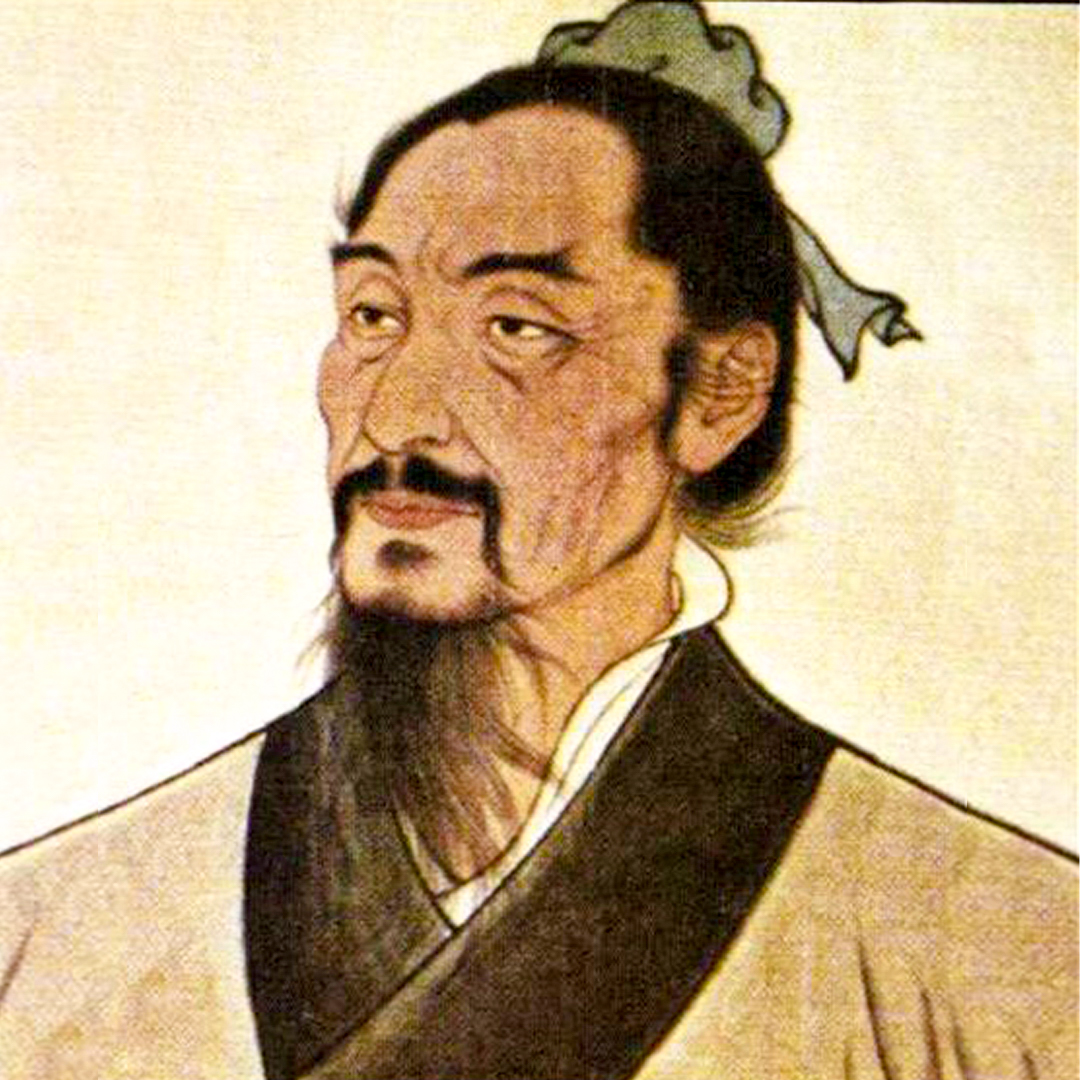
- Born: c. 470 BCE; Lu, Zhou dynasty (present-day Tengzhou, Shandong)
- Died: c. 391 BCE (aged 79)

Philosophical work
- Era: Ancient philosophy
- Region: Chinese philosophy
- School: Mohism
- Main interests: Ethics, social and political philosophy, logic, epistemology

Mozi
- "Mozi" in seal script (top) and regular script (bottom) characters
- Chinese: 墨子
- Literal meaning: Master Mo
Transcriptions
Standard Mandarin
- Hanyu Pinyin: Mòzǐ
- Bopomofo: ㄇㄛˋ ㄗˇ
- Gwoyeu Romatzyh: Mohtzy
- Wade–Giles: Mo^{4}-tzu^{3}
- Tongyong Pinyin: Mò-zǐh
- IPA: [mwô.tsɹ̩̀]
Wu
- Suzhounese: Meq^{8}-tsy^{3}
Yue: Cantonese
- Yale Romanization: Mahk-jí
- Jyutping: Mak6 zi2
- IPA: [mɐk̚˨ tsi˧˥]
Southern Min
- Tâi-lô: Ba̍k-tsú
Middle Chinese
- Middle Chinese: Mok-tsí
Old Chinese
- Baxter–Sagart (2014): *C.mˤak tseʔ

Personal name
- Chinese: 墨翟
Transcriptions
Standard Mandarin
- Hanyu Pinyin: Mò Dí
- Bopomofo: ㄇㄛˋ ㄉㄧˊ
- Wade–Giles: Mo^{4} Ti^{2}
- Tongyong Pinyin: Mò Dí
- IPA: [mwô.tǐ]
Yue: Cantonese
- Yale Romanization: Mahk Dihk
- Jyutping: Mak6 dik6
- IPA: [mɐk̚˨ tɪk̚˨]
Southern Min
- Hokkien POJ: Ba̍k Ti̍k
Middle Chinese
- Middle Chinese: Mok Dek
Old Chinese
- Baxter–Sagart (2014): *C.mˤak Lˤewk

Mozi, (Note: /ˈmoʊˈtsiː/; /ˈmoʊˈtsuː/ Rarely Latinized as Micius.) personal name Mo Di, (Note: In this Chinese name, the family name is Mo.) was a Chinese philosopher, logician, and the founder of the Mohist school of thought, making him one of the most important figures of the Warring States period (c. 475 – 221 BCE). Alongside Confucianism, Mohism became the most prominent organized school of the Hundred Schools of Thought throughout the period. The Mozi is an anthology of writings traditionally attributed to Mozi and to his followers. Mohism is considered to be the oldest form of Monotheistic thought developed indigenously in Historical China.

Born in what is now Tengzhou, Shandong, Mozi and his followers argued strongly against both Confucianism and Taoism, with a philosophy emphasizing universal love, social order, the will of Heaven, sharing, and honoring the worthy. Mohism was actively developed and practiced across the Warring States–era in China. Mohism fell out of favor following the establishment of the Qin dynasty in 221 BCE.

While there is no reference to living Mohists from the Han dynasty (202 BCE – 220 CE), and tradition assumes the destruction of many Mohist texts in 213 BCE as part of Emperor Qin Shi Huang's burning of books and burying of scholars, traces of Mohism can still be seen late in the early Han (from 202 BCE) in syncretic texts like the Huainanzi of c. 139 BCE. As Confucianism became the dominant school of thought over the fading legalism system during the Han, Mohism disappeared almost entirely by the middle of the Western Han period of 202 BCE to 9 CE. Mozi is referenced in the 6th-century CE Thousand Character Classic, which records that he was saddened when he saw the dyeing of pure white silk, which to him embodied his conception of austerity as simplicity and chastity.

== Life ==
Mozi was born in Lu (seen toward the north, with a small coastline along the Yellow Sea) and spent some time as a government minister in Song (a landlocked state to the south of Lu).

Most historians believe that Mozi was a member of the lower artisan class who managed to climb his way to an official post. Mozi was a native of the state of Lu (modern Tengzhou, Shandong), although for a time he served as a minister in the state of Song. Similar to Confucius, Mozi was known to have maintained a school for those who desired to become officials serving in the different ruling courts of the Warring States.

Mozi was a carpenter and was extremely skilled in creating devices (see Lu Ban). Though he did not hold a high official position, Mozi was sought out by various rulers as an expert on fortification. He was schooled in Confucianism in his early years, although he viewed Confucianism as being too fatalistic, with an overemphasis on elaborate celebrations and funerals, which Mozi considered to be detrimental to the livelihood and productivity of the common people. Mozi managed to attract a large following during his lifetime, rivaling that of Confucius. His followers—mostly technicians and craftspeople—were organized in a disciplined order that studied both Mozi's philosophical and technical writings.

According to some accounts of the popular understanding of Mozi at the time, he had been hailed by many as the greatest hero to come from Henan. His passion was said to be for the good of the people, without concern for personal gain or even for his own life or death. His tireless contribution to society was praised by many, including Confucius's disciple Mencius. Mencius wrote in Jinxin (Chinese: 孟子盡心; pinyin: Mengzi jinxin) that Mozi believed in love for all mankind, noting that, as long as something benefitted mankind, Mozi would pursue it even if it meant "hurting his head or his feet". Zhang Tai Yan said that, in terms of moral virtue, even Confucius and Laozi could not compare to Mozi.

Mozi travelled from one crisis zone to another throughout the ravaged landscape of the Warring States, trying to dissuade rulers from their plans of conquest. According to the chapter "Gongshu" in the Mozi, he once walked for ten days to the state of Chu in order to forestall an attack on the State of Song. At the Chu court, Mozi engaged in nine simulated war games with Gongshu Ban, the chief military strategist of Chu, and overturned each one of his stratagems. When Gongshu Ban threatened him with death, Mozi informed the king that his disciples had already trained the soldiers of Song in his fortification methods, so it would be useless to kill him. The Chu king was forced to call off the war. On the way back, however, the soldiers of Song, not recognizing Mozi, would not allow him to enter their city, and he had to spend a night freezing in the rain. After this episode, he also prevented the state of Qi from attacking the State of Lu. He taught that the defense of a city did not depend only on fortification, weaponry, and food supply, but rather that it was also important to keep talented people close by and to put trust in them.

== Philosophy ==
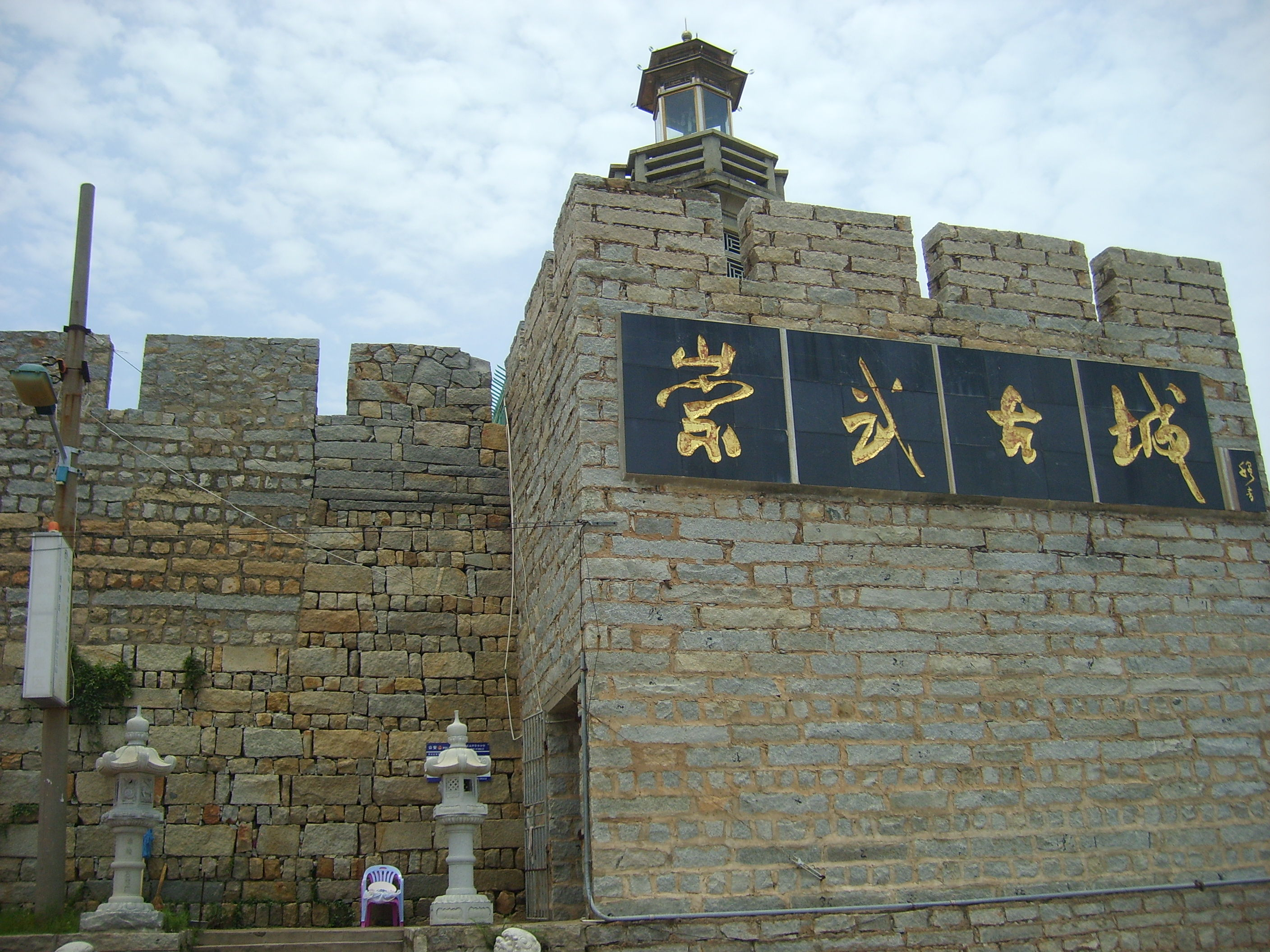
The Mohists were experts at building fortifications and siege defenses.

Mozi's moral teachings emphasized introspection, self-reflection, and authenticity, rather than obedience to rituals. He observed that people often learned about the world through adversity. By reflecting on one's own successes and failures, one attains true self-knowledge rather than mere conformity to ritual. Mozi exhorted people to lead a life of asceticism and self-restraint, renouncing both material and spiritual extravagance.

Like Confucius, Mozi idealized the Xia dynasty and the ancients of Chinese mythology, but he also criticized the Confucian belief that modern life should be patterned on the ways of the ancients. Mozi argued that what is thought of as "ancient" was actually innovative in its time, and thus should not be used to hinder present-day innovation. Though Mozi did not believe that history necessarily progresses, as did Han Fei Zi, he shared the latter's critique of fate (命, mìng). Mozi believed that people were capable of changing their circumstances and directing their own lives, which could be achieved by applying one's senses to observing the world, as well as judging objects and events by their causes, functions, and historical bases. This was the "three-prong method" Mozi recommended for testing the truth or falsehood of statements. His students later expanded upon this theory to form the School of Names.

Mozi tried to replace what he considered to be the long-entrenched Chinese ideal of strong attachments to family and clan structures with the concept of "impartial caring" or "universal love" (兼愛, jiān ài). He argued directly against Confucians, who had philosophized that it was natural and correct for people to care about different people in different degrees. Mozi, in contrast, argued that people in principle should care for all people equally, a notion that philosophers in other schools found absurd, as they interpreted this notion as implying no special amount of care or duty towards one's parents and family.

Overlooked by those critics, however, was a passage in the chapter on "Self-Cultivation" which stated, "When people near-by are not befriended, there is no use endeavoring to attract those at a distance." This point was also precisely articulated by a Mohist in a debate with Mencius (in the Mengzi), where the Mohist argued, in relation to carrying out universal love, that "we begin with what is near." Also, in the first chapter in the Mozi on the topic of universal love, Mozi argued that the best way of being filial to one's parents is to be filial to the parents of others. The foundational principle was therefore that benevolence, as well as malevolence, is requited, and that one would be treated by others as one treats others. Mozi quoted a popular passage from the Book of Odes to bring home this point: "When one throws to me a peach, I return to him a plum." One's parents will be treated by others as one treats the parents of others. Mozi also differentiated between "intention" and "actuality", thereby placing a central importance on the will to love, even though in practice it might very well be impossible to bring benefit to everyone.

In addition, Mozi argued that benevolence comes to human beings "as naturally as fire turns upward or water turns downward", provided that persons in positions of authority illustrate benevolence in their own lives. In differentiating between the ideas of "universal" (jian) and "differential" (bie), Mozi said that "universal" originated from righteousness while "differential" entailed human effort.

Mozi also held a belief in the power of ghosts and spirits, although he is often thought to have only worshipped them pragmatically, or in an Intercessory manner. In fact, in his discussion on ghosts and spirits, he remarked that, even if they did not exist, communal gatherings for the sake of making sacrificial offering would play a role in strengthening social bonds. Furthermore, for Mozi the will of Heaven (天, tiān) was that people should love one another, and that mutual love by all would bring benefit to all. Therefore, it was in everyone's interest that they would love others "as they love themselves". According to Mozi, Heaven should be respected because failing to do so would subject one to punishment. For Mozi, Heaven was not the "amoral", mystical nature of the Daoists; rather, it was a benevolent, moral force that rewarded good and punished evil. Similar in some ways to the beliefs systems found in the Abrahamic religions, Mozi believed that all living things lived in a realm ruled by Heaven, and Heaven possessed a will which was independent from, and higher than, the will of people. Thus Mozi wrote that "Universal love is the Way of Heaven", since "Heaven nourishes and sustains all life without regard to status." Mozi's ideal of government, which advocated a meritocracy based on talent rather than background, also followed his idea of Heaven.

Mozi opposed the Confucian idea of "Destiny", promoting instead an idea of "anti-fatalism" (非命). Where the Confucian philosophy held that a person's life, death, wealth, poverty, and social status were entirely dependent upon destiny and therefore could not be changed, Mozi argued that hard work and virtuous acts could change one's position in life.

=== Ethics ===
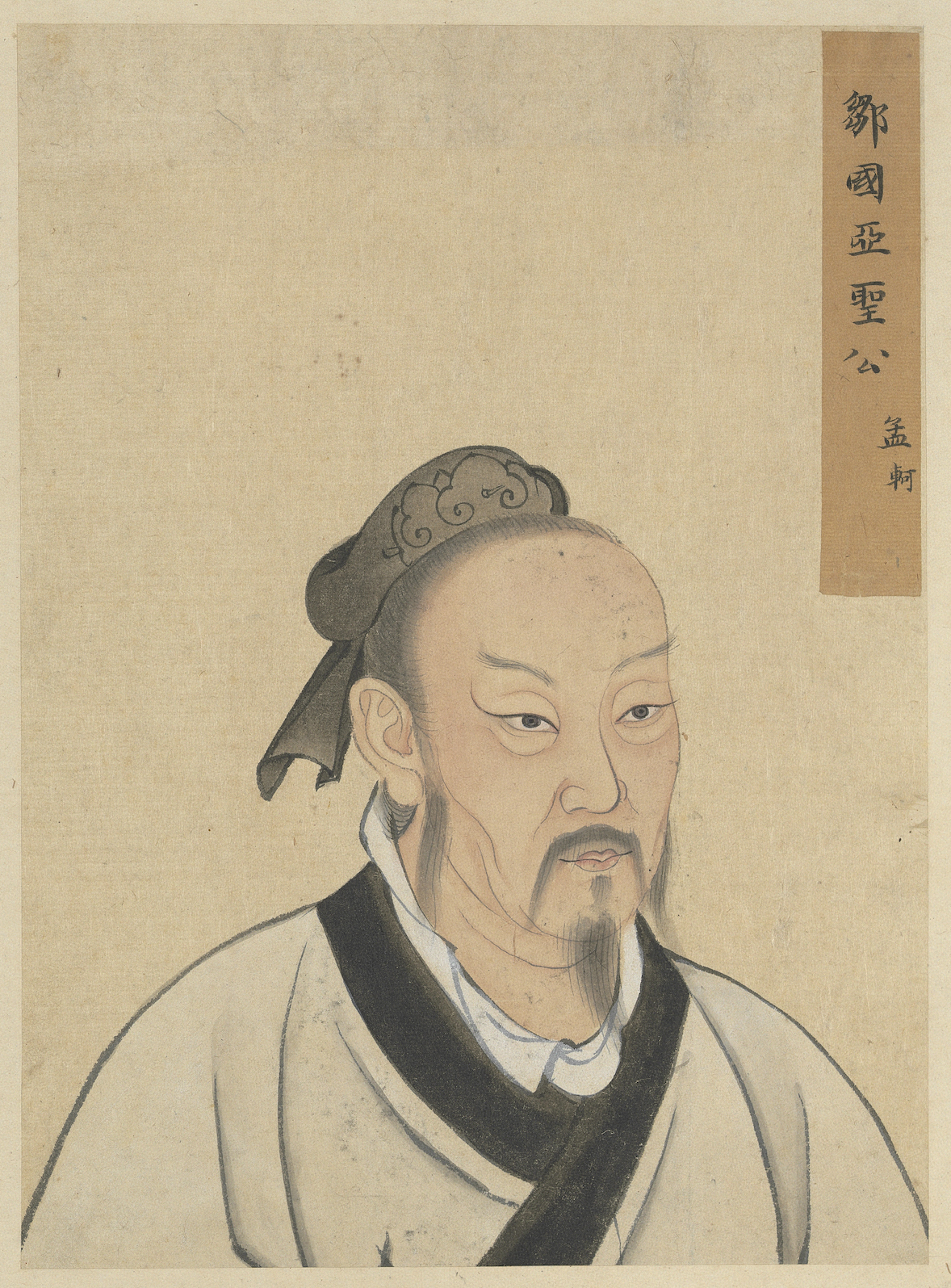
Confucian philosopher Mencius was one of several critics of Mozi, in part because Mozi's philosophy was believed to lack filial piety.

Mohist ethics is considered a form of consequentialism, according to which the morality of an action, statement, teaching, policy, judgment, and so on, is determined by the consequences that it brings about. In particular, Mozi thought that actions should be measured by the way they contribute to the benefit of all members of society. With this criterion, Mozi denounced things as diverse as offensive warfare, expensive funerals, and even music and dance, which he saw as serving no useful purpose. According to the Stanford Encyclopedia of Philosophy, Mohist consequentialism, dating back to the 5th century BCE, is the "world's earliest form of consequentialism, a remarkably sophisticated version based on a plurality of intrinsic goods taken as constitutive of human welfare". Consequentialist theories vary over exactly which consequences are relevant, though they all share the same basic outcome-based structure. With Mozi's overwhelming focus on "benefit" (利, li) among other ends, and his explicit focus on making moral evaluations in light of them, Mozi's ethics indeed shares this consequentalist structure. For interpreting Mozi, however, there is some debate over how to understand the consequences Mozi seems most concerned with, and therefore over which kind of consequentialism to ascribe to him.

Some believe the best descriptor to be state consequentialism. According to this reading, Mohist ethics makes moral evaluations based on how well the action, statement, etc., in question contributes to the stability of a state. Such state-related goods include social order, material wealth, and population growth. By centering his ethical theory around the promotion of such state-related ends, Mozi shows himself to be a state consequentialist. Unlike hedonistic utilitarianism, which views pleasure as a moral good, "the basic goods in Mohist consequentialist thinking are ... order, material wealth, and increase in population". During Mozi's era, war and famines were common, and population growth was seen as a moral necessity for a harmonious society. Mozi opposed wars because they wasted life and resources while interfering with the fair distribution of wealth, yet he recognized the need for strong urban defenses so he could maintain the harmonious society he desired. The "material wealth" of Mohist consequentialism refers to basic needs like shelter and clothing, and the "order" of Mohist consequentialism refers to Mozi's stance against warfare and violence, which he viewed as pointless and a threat to social stability. Stanford sinologist David Shepherd Nivison, in The Cambridge History of Ancient China, writes that the moral goods of Mohism "are interrelated: more basic wealth, then more reproduction; more people, then more production and wealth ... if people have plenty, they would be good, filial, kind, and so on unproblematically". In contrast to Jeremy Bentham, Mozi did not believe that individual happiness was important; the consequences of the state outweigh the consequences of individual actions.

Alternative readings locate the main focus of Mozi's consequentialism in the welfare of the people themselves rather than that of the state as a whole. Such interpretations as Chris Fraser's argue that it is a mistake to view Mozi's focus on the collective well-being of a population as a focus on the well-being of the state itself rather than its constituents. In this way, Mozi tended to evaluate actions based on whether they provide benefit to the people, which he measured in terms of an enlarged population (states were sparsely populated in his day), a prosperous economy, and social order. Indeed these are collective goods rather than individual ones, which is a major difference between Mohist consequentialism and modern, Western versions. However, this reading emphasizes that collective goods are better considered as aggregated individual goods rather than as state goods.

This consequentialist structure supports Mohist ethics and politics, which survives in the form of 10 core doctrines:

1. Promoting the Worthy
2. Identifying Upward
3. Universal Love (sometimes called "Inclusive Care")
4. Condemning Aggression
5. Moderation in Use
6. Moderation in Burials
7. Heaven's Intent
8. Understanding Ghosts
9. Condemning Music
10. Condemning Fatalism

Each of these doctrines is justified on the grounds that it produces the best consequences for society, and that all people stand to benefit from adopting them. Promoting the worthy, for example, encourages people in positions of power to hire competent and worthy subordinates to fill posts, rather than hire friends and relatives instead. The reasoning here is that someone better qualified for the job will perform better and enable society as a whole to benefit. Identifying upward refers to the idea that people in subordinate positions in society must look to their superiors as models for their own conduct. Provided that the superiors are indeed morally competent and worthy of emulation, the rest of society will always have a reliable guide for their own actions, thereby giving rise to social benefits.

Universal love refers to the basic normative attitude the Mohists encourage people to adopt towards others. The idea is that people ought to consider all others as being part of their scope of moral concern. Indeed this is perhaps the most infamous of Mohist doctrines, and was criticized early on by philosophers such as Mengzi, who held that the doctrine was akin to renouncing one's family. However, close readings of the texts by modern scholars have shown the demands of Mohist universal love to be much more mild and reasonable. Additionally, given the accretional nature of the texts, the audience of such texts may have changed depending upon the Mohists' social influence, and so the demands for universal love made on rulers, for example, is considerably higher than that made on the masses. At its most basic, however, the doctrine merely encourages a general attitude of care towards others. However, this does not require that they renounce all forms of special relationships they have with our families and friends. In fact, the Mohists introduce the problem that universal love is meant to solve by lamenting the fact that fathers and sons don't care for each other, and so must instead adopt an attitude of universal love. Conversely, the Mohists hope, when people adopt an attitude of universal love, society as a whole will benefit.

Dovetailing with this idea is that of condemning aggression. The main targets of this doctrine are undoubtedly the rulers of the various warring states in China, who regularly embarked on expansionist military campaigns in order to increase their territory, power, and influence. However, such campaigns were enormously taxing on the population, disrupting regular farming cycles by conscripting able-bodied people for these military ends. Additionally, the practices is ethically wrong for the same reason that robbery and murder are wrong. In fact, according to Mozi, the two are actually one and the same; for what is an expansionist war of aggression other than robbery and murder on a grand scale? And yet, Mozi laments, those rulers who execute robbers and murderers engage in the very same practices. With respect to universal love, indeed part of the reason why rulers believe it is acceptable to invade and conquer other states while it is not acceptable for their own subjects to rob and steal from one another is that the people in neighboring states are not part of the rulers' scope of moral concern. If rulers were to instead include these people and refrain from wars of aggression, all states, those attacking and those defending, will benefit.

Moderation in use and moderation in burials are the main Mohist ideas about frugality. In one's own projects, utility ought to be the only consideration.

What is the purpose of houses? It is to protect us from the wind and cold of winter, the heat and rain of summer, and to keep out robbers and thieves. Once these ends have been secured, that is all. Whatever does not contribute to these ends should be eliminated.

— Mozi, Mozi (5th century BC) Ch 20

The Mohists took particular offense to the practice of extremely lavished funerals and demanding mourning rituals. Such funerals and rituals would potentially bankrupt an entire clan, at least temporarily, and disrupt its farming practices. For the dead in higher positions of authority, this disruption would affect an even greater number of people. Again, the point here is to promote benefit across society, and the Mohists believe that adopting frugal practices will do so.

Mozi's ideas about ghosts and spirits follow from their religious beliefs in a morally consistent universe. Heaven, it is argued, is the ultimate moral standard, while ghosts and spirits serve as Heaven's enforcers. Both doctrines, when adopted, promote societal benefit both by enabling people to rely upon an objective standard to guide their actions (namely, Heaven), and by acting as a sort of cosmic authority capable of enacting rewards and punishments.

Mozi's condemnation of music rests on the same economic considerations as their general ideas of frugality. In ancient China, grand musical ceremonies established by rulers would place enormous financial and human strains on populations, and so Mozi condemned such ceremonies for this reason. Mozi did not object to music in principle—"It's not that I don't like the sound of the drum" ("Against Music")—but only because of the heavy tax burden such activities placed on commoners and also due to the fact that officials tended to indulge in them at the expense of their duties.

Finally, the Mohists rejected the idea of fatalism, or the idea that there is fate. The Mohists reject this idea on the grounds that it encourages lazy and irresponsible behavior. When people believe that there is fate, and that the consequences of their actions lie beyond their control, people will not be encouraged to improve themselves, nor will they be willing to take responsibility for disasters. As a result, society will suffer, and so the doctrine that there is fate ought to be rejected.

== Works and influence ==
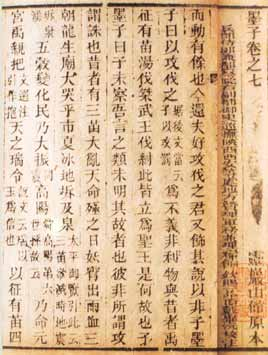
A page from the Mozi

"Mozi" is also the name of the philosophical anthology written and compiled by followers of Mozi. The text was formed by an accretional process that took place over a period of hundreds of years, beginning perhaps during or shortly after Mozi's lifetime, and lasting until perhaps the early Han dynasty. During the Han dynasty, as Confucianism came to be the official school of political thought, Mohism gradually lost both its adherents and influence while simultaneously being partly incorporated into more mainstream political thought. The text was eventually neglected, and only 58 of the text's original 71 books (pian) survive, some of which, notably the later Mohist Canons, contain significant textual corruptions and are fragmentary in nature. The anthology can be divided into 5 main groups, which are determined on the basis of both chronological and thematic features:

- Books 1-7 consist of short, miscellaneous essays containing summaries of Mohist doctrines, anecdotes about Mozi, and ideals about meritocratic government. Some appear to be relatively late texts, expressing mature Mohist political and ethical thought on some topics.
- Books 8-37 contain the Mohists' key essays on the ten "core" Mohist doctrines. Though they exhibit explicit thematic unity, textual evidence suggests that the Mohists revisited their core doctrines throughout their activity, responding to objections and addressing issues unresolved in earlier, often shorter and simpler expositions.
- Books 38-39 are a series of polemics against the Ru (Confucians). They are often grouped with books 8-37, though they do not expound a positive doctrine, and their purpose is entirely critical.
- Books 40-45 are often referred to as the "dialectical books." These are often considered "later Mohist" writings, though actual chronological details about them are difficult to glean. They are written in an idiosyncratic style, and focus on a broad range of issues that go well beyond those of the Mohist core doctrines, including logic, epistemology, optics, geometry, and ethics.
- Books 46-51 are dialogues. They are probably later, and likely fictional, exhibiting Mozi in conversation with various interlocutors.
- Books 52-71 are chapters on military affairs, specifically focusing on preparing for defensive warfare.

The Mozi is a rich source of insight into early Chinese dynastic history, culture, and philosophy. The text frequently cites ancient classics, such as the Shang Shu, and at times departs from the received version, giving scholars insight into the textual development of such classics as well.

The texts portray Mozi as a mouthpiece for Mohist philosophy and not much else. This picture contrasts that of Confucius and Mencius found in the Lunyu (Analects) and Mengzi respectively, wherein the thinkers in question are portrayed as expressing emotions, chiding students, and even making mistakes. (Consider Mengzi's disastrous advice to the King of Qi to invade the state of Yan.) To contrast, Mozi has little if any personality in the text, instead serving only as a mouthpiece for Mohist philosophy.

Mohism, like other schools of thought at the time, was suppressed under the Qin and died out completely under the Han, as its more radical adherents gradually dissolved and its most compelling ideas became absorbed by mainstream political thought. The influence of Mozi is still visible in many Han dynasty works written hundreds of years later. For example, the Confucian scholar Gongsun Hong describes the Confucian virtue of ren ("benevolence") in Mohist terms. Additionally, Mohist epistemology and philosophy of language had a profound influence on the development of classical Chinese philosophy in general. In fact, Mohism was so prominent during the Warring States period that philosophical opponents, including Mencius and some authors of the Daoist anthology, the Zhuangzi, lament the very prevalence and widespread influence of their ideas.

In modern times, Mohism has been given a fresh analysis. Sun Yat-Sen used "universal love" as one of the foundations for his idea of Chinese democracy. More recently, Chinese scholars under Communism have tried to rehabilitate Mozi as a "philosopher of the people", highlighting his rational-empirical approach to the world as well as his "proletarian" background. The body in the Mozi is constructed by xing (形, 'body'), xin (心, 'heart'), qi (氣, 'energy') 'which is in accord with the Pre-Qin thinkers' understanding to the body. While xing refers to the flesh-bloody part of human being, the concept of xin focuses on the aspect of cognition and is closely related to the concept of shan (善, 'goodness'), ai (愛, 'love'), zhi (志, 'will') and xing.

Some views claim that Mozi's philosophy was at once more advanced and less so than that of Confucius. Indeed the Mohists were radical political reformers who sought primarily to benefit the masses and challenge the practices of the ruling orthodoxy, often targeting a perceived wasteful aristocracy whom they referred to as "the gentlemen of the world." The Mohist idea of "universal love" embraced a broader idea of human community than that of the Confucians, arguing that the scope of individuals' moral concern should include all people. Opponents of this idea often claimed that "universal love" was akin to renouncing one's family, and indeed more strict Mohists living in Mohist communities as the school flourished may have exhibited such behavior. However, there is some scholarly debate over just how radical the provisions of universal love actually are, and, as can be seen from the example of Gongsun Hong above, the less radical components of the doctrine were eventually absorbed by mainstream thought.

Mozi is also famous for his ideas about frugality, such as those concerning moderating expenses and eliminating wasteful ceremonies including music and funerals. A common misconception is that the Mohists eschewed all forms of art, but of course the Mohists' targets are more specifically elaborate, state-sponsored rituals that would place incredible financial burdens upon a mostly peasant population. This can be seen from Xunzi's own arguments against Mozi in book 10 of the Xunzi "Enriching the State," where Xunzi argues against Mozi that prominent displays of wealth on the part of the state is necessary to maintaining social order.

Some modern-day supporters for Mozi (as well as Communism) make the claim that Mohism and modern Communism share a lot in terms of ideals for community life. Others would claim that Mohism shares more with the central ideas of Christianity, especially in terms of the idea of "universal love" (in Greek, "agape"), the "Golden Rule", and the relation of humanity to the supernatural realm. However, Mohism is undoubtedly a product of Warring States China, a period of tremendous political violence and turmoil. The Mohists were political reformers, but they did not seek to challenge the monarchical model of government that prevailed during that time, and sought instead to reform from within by encouraging governments to hire competent people to carry out political tasks, care for their people inclusively, eliminate frivolous government spending, and halt all wars of aggression.

In many ways the influence of Mohism was a victim of its own successes, and it is fairly easy to understand its decline. The Mohists' ideas about the importance of meritocracy and universal love were gradually absorbed by mainstream Confucian thinking. Their opposition to offensive warfare became irrelevant once the various Warring States were unified under the Qin and later Han dynasty, and their religious superstitions were eventually replaced with less supernatural accounts. So their most promising ideas were metabolized by the tradition, while their more radical and anachronistic ones were gradually discarded, leading to their demise during the Han dynasty.

== Mohism and science ==
He is believed by Joseph Needham to have described the physical phenomenon camera obscura. (Note: In the Mozi passage, a camera obscura is described as a "collecting-point" or "treasure house" (庫); the 18th-century scholar Bi Yuan (畢沅) suggested this was a misprint for "screen" (㢓).)

== See also ==
- A Battle of Wits – a historical film based around Mohism
- History of geometry
- List of people on stamps of the People's Republic of China
- Fa, an influential concept elaborated by Mozi
