= Mozi (book) =

Ancient Chinese text expounding Mohism

- First page from a Ming dynasty printed edition
- Author: (trad.) Mo Di
- Original title: 墨子
- Language: Classical Chinese
- Genre: Philosophy
- Publication date: 5th–3rd centuries BC
- Publication place: China
- English publication date: 1929
- Media type: manuscript
- Dewey Decimal: 181.115
- LC Class: B128 .M6
- Translation: Mozi at Wikisource

Mozi
- "Mozi" in seal script (top) and regular (bottom) Chinese characters
- Chinese: 墨子
- Literal meaning: "[The Writings of] Master Mo"
Transcriptions
Standard Mandarin
- Hanyu Pinyin: Mòzǐ
- Gwoyeu Romatzyh: Mohtzy
- Wade–Giles: Mo^{4}-tzŭ^{3}
- IPA: [mwô.tsɨ̀]
Wu
- Romanization: Meʔ tzy
Yue: Cantonese
- Yale Romanization: Mahk-jí
- Jyutping: Mak^{6}-zi^{2}
- IPA: [mɐk̚˨.tsi˧˥]
Southern Min
- Tâi-lô: Ba̍k-tzú
Middle Chinese
- Middle Chinese: Mok-tsí
Old Chinese
- Baxter–Sagart (2014): *C.mˤək tsəʔ

The Mozi (Chinese: 墨子), also called the Mojing (Chinese: 墨經) or the Mohist canon, is an ancient Chinese text from the Warring States period (476–221 BC) that expounds the philosophy of Mohism. It propounds such Mohist ideals as impartiality, meritocratic governance, economic growth and aversion to ostentation, and is known for its plain and simple language.

The book's chapters can be divided into several categories: a core of 31 chapters, containing the basics of Mohist philosophy; several traditionally known as the "Dialectical Chapters", among the most important in early Chinese texts on logic; five sections containing stories and information about Mozi, his disciples, and his followers; and eleven chapters on technology and defensive warfare, on which the Mohists were expert and which are valuable sources of information on ancient Chinese military technology. There two other minor sections: an initial group of seven chapters that are clearly of a much later date, and two anti-Confucian chapters, of which one has survived.

The Mohist philosophical school went into decline in the 3rd century BC, and copies of the Mozi were not well-preserved. The modern text has been described as "notoriously corrupt". Of the Mozi's 71 original chapters, 18 have been lost, and several others are badly fragmented.

== Authorship ==
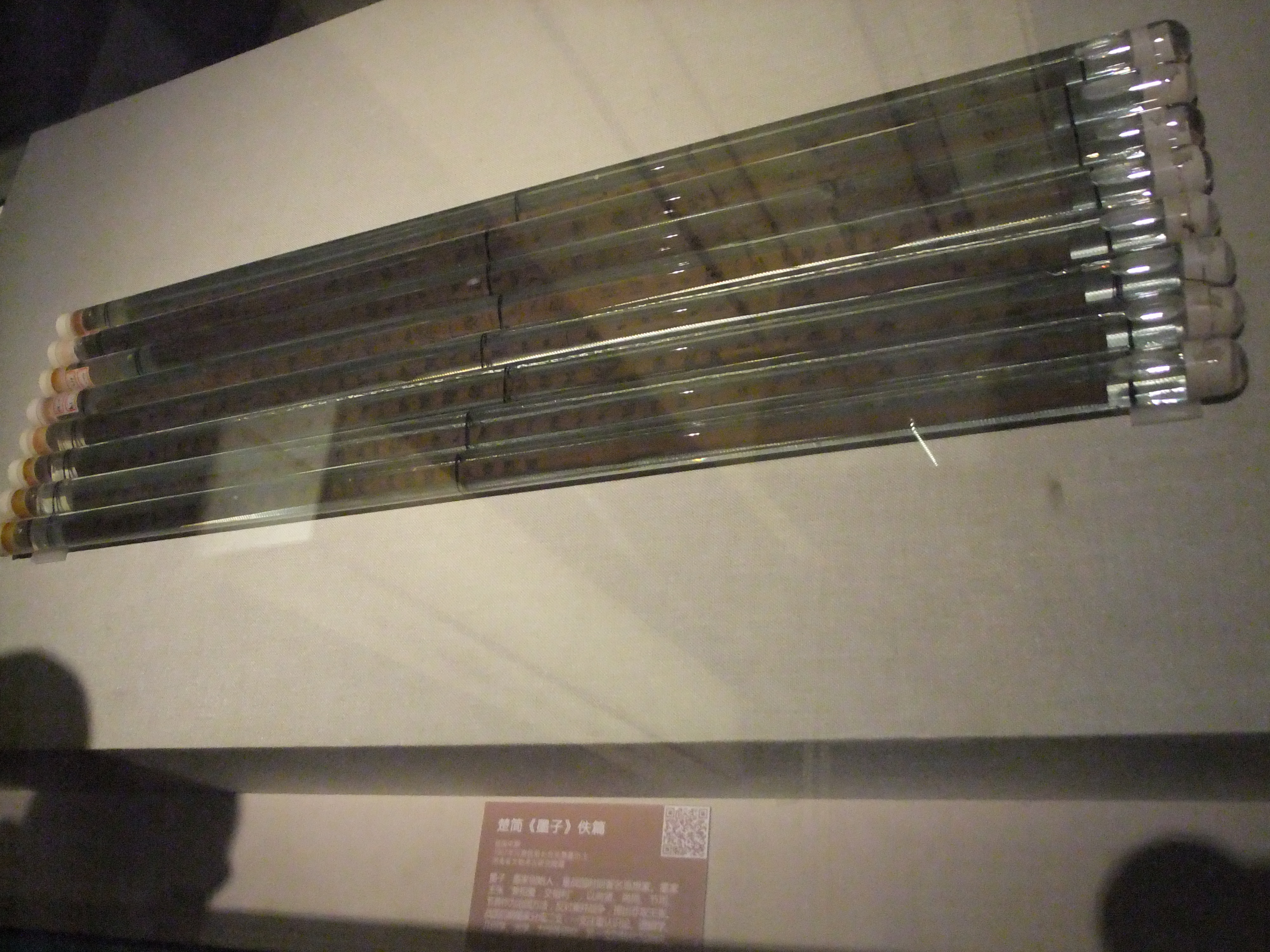
Exhibition of discovered bamboo slips of the text Mozi excavated from 2nd century BC tombs

Pages from a printed edition of Mozi from the Qianlong period of the Qing dynasty

The Mozi, as well as the entire philosophical school of Mohism, is named for and traditionally ascribed to Mo Di, usually known as "Mozi" (Mandarin Chinese: Mòzǐ 墨子), meaning "Master Mo". Mozi is a figure from the 5th century BC about whom nothing is reliably known. Most sources describe him as being from the State of Lu—though one says he was from the State of Song—and say that he traveled around the various Warring States trying to persuade their rulers to stop attacking each other.

Mozi seems to have come from a humble family, and some elements of the book suggest that he may have been an artisan or craftsman, such as a carpenter. Some scholars have theorized that the name Mo (墨), which means "ink", may not be a surname, but may instead indicate that Mozi underwent the branding or tattooing that was used in ancient China as a form of criminal punishment.

Benjamin I. Schwartz took the Mozi's early chapters, deriving more directly from Mozi, as including concepts like "Rejecting Fatalism", "Heaven's Will", and "Universal Love". Its works on logic are "patently" a later development of the third century BC, though Mozi clearly values the mind and "illuminate" its original doctrine.

== Content ==
A page from a 1552 Ming dynasty printed edition of Mozi

The Mozi originally comprised 71 chapters. Of these, 18 have been lost and several others are damaged and fragmentary. The text of the book can be divided into six sections:

- Chapters 1–7: a group of miscellaneous essays and dialogues that were clearly added at a later date and are somewhat incongruous with the rest of the book.
- Chapters 8–37: a large group of chapters—of which seven are missing and three are fragmentary—that form the core Mozi chapters and elucidate the ten main philosophical doctrines of the Mohist school of thought. Mozi is frequently referenced and cited in these chapters.
- Chapters 38–39: two chapters—of which only chapter 39 survives—entitled "Against Confucianism" (非儒; Fēi Rú), containing polemical arguments against the ideals of Confucianism. These chapters are sometimes grouped with chapters 8–37.
- Chapters 40–45: a group of six chapters, often called the "Dialectical Chapters", which are some of the most unique writings of ancient China. They cover topics in logic, epistemology, ethics, geometry, optics, and mechanics. The "Dialectical Chapters" are dense and difficult, largely because the text is badly garbled and corrupted.
- Chapters 46–51: six chapters—of which chapter 51, including even its title, has been lost—that contain stories and dialogues about Mozi and his followers. These chapters are probably of later date and are probably partly fictional.
- Chapters 52–71: a group of chapters—nine of which have been lost—known as the "Military Chapters", containing instructions on defensive warfare, supposedly from Mozi to his chief disciple Qin Guli (禽滑厘). These chapters are badly damaged and corrupted.

== Selected translations ==
The damaged nature of the later chapters of the Mozi have made translating it difficult, and translators have had to try to analyze and repair the text before translating it. The first Mozi translation in a Western language—the 1922 German translation of Alfred Forke—was done before these problems were well understood, and thus contains many errors in the "Dialectical" and "Military" chapters. Only in the late 20th century did accurate translations of the later Mozi chapters appear:

- (in German) Alfred Forke (1922), Mê Ti: Des Socialethikers und seiner Schüler philosophische Werke, Berlin: Kommissionsverlag der Vereinigung wissenschaftlicher Verleger.
- Mei Yi-pao (1929), The Ethical and Political Works of Motse, London: Probsthain. Reprinted (1974), Taipei: Ch'eng-wen.
- Burton Watson (1963), Mo Tzu: Basic Writings, New York: Columbia University Press.
- A. C. Graham (1978), Later Mohist Logic, Ethics, and Science, Hong Kong: Chinese University Press.
- Ian Johnston (2010), The Mozi: A Complete Translation, Hong Kong: Chinese University Press.
- Chris Fraser (2020), The Essential Mòzǐ: Ethical, Political, and Dialectical Writings, New York: Oxford University Press.

Many Mozi translations in modern Chinese and Japanese exist.
