= Battle of Julu =

207 BCE battle between Qin and Chu, battle

Coordinates: 37.0667°N 114.4833°E

- Part of the Late Qin peasant rebellions
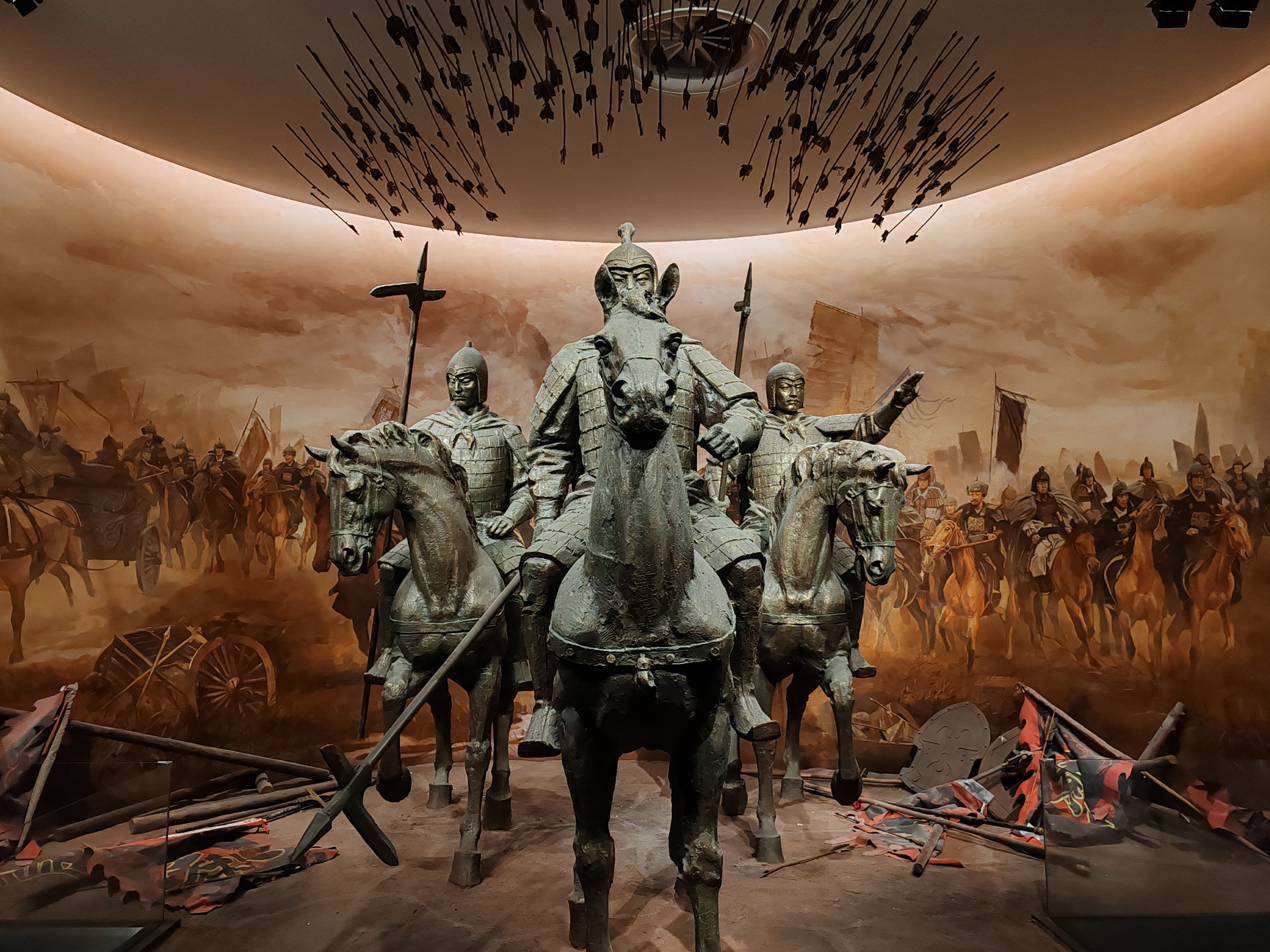
- Statue of Battle of Julu in Xingtai Museum
Date	207 BC
Location	Pingxiang County, Xingtai, Hebei, China
Result	Chu victory: Qin military power severely diminished

Belligerents
Chu state	Qin dynasty

Commanders and leaders
Xiang Yu; Ying Bu; Zhongli Mo	Zhang Han (surrendered); Sima Xin (surrendered); Dong Yi (surrendered); Wang Li (POW); She Jian †; Su Jiao †

Strength
70,000 Chu troops, 80,000+ troops from other insurgent states (Did not participate in the fighting)	200,000 in Wang Li's army, 200,000 in Zhang Han's army (Did not participate in the fighting)

Casualties and losses
Unknown, but relatively less	200,000 killed in battle. Five months after the battle, another 200,000+ troops from Zhang Han's army surrendered and were buried alive

Battle of Julu
- Traditional Chinese: 鉅鹿之戰
- Simplified Chinese: 钜鹿之战or巨鹿之战
Transcriptions
Standard Mandarin
- Hanyu Pinyin: Jùlù Zhī Zhàn

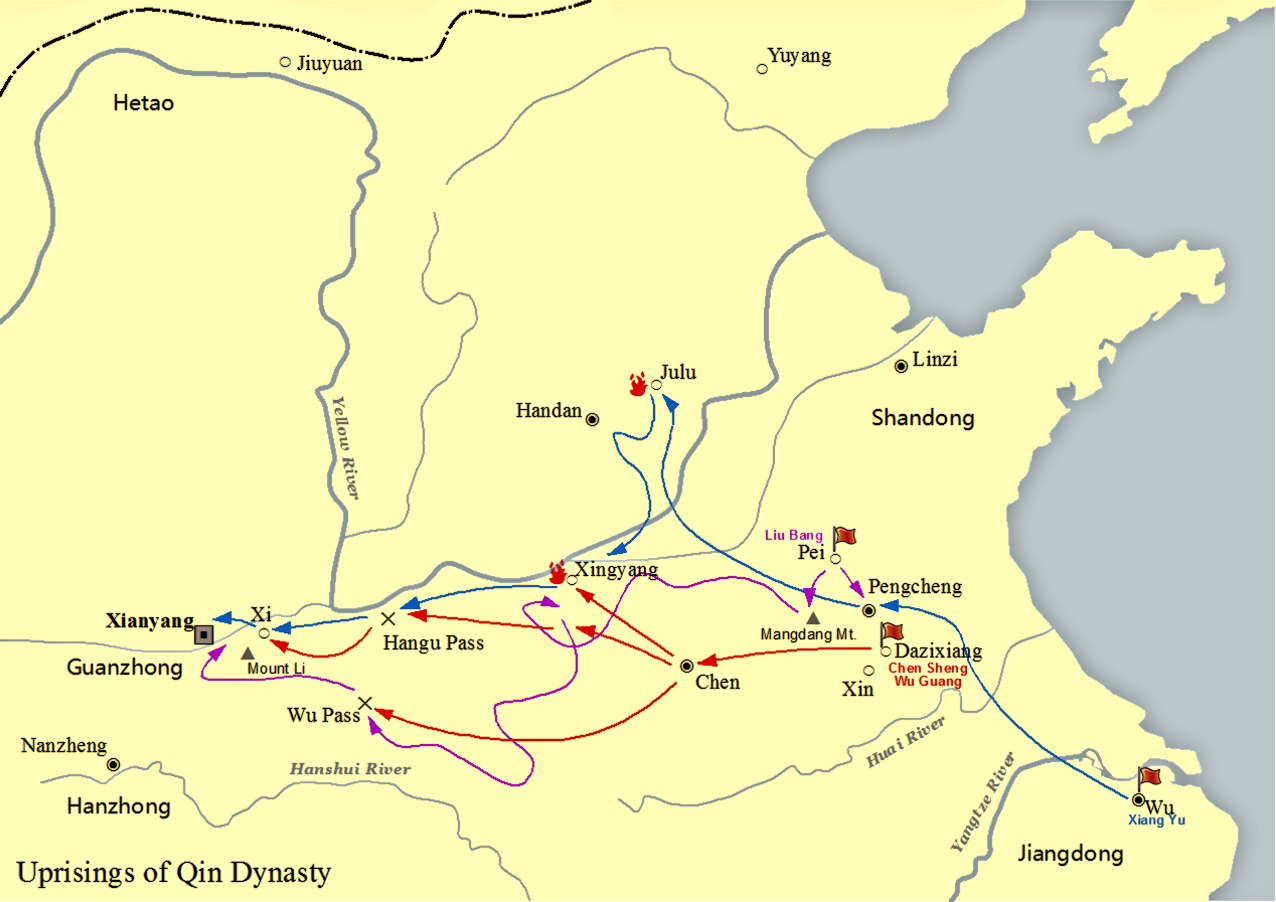
Uprisings of Qin Dynasty, including the location of Julu.

The Battle of Julu (Chinese: 鉅鹿之戰) was fought in Julu (in present-day Pingxiang County, Xingtai, Hebei, China) in 207 BC primarily between forces of the Qin dynasty and the insurgent state of Chu. The Qin commander was Zhang Han, while the Chu leader was Xiang Yu. The battle concluded with a decisive victory for the rebels over the larger Qin army. The battle marked the decline of Qin military power as the bulk of the Qin armies were destroyed in this battle.

== Background ==
In the ninth lunar month of 208 BC, at the Battle of Dingtao, the Qin general Zhang Han defeated a force from the insurgent Chu state led by Xiang Liang. Zhang Han then led the Qin army north across the Yellow River to attack another rebel state, Zhao, defeating the Zhao army and capturing Handan, the Zhao capital. He then ordered his deputies Wang Li (王離) and She Jian (涉間) to besiege Julu (in present-day Pingxiang County, Xingtai, Hebei), where Zhao Xie and his forces had retreated to, while he garrisoned his army at the south to maintain a route for supplying the troops attacking Julu.

Zhao's ruler Zhao Xie (趙歇) sent a messenger to request aid from King Huai II of Chu. King Huai II dispatched two armies. The first, commanded by Song Yi, with Xiang Yu (Xiang Liang's nephew) as his deputy, was to relieve the siege on Julu; the second, led by Liu Bang, would proceed to attack the Qin heartland of Guanzhong. The king promised that he would grant whoever conquered Guanzhong first the title of "King of Guanzhong".

Song Yi's army reached Anyang, some distance away from Julu. Song Yi ordered his troops to lay camp there for 46 days. Xiang Yu was eager to engage Zhang Han and avenge his uncle Xiang Liang, so he urged Song Yi to issue an attack order. Song Yi declined Xiang Yu's suggestion and remarked that Xiang was a foolhardy man, and gave instructions that "anyone with barbaric, defiant, fame-seeking behaviour that leads to a violation of orders will be executed".

Song Yi later sent his son Song Xiang (宋襄) to the Qi state and threw a lavish banquet at Wujian (無鹽; east of present-day Dongping County, Shandong) to see his son off. At the time, there were heavy rains and Song Yi's soldiers suffered from cold and hunger. Xiang Yu made use of the situation to incite the men's anger towards Song Yi. On the morning of the 47th day, Xiang Yu burst into Song Yi's tent, took the latter by surprise and killed him. Xiang Yu then announced to the army that Song Yi was plotting with the Qi state against Chu, and that he had received a secret order from King Huai II to execute the traitor Song Yi. The other subordinate generals feared Xiang Yu and allowed him to be the acting commander. Xiang Yu sent a messenger to inform King Huai II and the king was forced to retroactively approve his command.

== Battle ==
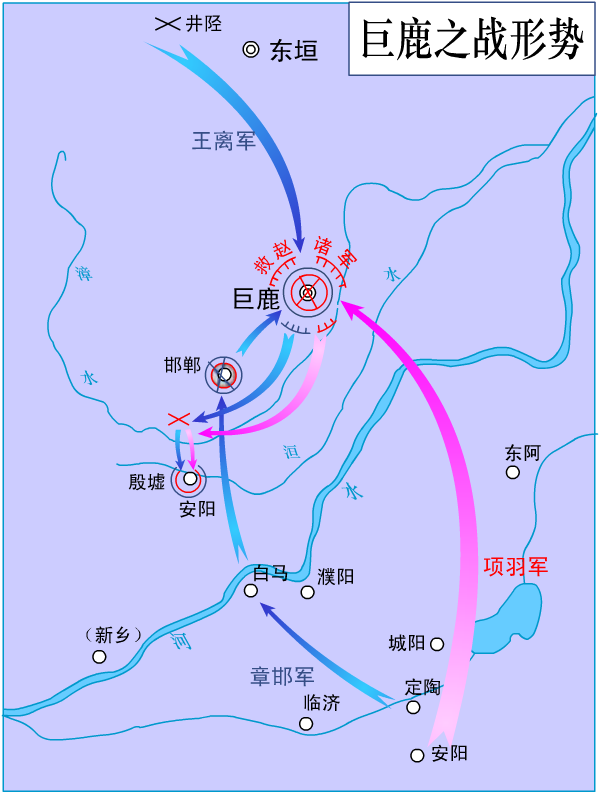
Map of Battle of Julu

Xiang Yu sent Ying Bu and Zhongli Mo to lead 20,000 men to cross the Yellow River and relieve Julu, and they won a few skirmishes. In the twelfth month of 208 BC, Xiang Yu personally led an army across the river to meet up with Ying Bu and Zhongli Mo. By the time he arrived on the battlefield, Zhao forces in Julu had been nearly starved under a prolonged siege by Zhang Han's deputy Wang Li. Xiang Yu ordered his men to carry only three days worth of supplies and destroy the rest, along with their cauldrons and cooking utensils, and sink the boats they used to cross the river. In doing so, Xiang Yu was sending a clear signal to his troops that they had no chance of survival unless they defeated the enemy and seized their supplies.

Xiang Yu's troops fought very fiercely, to the extent of "every Chu soldier taking on ten foes", and eventually defeated Qin forces in nine consecutive engagements. Wang Li's supply lines were disrupted and the Qin army suffered a crushing defeat. With casualties mounting to over 100,000, Zhang Han was forced to retreat from Julu to Jiyuan, and he planned to defend Jiyuan until reinforcements arrived from Xianyang (the Qin capital). The Qin general Su Jiao (蘇角) was killed in action. Meanwhile, Wang Li was captured. She Jian (涉間) refused to surrender and committed suicide by throwing himself into a fire.

Before Xiang Yu launched the assault, forces from other insurgent principalities had arrived at Julu to reinforce the Zhao state, but they did not dare to advance for fear of the large Qin army and only garrisoned outside of the battle area. When Xiang Yu attacked the Qin forces, the other rebel armies did not participate in the fighting and they watched the battle from their camps. After seeing Xiang Yu defeat the 400,000-strong Qin army, the other insurgent forces came to join him out of admiration for his martial valour, thus increasing the size of his army to 400,000. When Xiang Yu received them at the gate of his camp, the rebel commanders were so afraid of him that they sank to their knees and did not dare to look up at him.

== Qin surrender ==
After his defeat, Zhang Han sent his deputy Sima Xin to Xianyang to ask for reinforcements and supplies. The eunuch Zhao Gao deceived the Qin emperor Qin Er Shi and falsely accused Zhang Han of military failure and conspiring with the rebels. The emperor dismissed Zhang's request. Zhao Gao even sent assassins to kill Sima Xin on his return journey, but Sima survived and escaped back to report to Zhang Han. Just as Zhang Han was in a dilemma whether to retreat or surrender, Xiang Yu's forces completely surrounded Zhang Han and prevented the Qin army from withdrawing. In dire straits, Zhang Han, along with his deputies Sima Xin and Dong Yi and his 200,000 men, eventually surrendered to Xiang Yu in the summer of 207 BC.

== Live burial of Qin soldiers ==
In the 11th month of 207 BC, Xiang Yu led his army to the city of Xin'an (新安; in present-day Yima, Henan) and made camp. He perceived the 200,000 surrendered Qin soldiers as disloyal and suspected that they might start a mutiny, so he had them all buried alive at the south of outside Xin'an. Another reason for the massacre was that Xiang Yu saw the Qin soldiers as a liability because they would put a strain on his army's food supplies.

== Aftermath ==
Although Xiang Yu had the 200,000 surrendered Qin soldiers buried alive, he spared the three generals Zhang Han, Sima Xin and Dong Yi. The three were later respectively appointed as "King of Yong", "King of Sai" and "King of Dai" when Xiang Yu divided the fallen Qin Empire into the Eighteen Kingdoms. The three were collectively known as the Three Qins and their domains were located in the former Qin heartland of Guanzhong.

After his victory at Julu, Xiang Yu led his forces towards Guanzhong and prepared for an invasion of the Qin heartland. In the winter of 207 BC, the last Qin emperor Ziying surrendered to Liu Bang in Xianyang, bringing an end to the Qin dynasty. When Xiang Yu reached Hangu Pass, the eastern gateway to Guanzhong, he saw that Liu Bang had already occupied Guanzhong. Xiang Yu was displeased as he heard that Liu Bang would become "King of Guanzhong" in accordance with King Huai II's earlier promise. After the Feast at Hong Gate, Xiang Yu occupied Xianyang in early 206 BC after Liu Bang evacuated his forces from the city. Xiang Yu ordered the execution of Ziying and his family, as well as the destruction of the Epang Palace by fire.

== Legacy ==
Some chengyu (Chinese idioms) and proverbs originated from the events in the Battle of Julu, including:

- "Breaking cauldrons and sinking boats" (破釜沉舟); in modern usage, used similarly to the English "crossing the Rubicon" or "to reach the point of no return"
- "Pitting the strength of one against ten" (以一當十)
- "Sitting on the wall and watching" (坐壁上觀)

The Ming dynasty politician and scholar Mao Kun described the Battle of Julu as:

"Xiang Yu's proudest moment in battle, and Taishigong (Sima Qian)'s most gratifying document."

The Qing dynasty artist Zheng Banqiao wrote a poem titled Battle of Julu:

Cruelty and barbarism masked by deception and cunning, Cao Cao and Zhu Wen both claimed the throne. This is nothing like a hero riding on a fine horse with a beautiful maiden, people who cross the Wu River shed tears.

In 1912, workers constructing the Longhai Railway unearthed large amounts of human remains at Yima, Henan, the site where Xiang Yu had the 200,000 surrendered Qin soldiers buried alive. The place has since been referred to as the "Chu pits" (楚坑).

== See also ==
- Timeline of the Chu–Han Contention
