= Dong Yi =

Dong Yi may refer to:

- Dong Yi (TV series), a Korean drama
- Dong Yi (Qin Dynasty), a Qin Dynasty general
- Consort Suk of the Choe clan, King Sukjong's concubine
- Dongyi may refer to an ethnic group known from Chinese history
