= Six Kingdoms =

Six Kingdoms may refer to:

- In biology, a scheme of classifying organisms into six kingdoms:
  - Proposed by Carl Woese et al.: Animalia, Plantae, Fungi, Protista, Archaea/Archaeabacteria, and Bacteria/Eubacteria
  - Proposed by Thomas Cavalier-Smith: Animalia, Plantae, Fungi, Chromista, Protozoa and Eukaryota
- In Chinese history, six of the Seven Warring States that formed an alliance but were still conquered by Qin: Qi, Chu, Yan, Han, Zhao, and Wei

== See also ==
- Six Dynasties
