= Three Qins =

Kingdoms in the Qin-Han interregnum

Conquest of the Three Qins
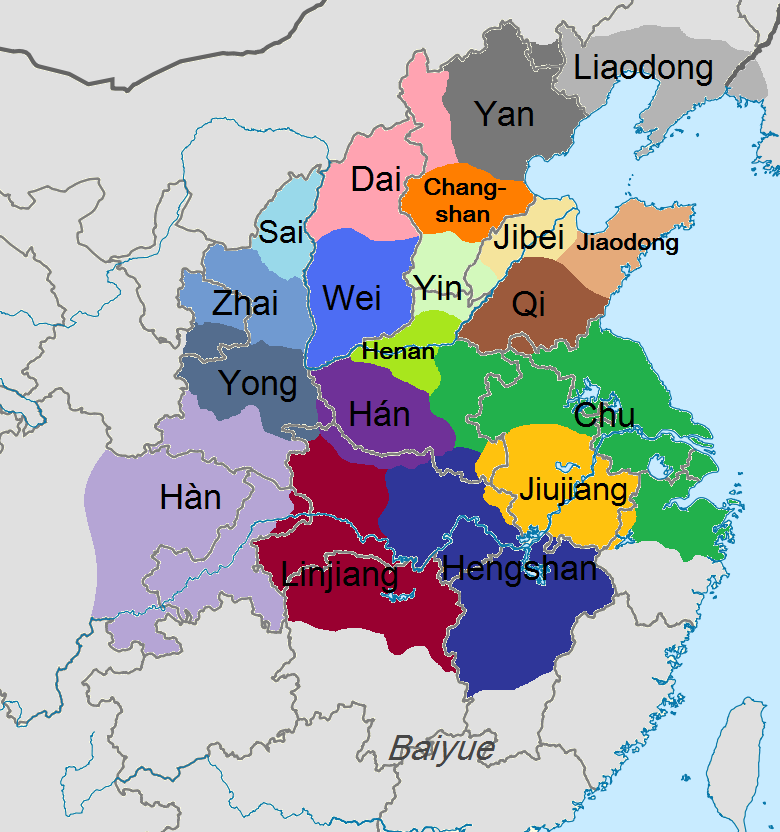
- Approximate location of the Eighteen Kingdoms
Date	August–September 206 BC, June 205 BC
Location	Guanzhong
Result	Han victory

Belligerents
Kingdom of Han	Kingdom of Yong; Kingdom of Sai; Kingdom of Zhai

Commanders and leaders
Han Xin; Liu Bang; Cao Shen; Fan Kuai; Guan Ying; Zhou Bo; Jin Xi; Li Shang	Zhang Han †; Sima Xin (surrendered); Dong Yi (surrendered); Zhang Ping (POW); Zhao Ben; Neishi Bao; Yao Rui

Strength
Less than 40,000	Unknown

The Three Qins (Chinese: 三秦; pinyin: Sān Qín) refer to three of the Eighteen Kingdoms (Yong, Sai and Zhai), the short-lived power-sharing arrangement formed in 206 BC after the collapse of the Qin dynasty. The three kingdoms were located in Guanzhong Plain (in present-day central Shaanxi), the heartland of the Qin Empire.

== Background ==
In late 208 BC the rebel king of Chu, King Huai II, promised that whoever invaded Guanzhong first would rule the region. In late 207 the Chu rebel Liu Bang became the first anti-Qin rebel to enter the Guanzhong region, capturing the Qin capital Xianyang and receiving the surrender of Ziying, the last king of Qin. He also won the support of the people of Guanzhong by abolishing the harsh Qin laws and by forbidding his troops from killing and robbing the locals. For these reasons, Liu Bang had a strong claim to Guanzhong, which was grain-rich, populous, easily defensible and ideal for expansion into China's Central Plain.

However, the Chu rebel Xiang Yu, the most powerful rebel warlord at the time and Liu Bang's rival, ignored Huai's promise, and in January 206 he instead gave Liu the former Qin territories of Hanzhong, Ba and Shu in present-day Sichuan, which he would rule as the king of Han. Ba and Shu were grain-rich, but they were remote from the rest of China. Xiang Yu allowed Liu Bang to take only 30,000 soldiers to go with him to Hanzhong, although 10,000 further men from Chu and other states voluntarily joined his army. Liu Bang's army marched south across the Qinling Mountains, following the Ziwu Road to Hanzhong. After reaching the Han River Basin in Hanzhong, Liu Bang, on the advice of his advisor Zhang Liang, burned the wooden gallery road to prove his commitment to follow Xiang Yu's orders and remain within his own dominion.

Xiang Yu wished to rule his Chu homeland rather than Guanzhong, and so he divided the region between three former Qin generals who had surrendered to Xiang Yu after the Battle of Yushui River back in July 207. The former General-in-Chief of Qin, Zhang Han, received the kingdom of Yong (雍), occupying present-day central Shaanxi. Xiang Yu's intention to use Zhang Han was partly influenced by the latter's exceptional successes as a general. In 209 Zhang Han had trained an army of convicts to fight the rebels, saved Xianyang and Xingyang and annihilated the rebel armies of Zhou Wen, Wu Guang and the overall rebel leader Chen Sheng (the King of "Rising Chu"). In 208 he defeated and killed the new overall rebel leader Xiang Liang (Xiang Yu's uncle) and also defeated Tian Dan, Zhou Shi, Wei Jiu, Tian Rong and Chen Yu. In 207 he surrendered to Xiang Yu after discovering that the Qin Prime Minister Zhao Gao intended to have him executed and then suffering defeat at Yushui River, but Xiang Yu's army had been struggling as well due to food shortages, and Zhang Han had halted the Xiang's advance between the rebel victory at Julu in January 207 and Zhang's own surrender in July. Xiang Yu thus recognized Zhang Han's talent and tasked him with defending the passes of the Qinling Mountains should Liu Bang attempt to re-cross north into Guanzhong from Hanzhong to the south.

Xiang Yu also rewarded Zhang Han's former subordinates Sima Xin and Dong Yi. Sima Xin received the State of Sai (塞), occupying present-day northeastern Shaanxi, and Dong Yi received Zhai (翟), occupying present-day northern Shaanxi. These three kingdoms came to be collectively known as the Three Qins, since they occupied the heartland of the former Qin state.

== Liu Bang's Decision to Invade ==
Confronted by the sheer distance between Hanzhong and their homeland of Chu in eastern China, Liu Bang's army and its leadership suffered from supply shortages and mass desertions. However, this coincided with the rise of the officer Han Xin. A precocious young talent, Han Xin was well read on the art of war and vocal about his ideas and merits. Having served as a guard or junior officer in Xiang Yu's army, he had deserted Xiang Yu for Liu Bang because Xiang had refused to listen to his suggestions. He was recommended for promotion by Liu Bang's Minister Coachman Xiahou Ying, and in December 207 he and Zhang Liang presented gifts to Xiang Yu on Liu Bang's behalf after Liu fled the Feast at Swan Goose Gate.

In early 206 Han Xin was a logistics prefect, and in this capacity he impressed Liu Bang's Prime Minister Xiao He, perhaps because he performed exceptionally well in securing and transporting the food resources of Ba and Shu from the far south-west of China to the army's position in Hanzhong. Although Han Xin had never commanded an army, Xiao He argued vigorously in favour of giving Han Xin command of the army. Liu Bang not only made Han Xin a general, but strikingly, he made him his General-In-Chief, promoting him above generals like Cao Shen, Fan Kuai, Zhou Bo and Guan Ying, competent generals who had served under Liu since his original rebellion against Qin in 209 (or since 208 in the case of Guan Ying).

Han Xin soon urged Liu Bang to authorize an invasion of Guanzhong within a few months’ time. By conquering the Three Qins so quickly, they could capitalize on the fact that Zhang Han, Sima Xin and Dong Yi had not ruled the region for very long. As Han Xin argued and predicted, the people of Guanzhong would welcome Liu Bang as their king as they despised Xiang Yu for his brutality, they hated the fact that the former Qin generals had defected to Xiang Yu, and they respected Liu Bang for the clemency shown when he had first entered Guanzhong. Moreover, Xiang Yu was distracted by a war with the State of Qi that was gradually increasing in intensity. Han Xin argued that they could then use Guanzhong as a food-rich base with which to rapidly seize territories in the Central Plain (Guanzhong had seen much less warfare on its soil compared with other parts of China).

Liu Bang took Han Xin's advice. Zhang Han had manned the passes of the Qinling Mountains that divided Guanzhong from Hanzhong to the south, and so Han Xin began repairing Ziwu Road in the eastern part of the Qinling Mountains to give Zhang Han the false impression that the offensive would come from that direction.

== Campaign ==
In August 206 Han Xin launched the invasion. In addition to repairing Ziwu Road, Han Xin had a skeleton force threaten Zhang Han from that quarter. He also sent Fan Kuai with a diversionary force along Qishan Road in the far-west, who defeated the Assistant Prefect of Xi County north of the Pai River. For these reasons, Zhang Han was enticed into concentrating his main forces around the northern ends of these passes. Meanwhile, Han Xin and Liu Bang marched their main force along the less-used Chencang Road, which was one of the paths located between the Qishan and Ziwu Roads, near the south-west of the Guanzhong Plain. His forces quickly took control of the counties of Xiabian and Gudao and overwhelmed the Yong garrison manning the Sanguan Pass. Supposedly, Han Xin ordered Cao Shen to select fifty exceptional soldiers and order them to disguise themselves as woodcutters, enter the pass with other people and take the pass at midnight from within. The soldiers entered with heavy loads of firewood on their backs and hid themselves as night fell. Only a few Yong soldiers were guarding the gates of the pass at night, and the Han soldiers took out swords hidden within their loads of firewood. They killed the guards and opened the gates, allowing Han Xin to march on the town of Chencang on the southern edge of Guanzhong's Wei River Basin. Under attack by the Han army, the surprised garrison and its commander abandoned the town and reported the presence of the main Han army to Zhang Han.

Zhang Han sent envoys to his former subordinates, the kings Sima Xin and Dong Yi, asking for help. He and his brother Zhang Ping then marched against Han Xin's army but were defeated in a battle outside Chencang. Zhang Han retreated to his capital Feiqiu with the majority of his remaining force, and Zhang Ping led a smaller part of the army towards the city of Haozhi. Han Xin judged that they should attack Zhang Ping rather than try to take Feiqiu, since Feiqiu was a stronger city protected by a larger army than that under Zhang Ping, and Zhang Han was an especially formidable general. A siege of Feiqiu could stall the progress of the invasion and give Zhang Ping, Sima Xin, Dong Yi and Xiang Yu himself more opportunity to crush the Han army before they had taken control of much of Guanzhong. Therefore, Han Xin focused first on the walled towns of Yong and Tai. Fan Kuai reached the vicinity of Yong as well and defeated a force of cavalry and chariots to the south of the town before re-joining the main Han army. They captured the two towns, with Fan Kuai seizing the walls with his vanguard, and they then pursued Zhang Ping, defeating him in a battle outside Haozhi. Zhang Ping retreated within the walls and a siege ensued. Meanwhile, Han Xin and Cao Shen used part of the army to capture the town of Rang, to the east of Haozhi, and a Han detachment under Zhou Bo captured the county of Huali.

Sima Xin sent General Zhao Ben to reinforce Zhang Han in Feiqiu, and an army sent by Dong Yi arrived in the area of the Jingshui River. Zhang Han, who had likely hoped to distract Han Xin at Feiqiu, led the combined Yong, Sai and Zhai forces to relieve Haozhi. Previously, Zhang Han had won both the battles of Linji (208) and Dingtao (208) by making surprise marches against the enemy position after appearing to be at a disadvantage. However, this time Zhang Han was intercepted by Han Xin and Cao Shen east of Rang and suffered another defeat. Zhang Han returned to Feiqiu, and Zhao Ben withdrew further east to the former Qin capital Xianyang, which was being garrisoned by Sai troops under Neishi Bao. Han Xin and Cao Shen re-joined the Han forces at Haozhi, and Zhang Ping broke out of the encirclement. The Han army assaulted Haozhi, with Fan Kuai again leading a force onto the walls, and they captured the city, with the Prefect and Assistant Prefect of Haozhi killed in the fighting.

Instead of focusing on Feiqiu, the main Han army then marched past the city towards Xianyang further to the east. The Sai army under Zhao Ben and Neishi Bao left the city to do battle with Han Xin but were defeated and fled east, causing Xianyang as well as the counties of Mei, Huaili and Liuchung to surrender. Liu Bang renamed Xianyang Xincheng, and the Han army garrisoned Jingling further to the east. Jingling's proximity to Yueyang, the capital of Sai, prompted Sima Xin to lead the main Sai army to besiege Jingling, where he was joined by the forces under Zhang Ping. The Han garrison in Jingling defended the city for twenty days and then sallied out and defeated the Sai-Yong coalition, causing it to retreat. Cao Shen was one of the generals in the city, and Han Xin was either within the city as well or assisted from outside. Zhang Ping retreated north to Qi, where he joined forces with a Zhai force under Yao Rui, but they were defeated by a Han detachment under Zhou Bo, who then marched west to pacify the county of Dian. Zhang Ping retreated to Longxi Commandery in the far west.

A Han detachment under Guan Ying approached Yueyang, and Sima Xin, having lost too many soldiers, surrendered. Liu Bang subsequently moved his headquarters from Nanzheng in Hanzhong to Yueyang. Meanwhile, part of the Han army encircled Feiqiu, with Zhou Bo and Guan Ying among the generals present. The Han general Jin Xi defeated what remained of Zhang Ping's force and took control of Longxi Commandery, and the Han general Li Shang took control of the Beidi and Shangchun Commanderies in the north, defeating a Yong general at Yenchih, a force under Zhou Lei at Xunyi, and a force under Su Tsu at Niyang. The main Han army marched north-east to Gaonu, the capital of Zhai, where Dong Yi surrendered without a fight.

== Aftermath ==
Although Feiqiu remained under siege, by September Guanzhong had become the administrative centre of Liu Bang's growing dominion, and in October he began expanding into the Central Plain, annexing the State of Henan in that month, the State of Han in November, and the States of Western Wei and Yin in March 205. In April he used Xiang Yu's assassination of King Huai II of Chu in October 206 to launch a full-scale war against Xiang Yu for control over China (see the Chu-Han Contention). That same month, in alliance with the State of Zhao, Liu Bang briefly seized Xiang's capital city, Pengcheng, while Xiang was still campaigning in Qi.

By June Han Xin had taken command of the siege of Feiqiu, and he ordered Fan Kuai to dig a channel from the Wei River to divert water to the mudbrick walls of the city. This caused a section of the walls to soften and collapse after a few days, and as the Han troops entered the city, Zhang Han committed suicide. The three states of Qin thus became three prefectures.

After Liu's victory in the Chu-Han contention, the Guanzhong region became the crown land of the newly established Han dynasty, with Chang'an being the imperial capital, located merely miles away from the former Qin capital of Xianyang on the opposite side of the Wei River.

== See also ==
- Timeline of the Chu–Han Contention
- Guanzhong
