= Shen Yang (Eighteen Kingdoms) =

- Traditional Chinese: 申陽
- Simplified Chinese: 申阳
Transcriptions
Standard Mandarin
- Hanyu Pinyin: Shēn Yáng

Shen Yang was the ruler of the Kingdom of Henan (河南國) of the Eighteen Kingdoms during the Chu–Han Contention, an interregnum between the Qin and Hàn dynasties of China.

A native of Xiaqiu (瑕丘; present-day Yanzhou District, Jining, Shandong), Shen Yang was originally a subordinate of Zhang Er, the chancellor of the insurgent Zhao kingdom. After the fall of the Qin dynasty in 206 BC, Xiang Yu divided the former Qin Empire into the Eighteen Kingdoms. Shen Yang was appointed by Xiang Yu as the King of Henan and granted part of the former Hán kingdom's territory as his domain. In 205 BC, Shen Yang surrendered to Liu Bang and his kingdom became the Henan Commandery of the Hàn Empire.

Chinese royalty
Preceded by None	King of Henan; 206 BC – 205 BC	Vacant
