= Four Whiteheads of Mount Shang =

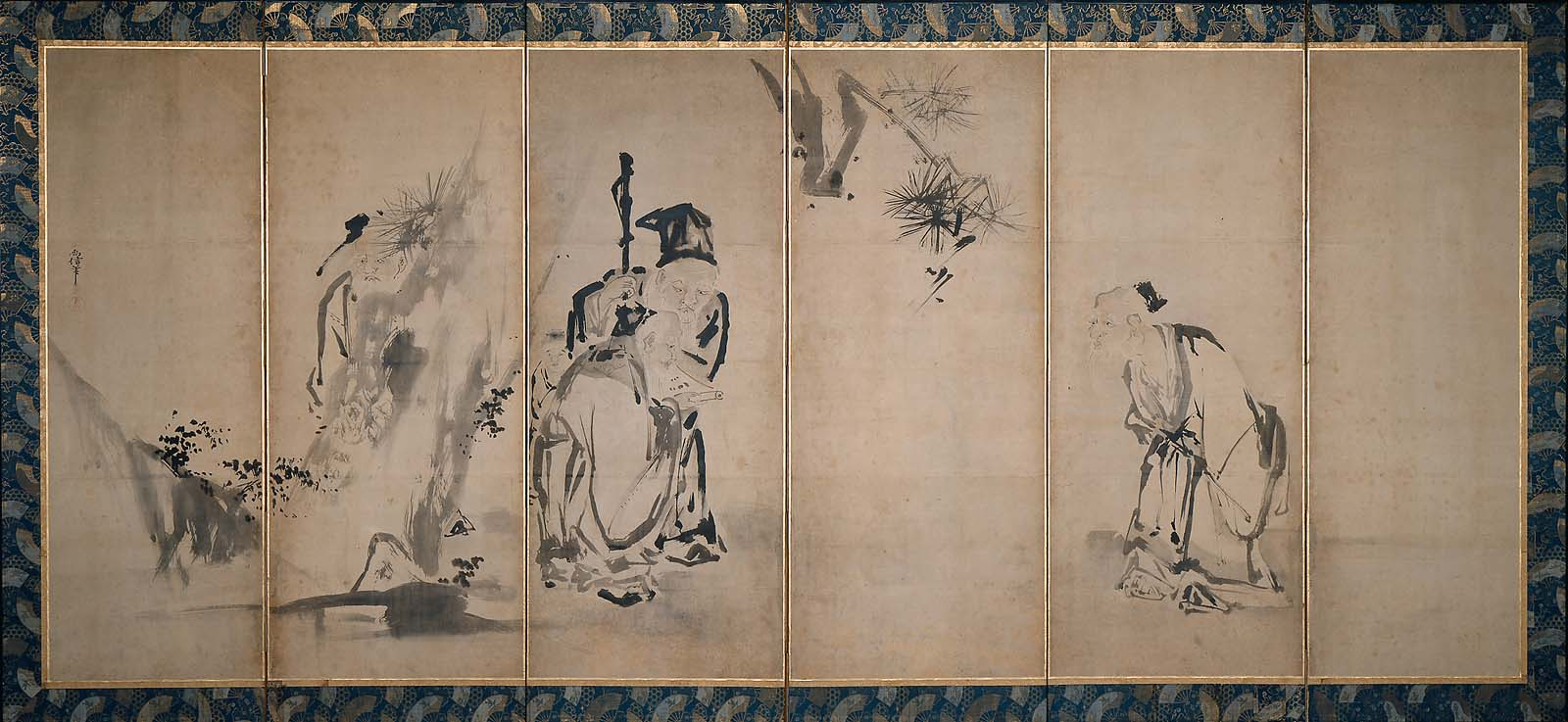
"The Four Sages of Mount Shang": Kanō Naonobu (17th century Japan)

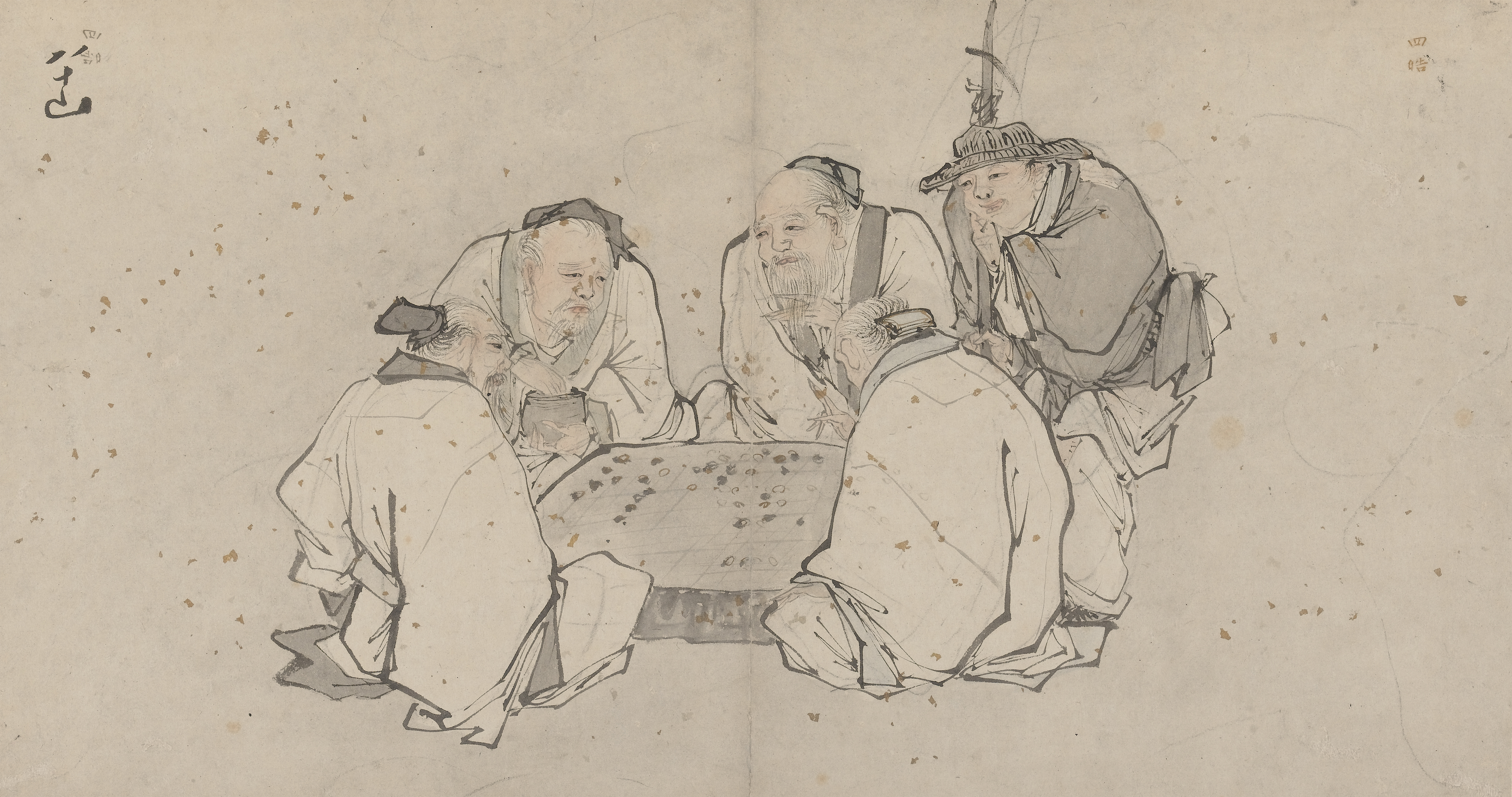
Four Sages of Mount Shang, painting by Zhang Lu (1464–1538)

The Four Whiteheads of Mount Shang (Chinese: 商山四皓; pinyin: Shāng Shān Sì Hào) were four elders who had an important role in the establishment of the Han dynasty of China (206 BCE – 220 CE).

Liu Ying (Emperor Hui of Han, 210–188 BCE) became the second emperor of the Chinese Han dynasty. When his father (the Emperor Gaozu of Han), the previous emperor, died of an arrow wound, Liu Ying became emperor because his father had named him crown prince and heir to the throne.

This was a most notable moment, because the founding of the Han dynasty affected the entire history of China. Han Huidi was important because he represented the dynastic succession of the Liu family as the Han dynasty. His father named him crown prince and heir due to the influence of the Four Whiteheads of Mount Shang. These men were considered sages: they were called "whiteheads" because they were elders with white hair and white beards.

== Dynastic determinations ==
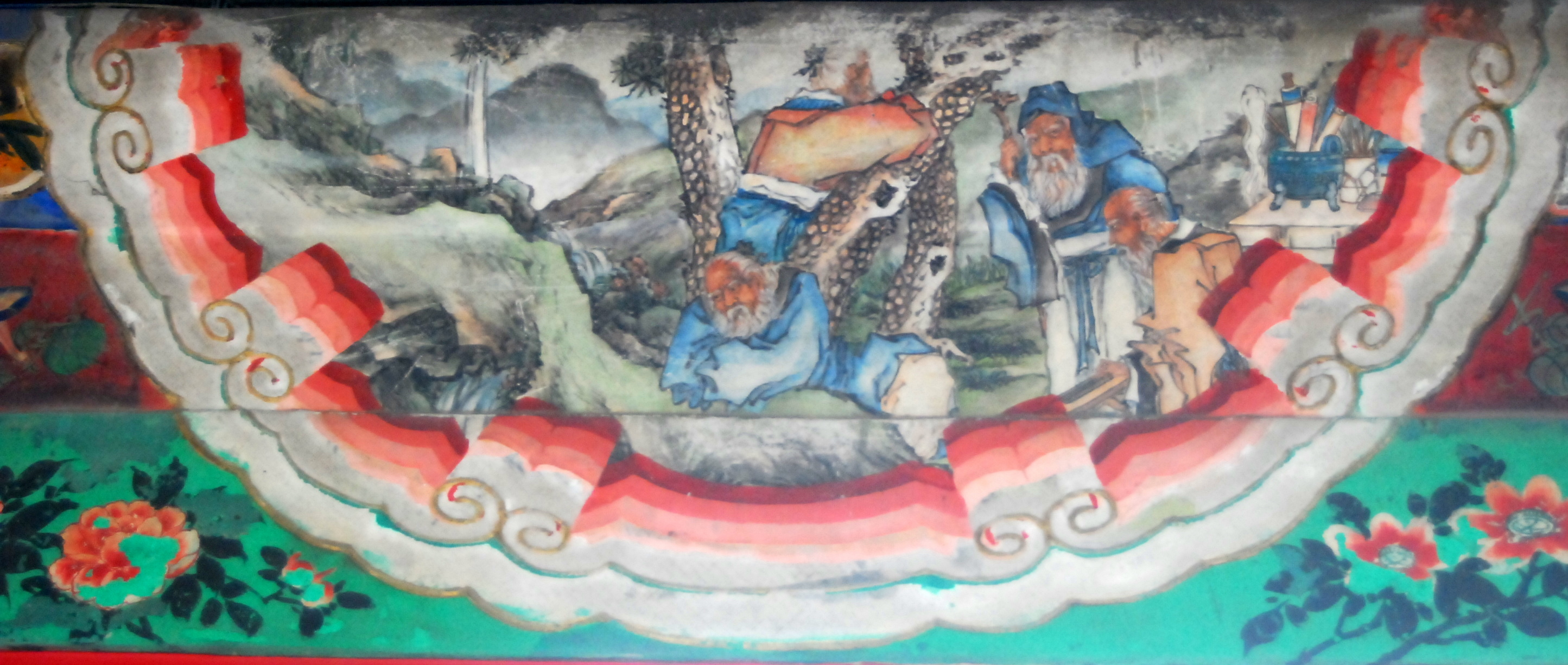
"Shangshan Four Hermits" from the Long Corridor

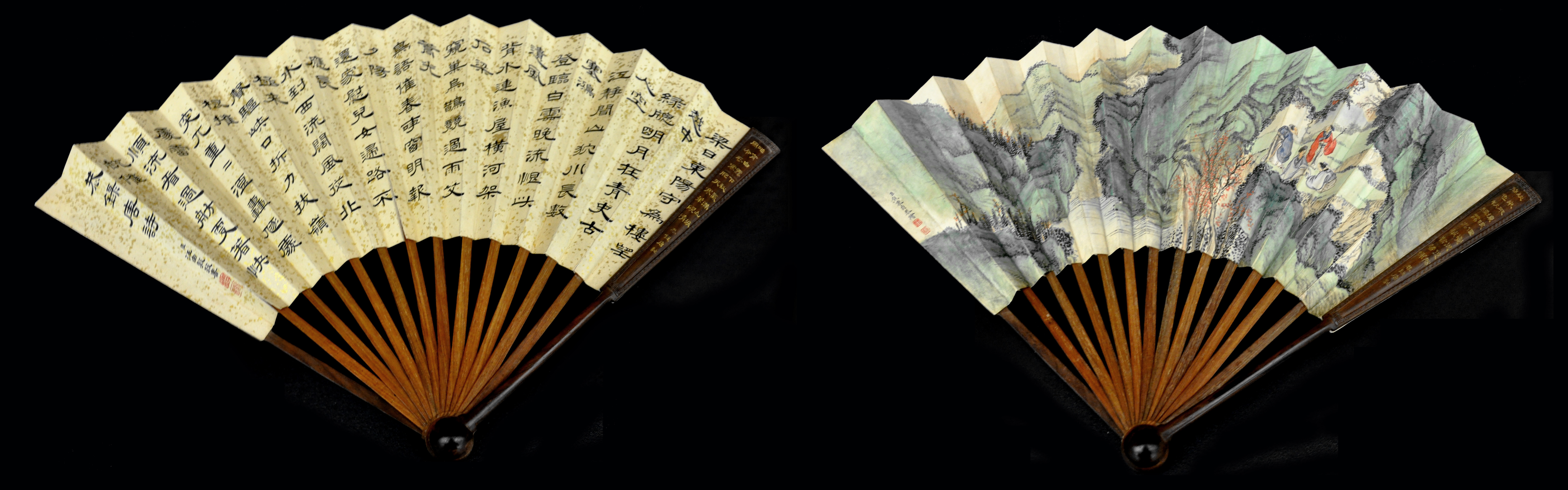
"Four Whiteheads of Mount Shang", depicted on fan

Soon after establishing the Han dynasty, the new emperor, Emperor Gaozu of Han, was eager to recruit talented persons. In 196 BCE Gao even issued a decree to the effect that any official knowing of a virtuous man must so report on penalty of being fired (unless that man were too old or sick). Sometime before or after that, Gao attempted to obtain the services of the Four Whiteheads of Mount Shang: Master Dongyuan, Qi Liji, Master Xiahuang and Mr. Lu Li. ("Huang and Qi", 黃綺, was a poetic shorthand for these four, as used by Tao Yuanming.) During the time of troubles which characterized the Qin dynasty (221 to 206 BCE), these four had entered into a life of seclusion on Mount Shang. They were old and had white hair and beards: thus they were known as the Four Whiteheads of Mount Shang. Liu Bang (the future emperor Han Gaodi) was well aware of the reputation of these four sages, and when he became emperor Gao, the four refused his ardent entreaties to assume positions of importance in his newly established government. When the question of who was to be imperial heir came up, two of Gaodi's women both advocated for their own son: Lu Hou for Ying and Qi for her own son. Gao favored Qi's son, as he thought the youth embodied more of his personality. Lü Hou (Empress Lü) got the advantage: she went to the powerful official Zhang Liang, who said, “His Majesty had long heard about the Four Whiteheads of Mount Shang and wanted to invite them to serve the country. However, they refused. If the Crown Prince could obtain the support of the Four Whiteheads of Mount Shang, then His Majesty would not depose him.” Lu Hou then applied her forces of persuasion. The Four Whiteheads of Mount Shang showed up at court. The four agreed that according to the Confucian precepts of filial piety, as the elder son the future Huidi should succeed to the rulership, and that furthermore Liu Ying's nature was benevolent and compassionate. Gaodi noticed the presence of four elders with white hair and white beards at his court, and inquired as to their identity. Upon finding out who they were and what their position was, Gaodi went to Lady Qi and told her: “I cannot appoint your son as the successor because the Crown Prince has already obtained the support of such capable people. His position is firmly entrenched.”

Thus the future direction of the Han dynasty was determined. (Note: In his Zizhi Tongjian Kaoyi, Sima Guang was skeptical of this account. He opinioned that given Liu Bang's tenacious personality, he would not easily change his mind due to criticism from others; the main reason why Liu Bang did not make Liu Ruyi taizi was that Liu Bang feared that after his death, Ruyi would not be able to receive support from court officials. If Liu Bang really wanted to make Ruyi taizi, as someone who had been close to Liu Bang for many years, Zhang Liang was right in his observation that it would take more than a few words to change Liu Bang's mind; so, how can a few words from four old men of the woods convince Liu Bang? If the "Four Whiteheads" could affect the succession, Liu Bang would have killed them, and not lament to Lady Qi. Also, even if the "Four Whiteheads" did convince Liu Bang to alter the succession, it would be an example of Zhang Liang providing assistance to Liu Ruyi against the latter's father, which is something Zhang would not have done. Thus, Sima did not include the account of the "Four Whiteheads" in Zizhi Tongjian, just like he did not include the account of Qin not attacking the Hangu Pass for 15 years after Su Qin had canvassed the other Six States, and the account of the Qin army retreating for 50 li after Lu Zhonglian persuaded Xinyuan Yan. Sima Guang also criticized Sima Qian for including these three accounts in his Shiji due to the latter's propensity in believing incredible accounts.)

== See also ==
- Emperor Gaozu of Han
- Emperor Hui of Han
- Empress Lü
- Family tree of the Han dynasty
- Zhang Liang (Western Han)

== Reference citations ==
=== Standard Chinese secondary reference sources ===
These Classical Chinese historical sources are standard on this topic, and incorporated herein:

- Sima Tan and Sima Qian. Records of the Grand Historian, vol. 9 (on or around 94 BCE).
- Ban Biao, Ban Gu, and Ban Zhao. Book of Han, vol. 2 (111 CE).
- Sima Guang, et al. Zizhi Tongjian (Comprehensive Mirror in Aid of Governance), vols. 9, 11, 12 (1084).
