= Jin Xi (Han) =

Jin Xi (Chinese: 靳歙; pinyin: Jìn Xī; died 182 BC) was a general under Emperor Liu Bang. In 209 BC, Jin "joined in the attack on Qin forces, defeating Li You", for which Jin received various titles and honors from Liu Bang including being named Commandant of Cavalry. In this capacity, in 206 BC, Jin "took part in the pacification of the Qin metropolitan area", and in 202 BC, during the Chu–Han Contention, Jin conquered the Kingdom of Linjiang of the Eighteen Kingdoms, capturing its ruler, Gong Wei, who was then escorted to Luoyang and executed. Jin was further rewarded for this and other military victories in the period, being "nominated as Marquis of Xinwu (lit. honest and martial)".
