= Dong Yi (Qin dynasty) =

Dong Yi 董翳

King of Di 翟王
- Tenure: 206 BC
- Born: Unknown
- Died: 204 BC; Sishui Town, Xingyang, Henan

Dong Yi (died 204 BC) was a Chinese military general of the Qin dynasty. Between 209 and 208 BC, when uprisings against the Qin dynasty broke out, Dong Yi, along with Zhang Han and Sima Xin, led Qin forces into battle against the various rebel groups and defeated some of them. However, they lost to rebel forces led by Xiang Yu in 207 BC at the Battle of Julu and were forced to surrender. After the rebels overthrew the Qin dynasty in 206 BC, China was divided into the Eighteen Kingdoms and the three surrendered Qin generals were made kings – Zhang Han as the King of Yong, Sima Xin as the King of Sai, and Dong Yi as the King of Di. Their three kingdoms were collectively known as the Three Qins since they occupied the Guanzhong region, the heartland of the Qin state during the Warring States period. In 205 BC, Liu Bang, the King of Han, invaded Zhang Han's kingdom and defeated Zhang Han in battle. Sima Xin and Dong Yi initially surrendered to Liu Bang, but defected to Xiang Yu after the Battle of Pengcheng. In 204 BC, Sima Xin and Dong Yi joined Xiang Yu's subordinate Cao Jiu in fighting Liu Bang's forces during the Battle of Chenggao, but they were defeated and all three of them committed suicide.

== Life ==
Dong Yi was allegedly a descendant of Dong Hu (董狐), a notable historian of the Jin state during the Spring and Autumn period. He started his career as a military officer serving under the Qin dynasty and held the position of a Commandant (都尉).

In 209 BC, the Dazexiang uprising broke out under the leadership of Chen Sheng and Wu Guang and sparked off a series of rebellions against the Qin dynasty throughout China. The rebel groups claimed to be restoring the former six states which were conquered between 230 and 221 BC by the Qin state, the precursor of the Qin dynasty. Zhou Wen (周文), one of Chen Sheng's deputies, managed to lead a vanguard force that came close to Xianyang, the Qin capital, alarming the emperor Qin Er Shi, who called for a meeting with his subjects to discuss how to counter the rebels. Zhang Han, then holding the position of Minister Steward (少府), suggested to the emperor to grant amnesty to the convicts serving as labourers at the Mausoleum of the First Qin Emperor, and recruit them to serve in the Qin army. The emperor approved Zhang Han's proposal and appointed him as a general, putting him in charge of leading Qin forces to fight the rebels. Zhang Han defeated and drove back Zhou Wen, who committed suicide. The emperor then sent Sima Xin and Dong Yi to serve as Zhang Han's deputies.

The Qin forces under Zhang Han's command continued to advance eastward and destroyed Chen Sheng's rebel group. Zhang Han then led his troops to attack the Wei rebel group, defeating them along with their reinforcements from the Qi rebel group. After that, Zhang Han moved on to attack Tian Rong (田榮), the leader of the Qi rebel group, prompting Tian Rong to seek help from Xiang Liang, the leader of the Chu rebel group. Zhang Han then engaged Xiang Liang at the Battle of Dingtao; Xiang Liang was defeated and killed in battle.

In 207 BC, when Zhang Han attacked and besieged the Zhao rebel group at Julu, the Zhao leader Zhao Xie (趙歇) sought help from the Chu rebel group. King Huai II, the nominal leader of the Chu rebel group, sent Xiang Liang's nephew, Xiang Yu, to assist their fellow rebels. Xiang Yu defeated Zhang Han at the Battle of Julu despite being heavily outnumbered. When Zhang Han sent Sima Xin to request reinforcements from Xianyang, the emperor refused to send aid after being deceived by Zhao Gao. Sima Xin escaped from Zhao Gao's assassins on his return journey and reported to Zhang Han that the Qin government had fallen under Zhao Gao's control. Zhang Han, along with his deputies and 200,000 troops, ultimately surrendered to Xiang Yu.

After the fall of the Qin dynasty in 206 BC, Xiang Yu divided the former Qin Empire into the Eighteen Kingdoms. Zhang Han, Sima Xin and Dong Yi were made the rulers of three of the Eighteen Kingdoms. The three kingdoms were known as the Three Qins because they occupied the lands of the former Qin state in the Guanzhong region. Later that year, the forces of Liu Bang, the King of Han, invaded Guanzhong and captured Zhang Han's kingdom in a surprise attack. Dong Yi and Sima Xin then surrendered to Liu Bang.

In 205 BC during the Chu–Han Contention, after Liu Bang was defeated by Xiang Yu at the Battle of Pengcheng, Dong Yi and Sima Xin defected to Xiang Yu's side. The following year, Dong Yi and Sima Xin joined Xiang Yu's subordinate Cao Jiu (曹咎) in resisting an attack by Liu Bang's forces during the Battle of Chenggao. Liu Bang managed to lure Xiang Yu's forces into an ambush near the Si River and defeated them. Dong Yi, along with Sima Xin and Cao Jiu, committed suicide after their defeat.

Chinese royalty
Preceded by None	King of Di; 206 BC	Succeeded by None
