= Guanzhong =

Historical region of China

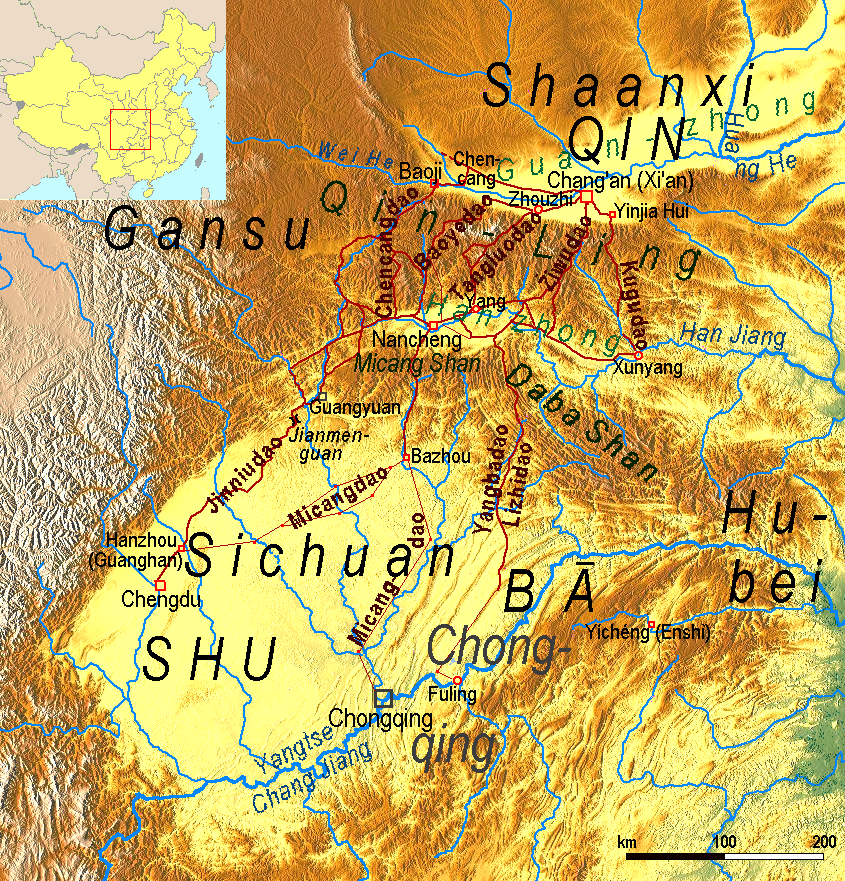
- Map of Shudao (Roads to Shu), Guanzhong is the valley at the top right
- Traditional Chinese: 關中
- Simplified Chinese: 关中
- Literal meaning: Inside the Pass
Transcriptions
Standard Mandarin
- Hanyu Pinyin: Guānzhōng
- Wade–Giles: Kuan^{1}-chung^{1}

Guanzhong (Chinese: 关中, formerly romanised as Kwanchung) region, also known as the Guanzhong Basin, Wei River Basin, or uncommonly as the Shaanzhong region, is a historical region of China corresponding to the crescentic graben basin within present-day central Shaanxi, bounded between the Qinling Mountains in the south (known as Guanzhong's "South Mountains"), and the Huanglong Mountain, Meridian Ridge and Long Mountain ranges in the north (collectively known as its "North Mountains"). The central flatland area of the basin, known as the Guanzhong Plain (关中平原; pinyin: Guānzhōng Píngyuán), is made up of alluvial plains along the lower Wei River and its numerous tributaries and thus also called the Wei River Plain. The region is part of the Jin-Shaan Basin Belt, a prominent section of the Shanxi Rift System, and is separated from its geological sibling — the Yuncheng Basin to its northeast — by the Yellow River section southwest of the Lüliang Mountains and north of the river's bend at the tri-provincial junction among Shaanxi, Shanxi and Henan.

The name Guanzhong means "within the passes", referring to the four major mountain pass fortresses historically defending the region. The region was the traditional heartland of Qin state during Zhou dynasty and thus often nicknamed the "800 li of Qin land". The Yellow River, Lüliang Mountains and the eastern end of the Qinling separate the region from the (then) politically orthodox Central Plain, which is located east of the strategic Hangu Pass and therefore was historically referred as the Guandong ("east of the pass") region by the Qin people, who later conquered the eastern states and unified China as a centralized empire — the Qin dynasty — for the first time during the 3rd century BC. Afterwards, subsequent prominent dynasties such as the Han and Tang (both considered China's historical golden ages) also had the crownland established in the Guanzhong region.

== Geography ==
The Guanzhong Plain traditionally includes the central part of modern Shaanxi province and the extreme northwestern tip of Henan province (the western half of Sanmenxia). The average altitude of the region ranges from 300 to 700 m (980 to 2,300 ft) above sea level. Xi'an, the provincial capital of Shaanxi and the largest city in Northwest China, is located at the center of the region, mostly south of the Wei River. Other major prefectural cities in the Guanzhong region include (from west to east) Baoji, Xianyang, Tongchuan and Weinan.

The four major historic fortifications that enclose Guanzhong region are:

- Hangu Pass (函谷關) to the east, in present-day Lingbao City;
- Wu Pass (武關) to the southeast, in present-day Danfeng County;
- Xiao Pass (蕭關) to the northwest, in present-day Jingyuan County, and;
- Dasan Pass (大散關) to the west, in present-day Chencang District.

Two more passes were later added, namely:

- Tong Pass (潼關) further to the east, built during the late Eastern Han dynasty by the warlord Cao Cao, in present-day Tongguan County, and;
- Jinsuo Pass (金鎖關) to the north, built during the Tang dynasty, in present-day Yintai District.

Historically the most important fortress of the above passes was the Hangu Pass, which commanded the chokepoint on a narrow land corridor along the south bank of Yellow River and what was then the only traversable passage into the Guanzhong region from the North China Plain. The formidable resilience of the Hangu Pass was what enabled the Qin state to defeat numerous anti-Qin alliances formed by its eastern enemy states during the Warring States period.

=== Climate ===
The average annual temperature is around 13 °C (55 °F), and the annual rainfall ranges from 400 to 900 mm (16 to 35 in), averaging around 600 mm. Because some years have low precipitation and evaporation rates are high, the region's natural vegetation is a mix between forests and steppes. Before human settlements converted the plains for agriculture, it was home to a diverse range of wildlife.

== History ==
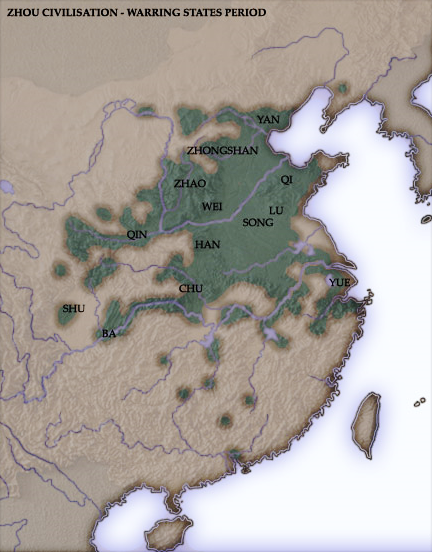
China during the warring states period. Guanzhong (Qin) is the southeast corner of the rectangle formed by the Yellow and Wei rivers.

The Guanzhong region became the heartland of the Zhou after Jī clan leader Gugong Danfu relocated his people south from Bin (modern day Binzhou, Shaanxi) to evade the violent raidings by Xunyu, Xianyun and Di nomads. It is from Guanzhong region that the Zhou state prospered and eventually conquered the Shang dynasty to establish the Zhou dynasty in 1046 BC.

After the Quanrong nomads, with collaboration from Marquess of Shen, killed King You of Zhou and sacked the Zhou capital Haojing in 771 BC, the Western Zhou dynasty collapsed and the surviving Zhou court fled east to Luoyi. The Yíng clan, then a minor marcher vassal based in the Longxi Basin as a buffer state on the western frontier of the Chinese civilization, sent troops to escort King Ping of Zhou along the journey. In gratitude, King Ping granted a mid-level nobility to the Yíng leader, Count Xiang, and promised him authority to permanently claim any lands his clan can recapture from the nomads. The resultant Qin state then spent the next few centuries fighting off various nomads to its north and west and eventually consolidated its base in the Guanzhong Plain and the Loess Plateau. The Qin capital then relocated progressively east from Qinyi (in modern Qingshui County, Gansu) to Yong (in modern Fengxiang County, Shaanxi), then to Yueyang (in modern Yanliang District of Xi'an, Shaanxi), and eventually to Xianyang northeast across the Wei River from the ruined old Zhou capital of Fenghao. Four passes were then built to defend this new heartland against hostile attacks from both the east and the west.

During the Warring States period, Qin grew powerful under Shang Yang's legalist reforms, and militarily became increasingly more successful, and its rivals to the east claimed that the Qin army was a "troop of tigers and wolves", and it was often said that "Guanzhong produces generals; Guandong produces ministers". After constructing irrigation systems such as Zhengguo Canal, the already fertile Guanzhong region became extremely productive, allowing Qin state to become the preeminent power, repeatedly defeating and seizing more territory from its rivals to the east, and eventually unified China and established the Qin dynasty in 221 BC.

After First Emperor's death, the Qin dynasty soon fell into chaos due to the corrupt rule of Qin Er Shi and Zhao Gao, and various rebellions broke out. In 206 BC, the rebel leader Liu Bang successfully invaded Guanzhong and forced the last Qin ruler, Ziying, to surrender the capital Xianyang, ending the Qin dynasty. Liu Bang entered the capital peacefully, and issued strict orders forbidding his troops from looting and harming the locals. However, he was forced to hand control over to another more powerful rebel leader Xiang Yu, who sacked, pillaged and torched Xianyang before enfeoffing the Guanzhong region to three surrendered Qin generals Zhang Han, Sima Xin and Dong Yi, collectively known as the "Three Qins". However, merely four months later, Liu Bang returned with his newly appointed generalissimo Han Xin and reconquered the Guanzhong region, and used it as his base to eventually defeat Xiang Yu in the subsequent civil war. After establishing the Han dynasty, Liu Bang created a new capital named Chang'an, which is just across the Wei River from the ruined Qin capital Xianyang.

Since the Western Zhou dynasty, the area was the capital region of China for a total of 12 dynasties including the Qin, Western Han, Sui, and Tang. By the Tang dynasty the economic center of China had shifted south to the Yangtze basin and Guanzhong became increasingly dependent on supplies transported via the Grand Canal. After the destruction of Chang'an in the last years of the Tang, Guanzhong became less significant politically as well as economically in later dynasties.

== See also ==
- Three Qins
- Guanzhong Hua
- Wei River
