= Eighteen Kingdoms =

Kingdoms in the Qin-Han interregnum

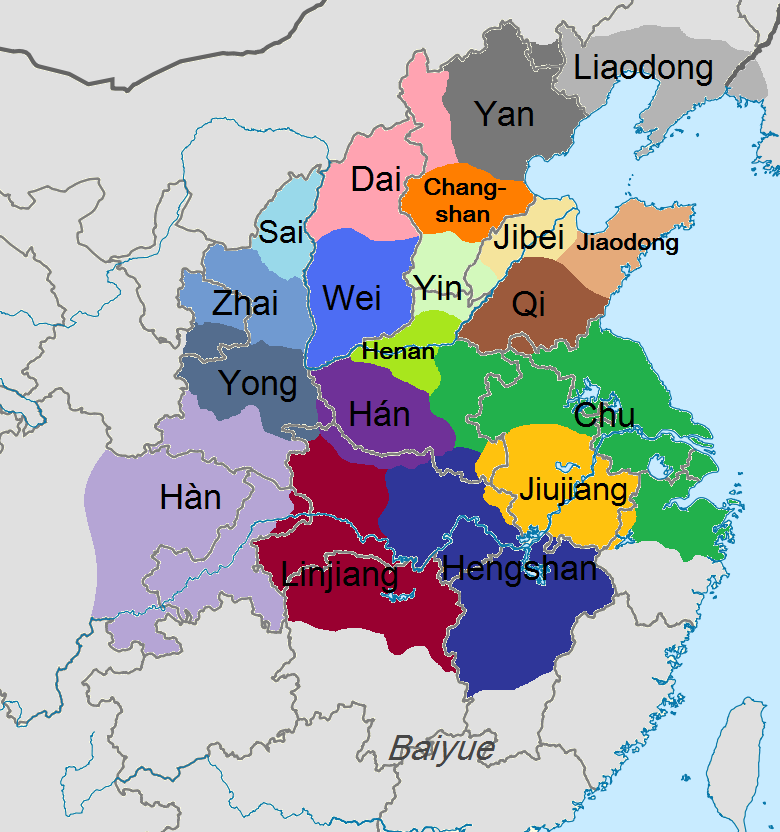
Approximate location of the Eighteen Kingdoms.

The historiographical term "Eighteen Kingdoms" (Chinese: 十八國), also translated as "Eighteen States", refers to the eighteen fengjian states in China created by military leader Xiang Yu in 206 BCE, after the collapse of the Qin dynasty. The establishment and abolition of the Eighteen Kingdoms marked the beginning and end of a turbulent interregnum known as the Chu–Han Contention.

The details of the feudal division are as follows:

Name	Name (Chinese)	Ruler	Areas covered (in present-day China)	Fate
Western Chu	西楚	Xiang Yu	Jiangsu, northern Anhui, northern Zhejiang, eastern and southern Henan	Defeated by Liu Bang
Hàn	漢/汉	Liu Bang	Sichuan, Chongqing, southern Shaanxi	
Yong (Note: Yong, Sai and Di were collectively known as the Three Qins because they occupied the area of the former Qin state, better known as Guanzhong.)	雍	Zhang Han (Qin general)	central Shaanxi, and eastern Gansu	Defeated by Liu Bang
Sai	塞	Sima Xin (Qin general)	northeastern Shaanxi	Defeated by Liu Bang
Di(zhai)	翟	Dong Yi (Qin general)	northern Shaanxi	Defeated by Liu Bang
Hengshan	衡山	Wu Rui (Qin official supported by Yue tribes)	eastern Hubei, Jiangxi	Allies with Liu Bang
Hán	韓	Han Cheng (Hán royalty)	southwestern Henan	
Zhao, briefly called Dai (Note: Zhao had existed before Xiang Yu's enfeoffment with Zhao Xie as king. It was split into Changshan and Dai, with Zhao Xie becoming the King of Dai. In 205 BCE, Changshan was destroyed, and Zhao was restored with Zhao Xie as King of Zhao.)	趙/代	Zhao Xie (Zhao royalty)	northern Shanxi, northwestern Hebei	Defeated by Liu Bang
Henan	河南	Shen Yang (Zhao official)	northwestern Henan	
Changshan	常山	Zhang Er (Zhao vice chancellor)	central Hebei	Allies with Liu Bang
Yin	殷	Sima Ang (Zhao general)	northern Henan, southern Hebei	Allies with Liu Bang
Western Wei	西魏	Wei Bao (Wei royalty)	southern Shanxi	Defeated by Liu Bang
Jiujiang	九江	Ying Bu (Chu general)	central and southern Anhui	Allies with Liu Bang (surrendered, originally a Chu general)
Linjiang	臨江	Gong Ao (Chu general)	western Hubei, northern Hunan	
Yan	燕	Zang Tu (Yan general)	northern Hebei, Beijing, Tianjin	Allies with Liu Bang
Liaodong	遼東	Han Guang (Yan royalty)	southern Liaoning	Surrendered to Liu Bang
Qi (Note: Jiaodong, Qi and Jibei were collectively known as the Three Qis because they occupied the area of the former Qi state.)	齊 or 齐	Tian Du (Qi general)	western and central Shandong	Defeated by Liu Bang
Jiaodong	膠東	Tian Fu (Qi royalty)	eastern Shandong	
Jibei	濟北	Tian An (Qi rebel leader)	northern Shandong	

The Eighteen Kingdoms were short-lived. Almost immediately, Tian Rong, dissatisfied with the fact that he was given no domain, rebelled and seized power in Qi, after which he conquered Jiaodong and Jibei, reuniting the old Qi state. Meanwhile, Xiang Yu had Emperor Yi of Chu and King Han Cheng of Hán killed. Thereafter, Liu Bang of Hàn conquered the lands of the Three Qins, thereby formally starting the Chu–Han Contention. Following many battles and changing alliances, Han defeated Chu and subdued all other kingdoms, where Liu Bang appointed vassal kings while making himself the first Emperor of the Han dynasty in 202 BCE.

== See also ==
- Fengjian
- Ancient Chinese states
- Kings of the Han dynasty
