= Emperor Gaozu of Han =

Founder and Emperor of Han Dynasty of China from 202 to 195 BC

Emperor Gaozu of Han 漢高祖
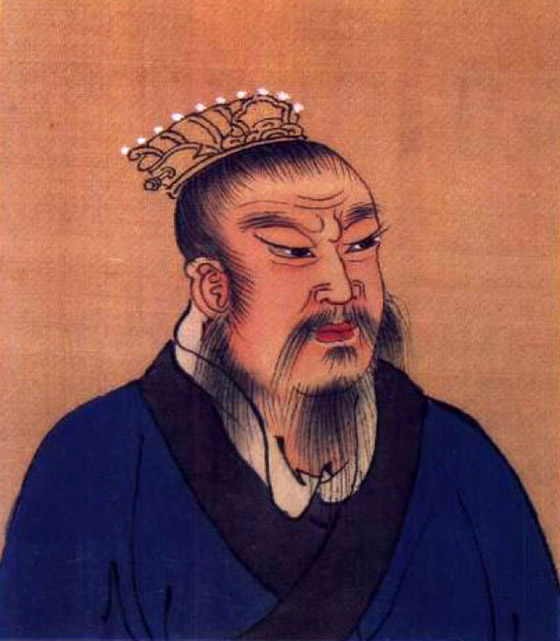
- A Ming dynasty portrait of Liu Bang

Emperor of the Han dynasty
- Reign: 28 February 202 (Note: According to Liu Bang's biography in the Book of Han, he was crowned emperor on the jiawu day of the second month of the fifth year of his reign, inclusive of his reign as King of Han. This corresponds to 28 February 202 BC in the proleptic Julian calendar.) – 1 June 195 BC
- Successor: Emperor Hui

King of Han
- Reign: c. March 206 (Note: According to Liu Bang's biography in the Book of Han, he was created King of Han in the second month of the first year of his reign, inclusive of his reign as King of Han. This corresponds to 12 March to 10 April 206 BC in the proleptic Julian calendar.) – 28 February 202 BC
- Born: 256 BC or 247 BC; Feng Town, Pei County, Chu State
- Died: 1 June 195 BC (aged 61)
- Burial: Chang Mausoleum
- Consort(s): Empress Lü; Empress Gao
- Issue: Liu Fei, King Daohui of Qi; Emperor Hui of Han; Liu Ruyi, King Yin of Zhao; Emperor Wen of Han; Princess Yuan of Lu
Names
- Family name: Liu (劉); Given name: Bang (邦); Courtesy name: Ji (季)
Posthumous name
- Emperor Gao (高皇帝)
Temple name
- Taizu (太祖)
- House: Liu
- Dynasty: Han
- Father: Liu Tuan
- Mother: Wang Hanshi

Chinese name
- Traditional Chinese: 漢高祖
- Simplified Chinese: 汉高祖
- Literal meaning: “High Ancestor of the Han”
Transcriptions
Standard Mandarin
- Hanyu Pinyin: Hàn Gāozǔ
- Wade–Giles: Han^{4} Kao^{1}-tsu^{3}
- IPA: [xân káʊ.tsù]
Wu
- Suzhounese: Hoe^{5} Kau^{1}-tsou^{3}
Yue: Cantonese
- Yale Romanization: Hon Gōu-jóu
- Jyutping: Hon3 Gou1-zou2
Southern Min
- Tâi-lô: Hàn Ko-tsóo
Old Chinese
- Baxter–Sagart (2014): *n̥ˁar-s Cə.[k]ˁaw [ts]ˁaʔ

Personal name
- Traditional Chinese: 劉邦
- Simplified Chinese: 刘邦
Transcriptions
Standard Mandarin
- Hanyu Pinyin: Liú Bāng
- Gwoyeu Romatzyh: Liou Bang
- Wade–Giles: Liu^{2} Pang^{1}
- IPA: [ljǒʊ páŋ]
Wu
- Suzhounese: Leu^{2} Paon^{1}
Yue: Cantonese
- Yale Romanization: Làuh Bōng
- Jyutping: Lau4 Bong1
- IPA: [lɐw˩ pɔŋ˥]
Southern Min
- Tâi-lô: Lâu Pang
Old Chinese
- Baxter–Sagart (2014): *mə-ru pˁroŋ

Emperor Gaozu of Han (Note: Chinese: 漢高祖; "Gaozu of Han", derived from the title of his biography in Records of the Grand Historian, is the commonly used name, even though he was accorded the temple name Taizu ("Supreme Ancestor"), not Gaozu ("High Ancestor").) (256 or 247 – 1 June 195 BC), (Note: According to Liu Bang's biography in the Book of Han, he died on the jiachen day of the fourth month of the 12th year of his reign, inclusive of his tenure as King of Han. This corresponds to 1 June 195 BC in the proleptic Julian calendar.) personal name Liu Bang, was the founder and first emperor of the Han dynasty.

Liu Bang was among the few dynastic founders to have been born in a peasant family. He initially entered the Qin dynasty bureaucracy as a minor law enforcement officer in his hometown in Pei County, within the conquered state of Chu. During the political chaos following the death of Qin Shi Huang, who had been the first emperor in Chinese history, Liu Bang renounced his civil service position and became a rebel leader, taking up arms against the Qin dynasty. He outmaneuvered rival rebel leader Xiang Yu to invade the Qin heartland and forced the surrender of the Qin ruler Ziying in 206 BC.

After the fall of the Qin dynasty, Xiang Yu, as the de facto chief of the rebels, divided the former Qin Empire into the Eighteen Kingdoms, with Liu Bang forced to accept control of the poor and remote region of Bashu (present-day Sichuan, Chongqing, and southern Shaanxi), and assuming the title "King of Han". Within the year, Liu Bang broke out with his army and conquered the Three Qins, starting the Chu–Han Contention, a civil war among various forces seeking to inherit the Qin dynasty's former territory.

In 202 BC, Liu Bang emerged victorious following the Battle of Gaixia, took control over much of the territory previously ruled by Qin, and established the Han dynasty with himself as the emperor. During his reign, Liu Bang reduced taxes and corvée labour, promoted Confucianism, and suppressed revolts by the rulers of vassal states not from his own clan, among many other actions. He also initiated the policy of heqin, a system of arranged marriages, to maintain peace between the Han Empire and the Xiongnu following the Han defeat at the Battle of Baideng in 200 BC. He died in 195 BC and was succeeded by his son Liu Ying.

== Birth and early life ==
According to the Han dynasty's imperial mythology, Liu Bang's ancestors were the mythical Emperor Yao and the Yellow Emperor. Many ancient Chinese noble families claimed descent from the Yellow Emperor to justify their right to rule.

His place of birth was Zhongyang District (中陽里), Feng Town, Pei County in the state of Chu during the later years of the Warring States period; Liu Bang's parents are only remembered as "Liu Taigong" and "Liu Ao" (劉媪; 'Old Madam Liu'). According to legend, Liu Bang was conceived after Liu Ao encountered a jiaolong during a rainstorm.

According to records, the young Liu was outspoken, charismatic, generous and forbearing, but showed little interest in education or work and frequently ran into trouble with the law; he was dependent on his brother for subsistence and his father called him a "little rascal". Later, he became good friends with Zhang Er (張耳), the magistrate of the nearby Waihuang County and former retainer of Lord Xinling of Wei. During the conquest of Wei by Qin, Liu Bang lived with Zhang Er for several months.

When Liu returned to Pei County, his close friends at the county government, Xiao He and Cao Shen, often covered up his delinquent behaviour and later helped him get an appointment as the local sheriff (亭長) of Sishui Booth (泗水亭). Liu also forged close relationships with most of the local county bureaucrats, and earned himself a small reputation in the county. While performing corvée labour in the Qin capital at Xianyang, he witnessed Qin Shi Huang undertaking an inspection tour; the royal procession impressed him.

Liu's wife, Lü Zhi, was the daughter of Lü Wen (呂文), a wealthy and influential member of the gentry recently migrated from Shanfu County. After moving to Pei County, Lü Wen held a feast for the local elite. Xiao He, who helped to collect gifts from the guests, declared that a seat inside the hall required gifts worth at least a thousand coins. Liu attended the feast without bringing any money, but loudly announced an offer of ten thousand coins before walking in, which Xiao He realised was not intended to be a serious offer. Nonetheless, Lü Wen noticed Liu and was impressed by the latter's manner, and invited Liu to sit beside him. Further impressed by Liu in conversation, Lü Wen later offered his daughter in marriage. Liu and Lü Zhi were married and had two children: Liu Ying and a daughter.

== Insurrection against the Qin dynasty ==
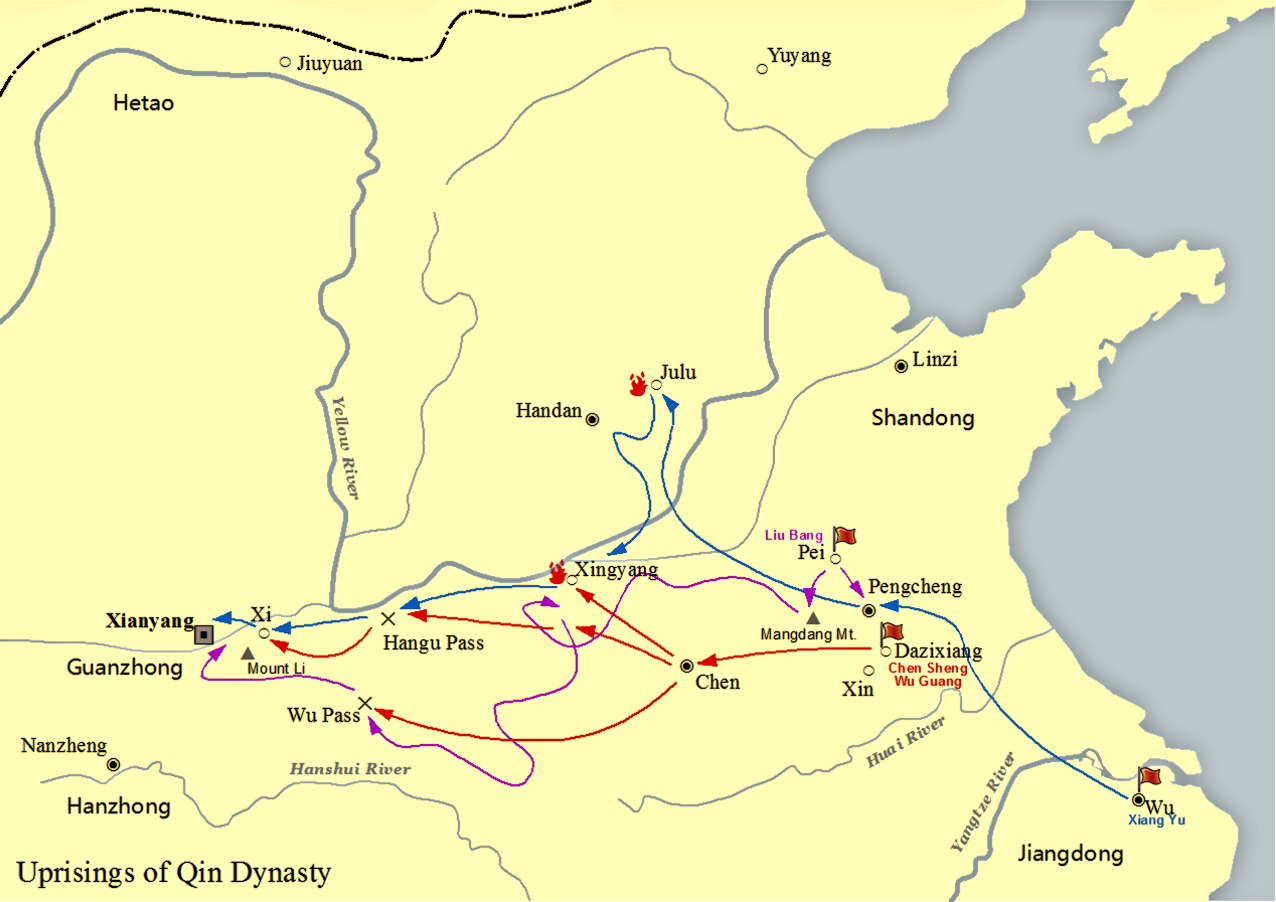
Uprisings of the Qin dynasty. Liu Bang's campaign is shown in purple.

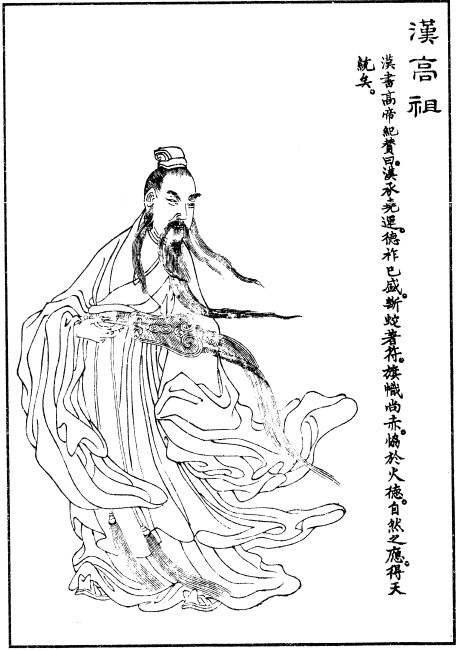
Liu Bang, in an illustration by the Qing dynasty artist Shangguan Zhou (上官周; 1665–1749)

Liu was responsible for escorting a group of penal labourers to the construction site of Qin Shi Huang's mausoleum at Mount Li. During the journey, some prisoners escaped; under Qin law, allowing prisoners to escape was punishable by death. Rather than face punishment, Liu freed the remaining prisoners, some of whom willingly acknowledged him as their leader and joined him on the run from the law. At around the same time, Qin Shi Huang, upon hearing rumours of qi of the Son of Heaven appearing in the southeast, embarked on his fifth and final tour of the country. As outlaws, Liu Bang and his men took over an abandoned stronghold on Mount Mangdang.

According to the legend known as the "Uprising of the Slaying of the White Serpent" (斬白蛇起義), Liu's ascension to rulership was prophesied after he became an outlaw. In the legend, his followers encountered a gigantic white serpent which killed some of them with its poisonous breath. That night, while he was drunk, Liu drew his sword and slew the serpent. The next morning, the outlaws encountered a crying old woman along the road. When they asked her why she was crying, she replied, "My child, the White Emperor's son, has been slain by the son of the Red Emperor." After that, she mysteriously disappeared. As this legend spread, Liu's reputation grew among his followers, who became convinced of his destiny.

In 209 BC, Chen Sheng and Wu Guang started the Dazexiang uprising to overthrow the Qin dynasty. The magistrate of Pei County considered joining the rebellion, and – acting on the advice of Xiao He and Cao Shen – invited Liu and his followers back to the county to support him; Fan Kuai, Liu's brother-in-law, delivered the message to the outlaws at Mount Mangdang. However, the magistrate later changed his mind and rescinded the offer; he also ordered Xiao and Cao to be killed lest they open the gates for Liu, but they escaped and joined Liu. On Xiao's advice, Liu wrote to his fellow commoners in Pei County, calling for them to rise up against the Qin dynasty. Copies of Liu's call to action were then delivered by arrows fired into Pei County over the city walls. The people responded to Liu's call by killing the magistrate and welcoming Liu back to Pei County. Now the leader of Pei County's population, Liu became known as the Duke of Pei (沛公).

In 208 BC, the Qin Empire faced rebellions that sought to restore the former six states conquered by the Qin during its wars of unification. In Wu County, a rebel group led by Xiang Liang installed Xiong Xin as King Huai II (楚懷王) of Chu. Liu led his followers to join that rebel group. After Xiang Liang was killed at the Battle of Dingtao, King Huai II sent Xiang Yu – Xiang Liang's nephew – and minister Song Yi to lead an army to reinforce the Zhao rebel group, which was under attack by Qin forces.

Liu Bang was made Marquis of Wu'an (武安侯) and ordered to lead an army to attack the Guanzhong region, the heartland of the Qin dynasty. King Huai II also promised to make whoever entered Guanzhong first the King of Guanzhong. In 207 BC, Liu won the race against Xiang Yu and arrived at Xianyang, the capital of the Qin dynasty. Ziying, the last Qin emperor, surrendered to Liu without resistance. Liu's occupation policies were informed by Fan Kuai (now his bodyguard) and his strategist Zhang Liang. Troops were forbidden from mistreating the population and looting. The harsh Qin laws were abolished; murder, robbery and burglary remained subject to strict punishments. Order was quickly restored in the city, and Liu won the respect of the Guanzhong population. Xiao He ordered the collection of all legal documents in the Qin palace and government facilities for preservation.

== King of Han ==
=== Feast at Swan Goose Gate ===
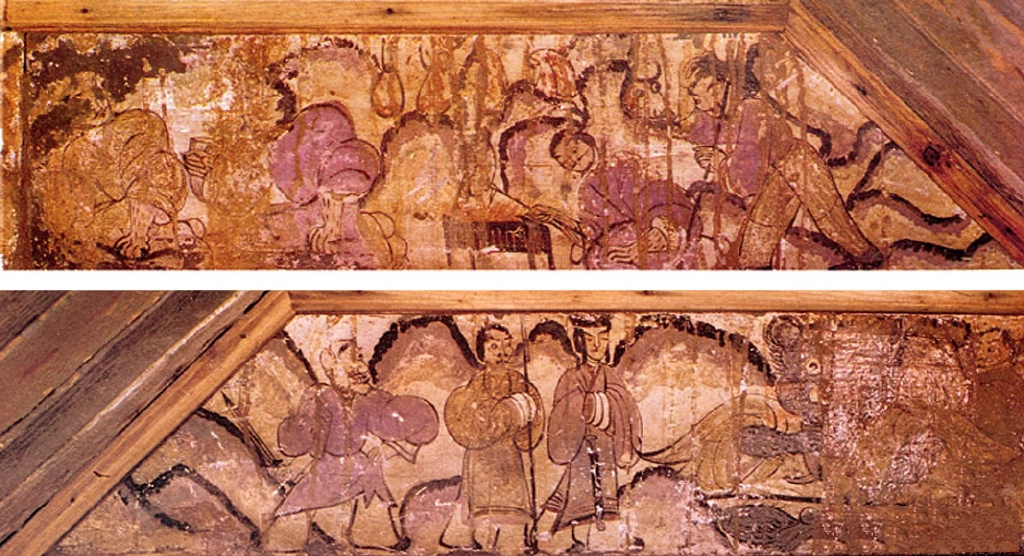
Western Han dynasty mural depicting the Hongmen Banquet, discovered in Northwest 61st Tomb now in the Luoyang Ancient Tombs Museum. event.

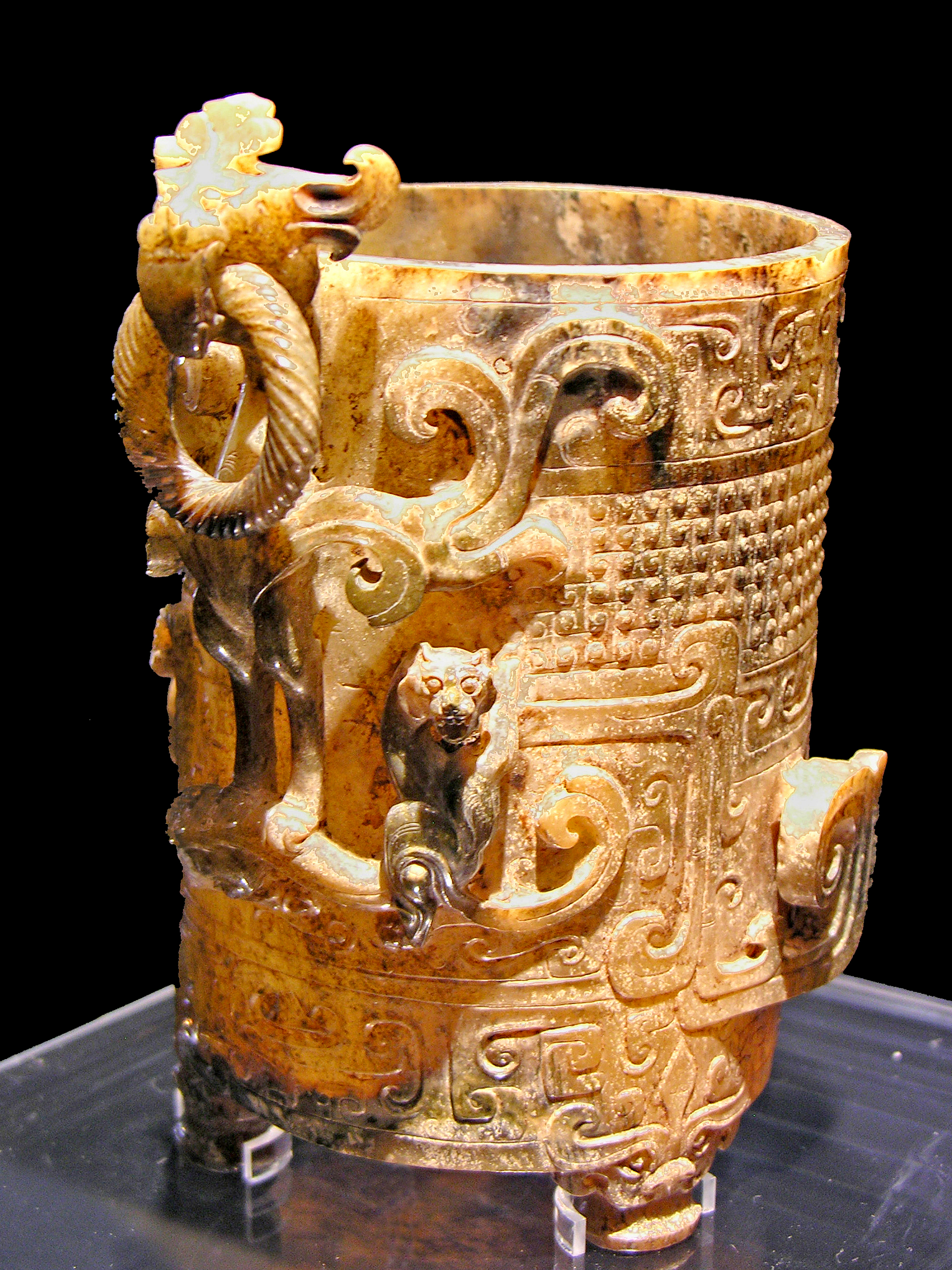
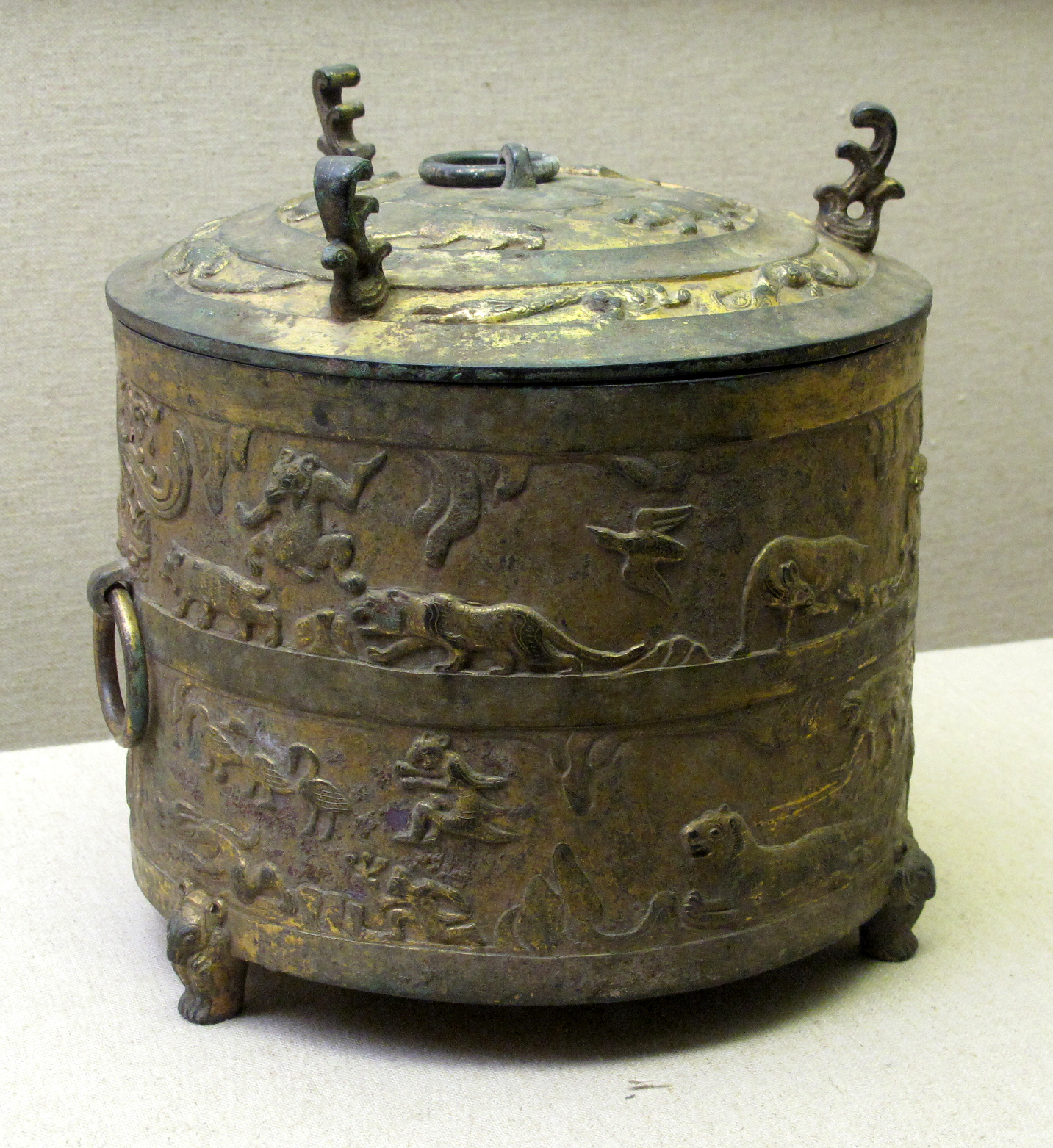
Left: A jade-carved wine cup with relief decorations, Western Han (202 BC – 9 AD)
Right: a gilded bronze wine warmer with animalistic relief decorations, 26 BC, Western Han period

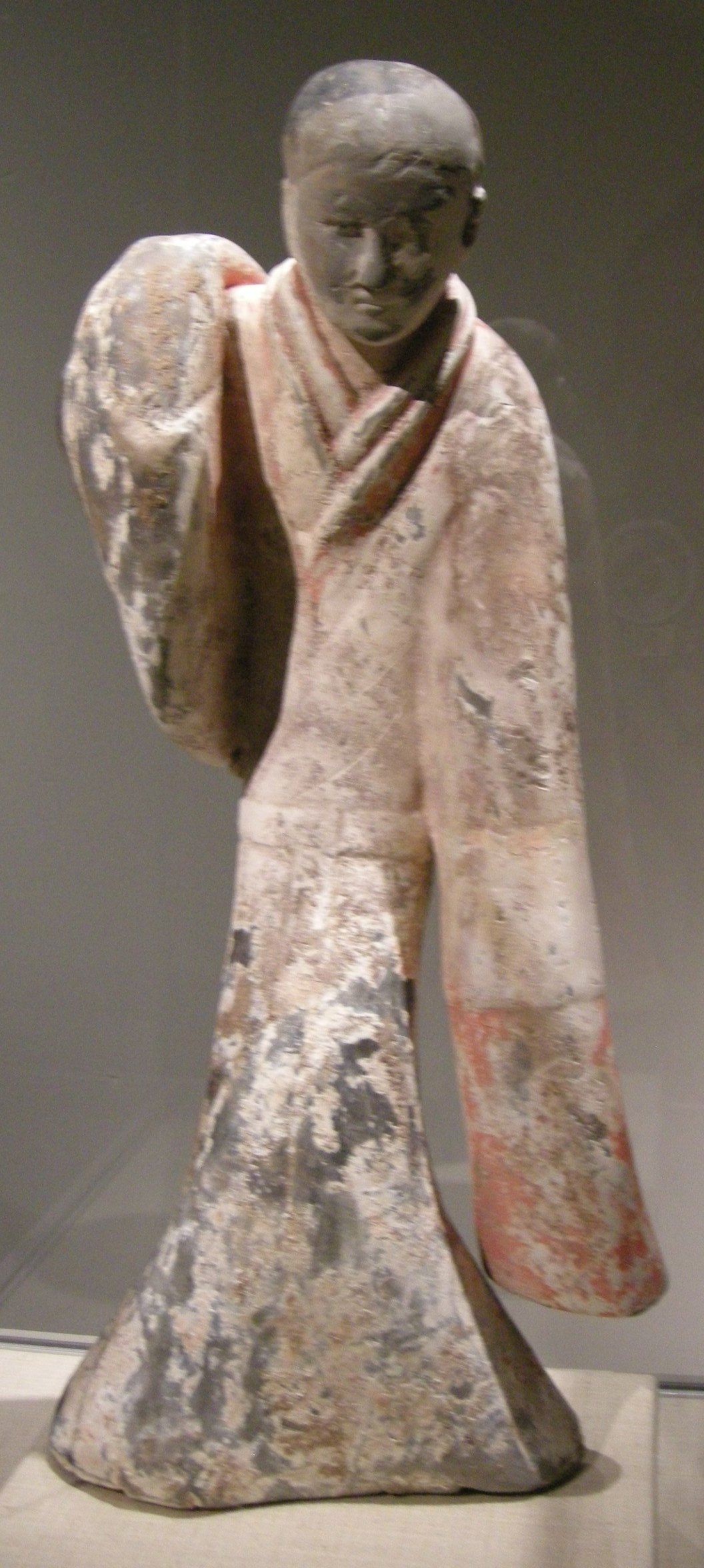
A Western Han female dancer in silk robes, 2nd century BC, Metropolitan Museum of Art; Xiang Zhuang intended to assassinate Liu Bang by pretending to perform a sword dance

Xiang Yu disliked losing the race to Guanzhong. Acting on the advice of his adviser Fan Zeng and Cao Wushang (曹無傷), an informer from Liu's camp, Xiang Yu planned to assassinate Liu under the pretext of inviting him to attend a banquet at Swan Goose Gate (鴻門; roughly present-day Hongmenbao Village, Lintong District, Xi'an, Shaanxi). However, during the banquet, Xiang Yu was persuaded by his uncle Xiang Bo, who was also a close friend of Liu's adviser Zhang Liang, not to order Liu's assassination. Frustrated by the indecision, Fan Zeng ordered Xiang Yu's cousin Xiang Zhuang to pretend to perform a sword dance and find a chance to assassinate Liu. Yet, Xiang Bo intervened by joining the dance and blocking Xiang Zhuang every time he thrust his sword towards Liu. Meanwhile, Zhang Liang slipped away and summoned Fan Kuai, who arrived at the banquet in full armour and gave a speech chastising Xiang Yu for attempting to assassinate Liu despite the achievements Liu had made in overthrowing the Qin dynasty. Embarrassed by Fan's speech, Xiang Yu ordered the sword dance to stop and rewarded Fan for his bravery. Liu Bang then found a chance to escape Xiang Yu's camp by pretending to go to the latrine, and then led his troops out of Xianyang towards the west. Shortly after that, Xiang Yu led his forces into Xianyang, sacking the former Qin capital and burning the Epang Palace.

=== Enfeoffment at Hanzhong ===
After occupying Xianyang, Xiang Yu proclaimed himself "Hegemon-King of Western Chu" and split the former Qin Empire into the Eighteen Kingdoms. Although Liu Bang should rightfully become the King of Guanzhong per King Huai II's earlier promise, Xiang Yu gave the Guanzhong region – divided into three kingdoms collectively known as the Three Qins – to three former Qin generals who had surrendered to him after the Battle of Julu. Liu Bang instead received the remote Bashu region (Sichuan Basin and upper Han River valley) as his kingdom, along with the title "King of Han" (漢王). He awarded Zhang Liang some gold and precious stones, which Zhang Liang then used to bribe Xiang Yu's uncle Xiang Bo to ask Xiang Yu to grant Liu Bang the territory of Hanzhong as well.

Liu and his men were then escorted across the Qinling Mountains by a detachment of Xiang Yu's forces into Hanzhong. Acting on Zhang Liang's advice, Liu destroyed the gallery roads leading into the Bashu region for strategic reasons: hinder future attacks from Xiang Yu, and make Xiang Yu believe that he had no intention of leaving Bashu after settling there.

== Chu-Han contention ==
From 206 to 202 BC, Liu Bang engaged Xiang Yu in a power struggle – historically known as the Chu–Han Contention – for supremacy, while simultaneously attacking and subjugating the other kingdoms.

=== Conquest of the Three Qin ===
Liu Bang's migration to Hanzhong was far from pleasant. His followers were mostly from the Wu and Chu flatland regions so they could not adapt well to the mountainous terrain in Bashu. Moreover, there were many deserters every day. Liu also grew temperamental as he was very unhappy with his own predicament. One night, upon hearing a rumour that Xiao He had abandoned him, Liu almost had a nervous breakdown. When Xiao returned the following morning, Liu confronted him and demanded an explanation. Xiao revealed that he had left in a hurry after learning that Han Xin had deserted. Among all the deserters, Xiao was convinced that Liu could not afford to lose a talent like Han Xin, so that was why he had chosen to go after Han Xin only, and bring him back. Xiao then introduced Liu to Han Xin, who laid out his strategic plan to conquer the states. Impressed and convinced, Liu formally appointed Han Xin as a general of his army.

Meanwhile, Xiang Yu's overbearing and arbitrary assignment of the Eighteen Kingdoms had caused much resentment among the former rebel leaders. Merely four months after Liu left for Bashu, a rebellion broke out in the Qi territories in late 206 BC, prompting Xiang Yu to lead his troops to suppress the revolt. On Han Xin's advice, Liu sent his men to pretend to rebuild the gallery roads while secretly dispatching Han Xin with an army to attack the Three Qins via another route through Chencang. Han Xin took Zhang Han, one of the rulers of the Three Qins, by surprise and defeated him in battle. After that, the other two rulers decided to surrender to Liu. By August or September 205 BC, the Three Qins and the Guanzhong region had come under Liu's control.

=== Defeat at Pengcheng ===
While Xiang Yu was busy suppressing the rebellion in the Qi lands, Liu gathered an army of 560,000 from the Bashu and Guanzhong regions and marched east to attack Western Chu. En route, he encountered Peng Yue, who joined his cause upon promise of a fiefdom in the Wei territories. Liu then ordered Peng Yue to lead his 30,000 men to pacify the surrounding areas, while he led his 560,000 troops into Pengcheng (彭城; present-day Xuzhou, Jiangsu), the Western Chu capital, apparently unopposed. Due to lack of military discipline, Liu's soldiers looted and pillaged Pengcheng after occupying it.

Upon learning of the fall of Pengcheng, Xiang Yu left the bulk of his forces to continue fighting in Qi, while he personally led 30,000 elite troops to retake his capital. He made camp about ten li near present-day Xiao County, Anhui, and attacked Pengcheng at dawn. By noon, Xiang Yu had routed Liu's unprepared forces, driving them towards the nearby Gu and Si rivers, where over 100,000 men drowned or were killed by Chu soldiers. The remaining Han forces fled south to higher ground but were trapped by Chu forces near the Sui River, where another 100,000 men lost their lives and their corpses even blocked the river flow.

Liu escaped Pengcheng with only a dozen horsemen and headed to Pei County to fetch his family. Xiang Yu also sent troops to Pei County to capture Liu's family, but they had all fled earlier. Xiang Yu's men coerced a local into revealing the whereabouts of Liu's family, and managed to capture Liu's parents and Liu's wife Lü Zhi. En route, Liu encountered his and Lü Zhi's children – Princess Yuan and Liu Ying – and picked them up in his carriage, which was driven by Xiahou Ying. In his desperation to escape and lighten the load, Liu attempted thrice to push his children out of the carriage and abandon them. However, each time, Xiahou Ying stopped him and saved the children.

=== Battle of Jingsuo ===
After their disastrous defeat at Pengcheng, the strength of the Han forces decreased drastically. Many of the kings who had surrendered to Liu earlier defected to Xiang Yu's side. Moreover, the states of Qi and Zhao, which were previously at war with Western Chu, also requested to make peace.

Upon reaching Xiayi (下邑; east of present-day Dangshan County, Anhui), Liu regrouped his forces and prepared for a treat. When he arrived at Yu County, he sent an envoy to meet Ying Bu, the King of Jiujiang, to seek his support. Ying Bu, who had already been holding a grudge against Xiang Yu over the latter's unfair assignment of the Eighteen Kingdoms, agreed to side with Liu. In response to Ying Bu's betrayal, Xiang Yu sent Long Ju with an army to attack Jiujiang.

In 205 BC, Liu designated his son Liu Ying as crown prince and stationed him in Yueyang. Shortly after, Liu's forces attacked and captured Feiqiu (廢丘; present-day Xingping, Shaanxi); Zhang Han, the King of Yong, committed suicide after his defeat.

In the south, Ying Bu failed to resist Long Ju's attack so he gave up on Jiujiang and went to join Liu. Liu reorganised his forces – incorporating reinforcements from the Guanzhong region – and marched east to attack Xiang Yu again at Jing and Suo counties, both around present-day Xingyang, Henan. The battle was historically known as the Battle of Jingsuo. Liu emerged victorious and drove Xiang Yu's forces eastward out of Xingyang.

=== Battle of Chenggao and Treaty of Hong Canal ===
In 204 BC, after sustaining losses from Chu attacks on his supply routes to Xingyang, Liu's forces began to run short of supplies so Liu requested to make peace with Xiang Yu, agreeing to cede the lands east of Xingyang to Xiang Yu. Initially, Xiang Yu wanted to accept Liu's offer but his adviser Fan Zeng urged him to reject it and use the opportunity to attack and destroy Liu. Xiang Yu thus changed his mind, pressed the attack on Xingyang, and besieged Liu inside the city. Liu heeded Chen Ping's suggestion to use 40,000 catties of gold to bribe some of Xiang Yu's men and get them to spread rumours that Fan Zeng had the intention of betraying Xiang Yu. Xiang Yu fell for the ruse and dismissed Fan Zeng.

Later that year, while Xiang Yu was away suppressing a rebellion in Qi territories, Liu seized the chance to attack and conquer Chenggao, defeating Xiang Yu's forces led by Cao Jiu near the Si River. Liu then advanced further east until he reached Guangwu (廣武), trapping Xiang Yu's forces under Zhongli Mo in the area.

Following Han Xin's victory against the allied forces of Chu and Qi at the Battle of Wei River in the north, the morale of the Chu forces fell and they started running short of supplies months later. Xiang Yu had no choice but to request to make peace with Liu, offering to release Liu's family members whom he had captured earlier and had been holding hostage. Both sides agreed to a ceasefire and to give the west to Han and the east to Chu, with the dividing line along the Hong Canal, which runs through present-day Zhengzhou, Xingyang and Zhongmu in Henan; this agreement was also historically known as the Treaty of Hong Canal (鴻溝和約).

=== Battle of Gaixia ===
In 203 BC, while Xiang Yu was retreating eastwards, Liu, acting on Zhang Liang and Chen Ping's advice, renounced the peace agreement and prepared to attack Xiang Yu. He also sent messengers to meet Han Xin and Peng Yue, seeking their assistance to launch a coordinated attack on Xiang Yu from three directions. However, Han Xin and Peng Yue failed to mobilise their forces, so Liu ended up being defeated by Xiang Yu at Guling (固陵; south of present-day Taikang County, Henan). After retreating and reinforcing his defences, Liu sent word to Han Xin and Peng Yue again, promising to award them fiefs and noble titles if they joined him in attacking Xiang Yu. They finally agreed this time.

Three months later in 202 BC, the combined forces of Liu, Han Xin and Peng Yue attacked Xiang Yu from three directions. Running low on supplies, Xiang Yu and his forces found themselves trapped in Gaixia (in present-day Anhui). There, Han Xin ordered his troops to sing folk songs from the Chu lands to evoke feelings of nostalgia among Xiang Yu's men – who were mostly from Chu – and create the impression that many Chu soldiers had surrendered and joined the opposing side. The morale of Xiang Yu's forces plummeted and many of his soldiers deserted. Xiang Yu attempted to fight his way out but encountered several ambushes along the way. Eventually, he was left with only 28 men when he reached the northern bank of the Wu River (烏江; near present-day He County, Anhui), where he made a last stand and managed to slay over a hundred enemy soldiers before committing suicide by slitting his throat.

== Founding of the Han dynasty ==
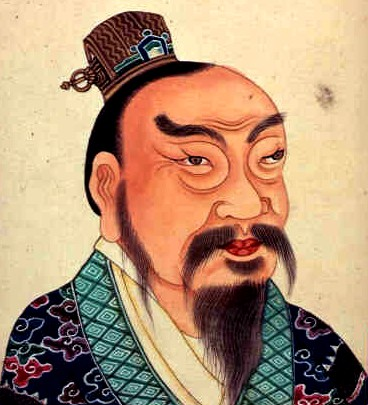
A portrait of Liu Bang from an 18th-century album of Chinese emperors' portraits

In 202 BC, Liu became emperor with the support of his subjects even though he had expressed reluctance to take the throne. The dynasty was named "Han" and had its initial capital at Luoyang. Upon convincing arguments from the soldier Lou Jing, affirmed by Liu's trusted general Zhang Liang, this was quickly changed to Chang'an in the more self-sufficient and defensible Guanzhong Region. Liu Bang also instated his wife Lü Zhi as empress and their son Liu Ying as crown prince.

The following year, Liu wanted to reward his subjects who had contributed to the founding on the Han Empire, but the process dragged on for a year as they could not agree on how to distribute the rewards. Liu felt that Xiao He had made the greatest contribution, so he made Xiao a marquis and gave him the largest amount of food stores. However, some of his other subjects expressed objections, saying that Xiao should not get the best reward since he had never fought on the frontline during the battles. Nonetheless, Liu countered by saying that Xiao should receive the highest credit as he was responsible for planning their overall strategy in the war against Xiang Yu. Liu then named Cao Shen as the one who had made the greatest contribution in battle, and proceeded to reward him and the others accordingly.

Using the rammed earth terraces of the ruined Qin palaces south of the Wei River to speed construction, Xiao He completed the Changle Palace in 200 BC and the Weiyang Palace in 198 BC. Liu moved his court to the Changle Palace and, at Lou Jing's suggestion, sped the defense of the new capital by forcibly relocating 100,000 of the descendants of the Zhou-era aristocracy to the area, providing for greater defense against the Xiongnu while removing potentially rebellious lords from their own local power bases.

== Reign ==
=== Reducing taxes and corvée ===
Emperor Gaozu disbanded his armies and allowed the soldiers to return home. He gave an order stating that the people who remained in Guanzhong were exempted from taxes and corvée for 12 years, while those who returned to their respective native territories were exempted for six years and that the central government would provide for them for a year. He also granted freedom to those who had sold themselves into slavery to avoid hunger during the wars. In 195 BC, the emperor issued two decrees: the first officialised the lowering of taxes and corvée; the second set the amount of tribute to be paid by the vassal kings to the imperial court in the 10th month of every year. The land tax on agricultural production was reduced to a rate of 1/15 of crop yield. He also privatised the coinage.

=== Emphasis on Confucianism ===
In his early life, Liu disliked reading and scorned Confucianism. After becoming emperor, he still had a disdain for Confucianism until he met the scholar Lu Jia, who wrote the Xinyu (新語), a 12-volume book espousing the benefits of governing by moral virtue as opposed to using harsh and punitive laws (as the Qin dynasty did previously). After completing each volume, Lu Jia read it to the emperor, who was deeply impressed.

Under Liu's reign, Confucianism flourished and gradually replaced Legalism, which had been prominent during the Qin dynasty, as the state ideology. Confucian scholars, including Lu Jia, were recruited to serve in the government. The emperor also reformed the legal system by relaxing some laws inherited from the Qin dynasty and reducing the severity of certain penalties. Sometime in January or February 195 BC, after suppressing Ying Bu's rebellion, Liu passed by Confucius's birthplace in Shandong, where he held a ceremony to pay tribute to the philosopher.

=== Dispute over the succession ===
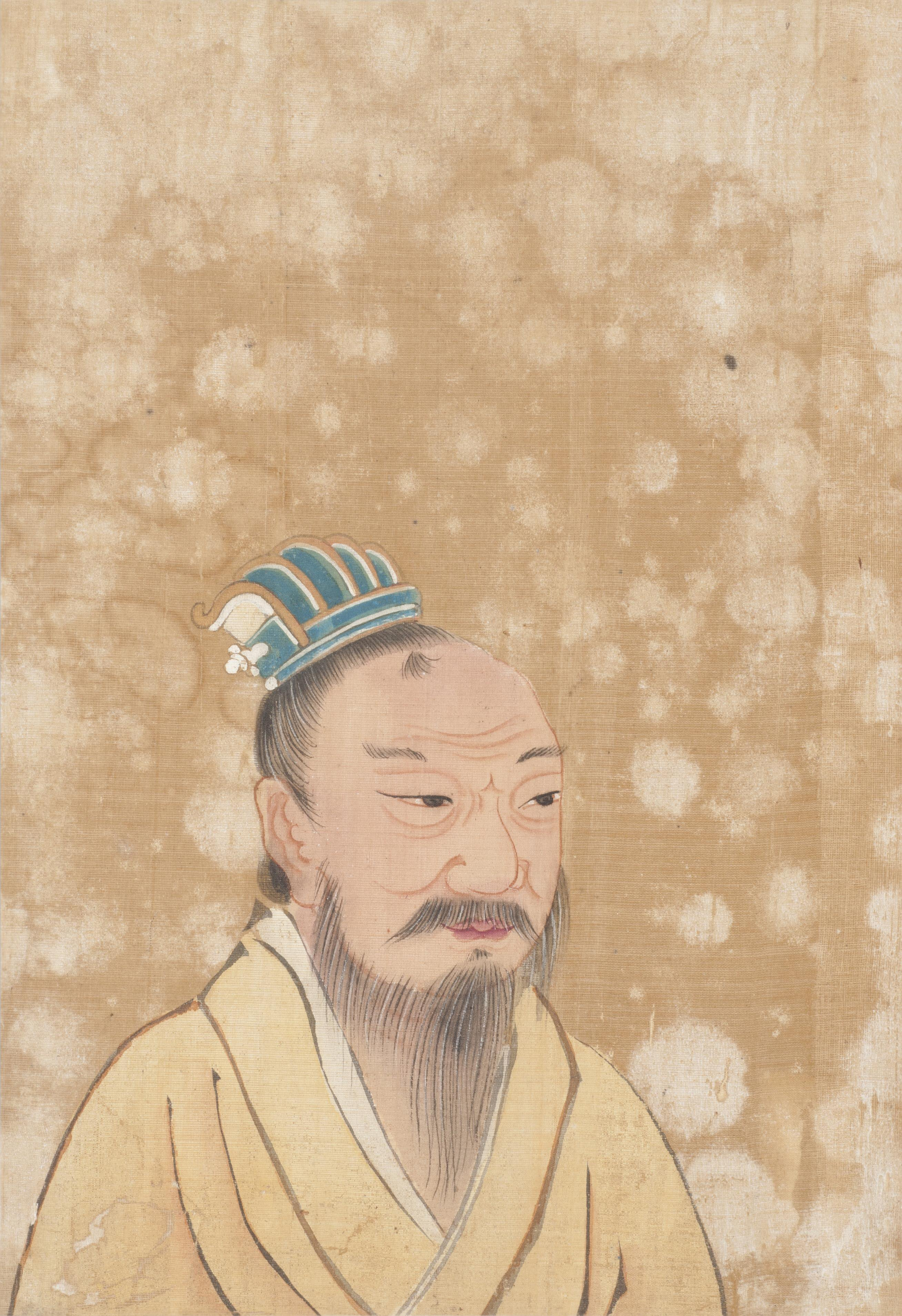
Liu Bang as depicted in the album "Portraits of Famous Men" c. 1900 housed in the Philadelphia Museum of Art

In his later years, Liu favoured Consort Qi and neglected Lü Zhi. He felt that Liu Ying, his heir apparent (born to the empress), was too weak to be a ruler, so he had the intention of replacing Liu Ying with another son, Liu Ruyi, who was born to Consort Qi. Feeling worried that her son might lose his status as crown prince, Lü Zhi sought the help of Zhang Liang, who recommended four reclusive wise men, the Four Whiteheads of Mount Shang, to speak up for Liu Ying.

In 195 BC, as Liu's health started worsening, he desired even more to replace Liu Ying with Liu Ruyi. Zhang Liang initially attempted to dissuade the emperor from doing so, but the emperor ignored him so he retired, claiming that he was ill. Shusun Tong and Zhou Chang (周昌) also strongly objected to the idea of changing the crown prince. Zhou Chang even said, "I am not good in talking, but I know this is not right. If Your Majesty deposes the Crown Prince, I won't follow your orders any more." As Zhou Chang spoke with a stutter, Liu found it rather amusing and he laughed. After that, much to Liu's surprise, the Four Whiteheads of Mount Shang showed up in his court; they had previously declined to serve in his government when he invited them to. The four men promised to help Liu Ying in the future if he were to remain as crown prince. The emperor was so pleased to see that Liu Ying had their support, so he dismissed the idea of changing his heir apparent. (Note: In his Zizhi Tongjian Kaoyi, Sima Guang was skeptical of this account. He opinioned that given Liu Bang's tenacious personality, he would not easily change his mind due to criticism from others; the main reason why Liu Bang did not make Liu Ruyi taizi was that Liu Bang feared that after his death, Ruyi would not be able to receive support from court officials. If Liu Bang really wanted to make Ruyi taizi, as someone who had been close to Liu Bang for many years, Zhang Liang was right in his observation that it would take more than a few words to change Liu Bang's mind; so, how can a few words from four old men of the woods convince Liu Bang?. If the "Four Whiteheads" could affect the succession, Liu Bang would have killed them, and not lament to Lady Qi. Also, even if the "Four Whiteheads" did convince Liu Bang to alter the succession, it would be an example of Zhang Liang providing assistance to Liu Ruyi against the latter's father, which is something Zhang would not have done. Thus, Sima did not include the account of the "Four Whiteheads" in Zizhi Tongjian, just like he did not include the account of Qin not attacking the Hangu Pass for 15 years after Su Qin had canvassed the other Six States, and the account of the Qin army retreating for 50 li after Lu Zhonglian persuaded Xinyuan Yan. Sima Guang also criticized Sima Qian for including these three accounts in his Shiji due to the latter's propensity in believing incredible accounts.)

=== Military campaigns ===
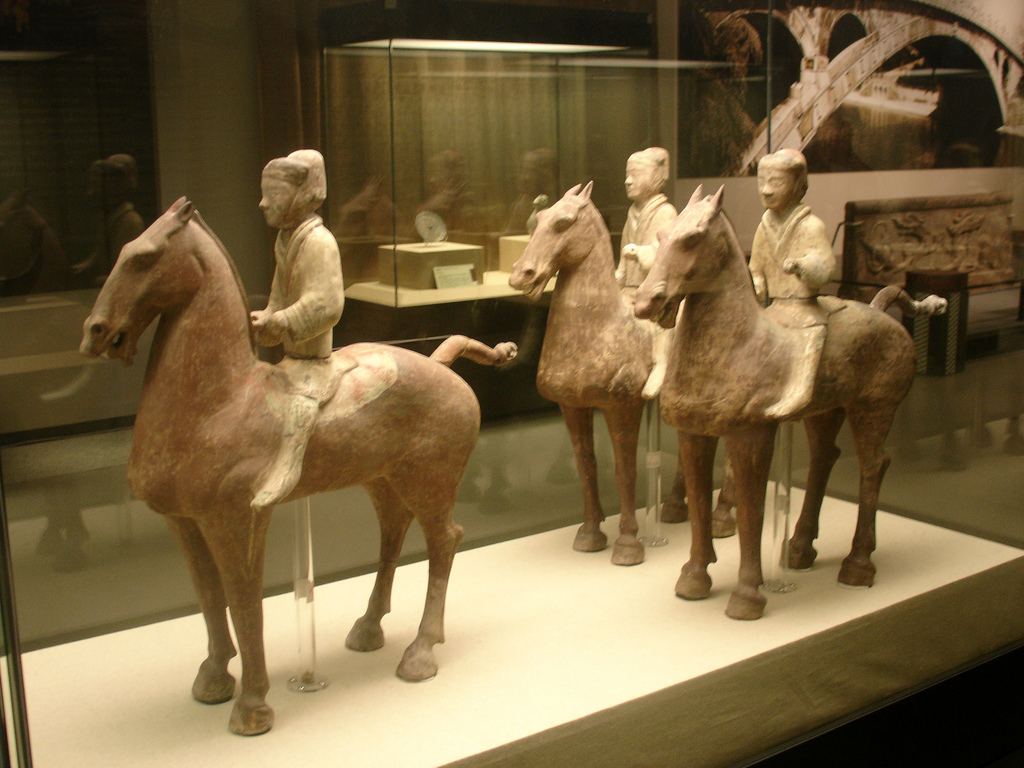
Painted ceramic statues of cavalry from the Western Han dynasty, Hainan Provincial Museum

After the Han dynasty was established, Liu enfeoffed various princes and vassal kings and awarded them each a territory in exchange for their allegiance and assistance in governing the empire. Among them were seven vassal kings who were not related to Liu's clan: Zang Tu, the King of Yan; Han Xin, the King of Hán; Han Xin, the King of Chu; Peng Yue, the King of Liang; Ying Bu, the King of Huainan; Zhang Er, the King of Zhao; Wu Rui, the King of Changsha. As time passed, Liu became increasingly distrustful of the vassal kings, feeling worried that they might turn against him since they had no blood ties with him after all. Han Xin and Peng Yue were falsely accused of treason, and arrested and executed along with their families. Ying Bu and Zang Tu started rebellions but were defeated and killed. Only Wu Rui and Zhang Er were left.

The Xiongnu to the north had posed a threat since the Qin dynasty. Qin Shi Huang had sent the general Meng Tian to oversee the defences on the Qin Empire's northern border and the construction of the Great Wall to repel the invaders. Meng Tian had achieved success in deterring the Xiongnu from advancing beyond the border. However, after the Qin dynasty collapsed, the Xiongnu seized the opportunity to move south and raid the border again. In 201 BC, one of the vassal kings, Hán Xin (King of Hán), defected to the Xiongnu leader, Modu. In the following year, Liu personally led an army to attack the Xiongnu but was besieged and trapped by the enemy during the Battle of Baideng. Acting on Chen Ping's advice, he bribed Modu's wife with gifts and got her to ask her husband to withdraw his forces. Modu did so. After returning to the capital, Liu Bang, acting on advice from Lou Jing, initiated the policy of heqin, which involved sending noble ladies to marry the Xiongnu leaders and paying annual tribute to the Xiongnu in exchange for peace between the Han Empire and the Xiongnu.

== Death ==
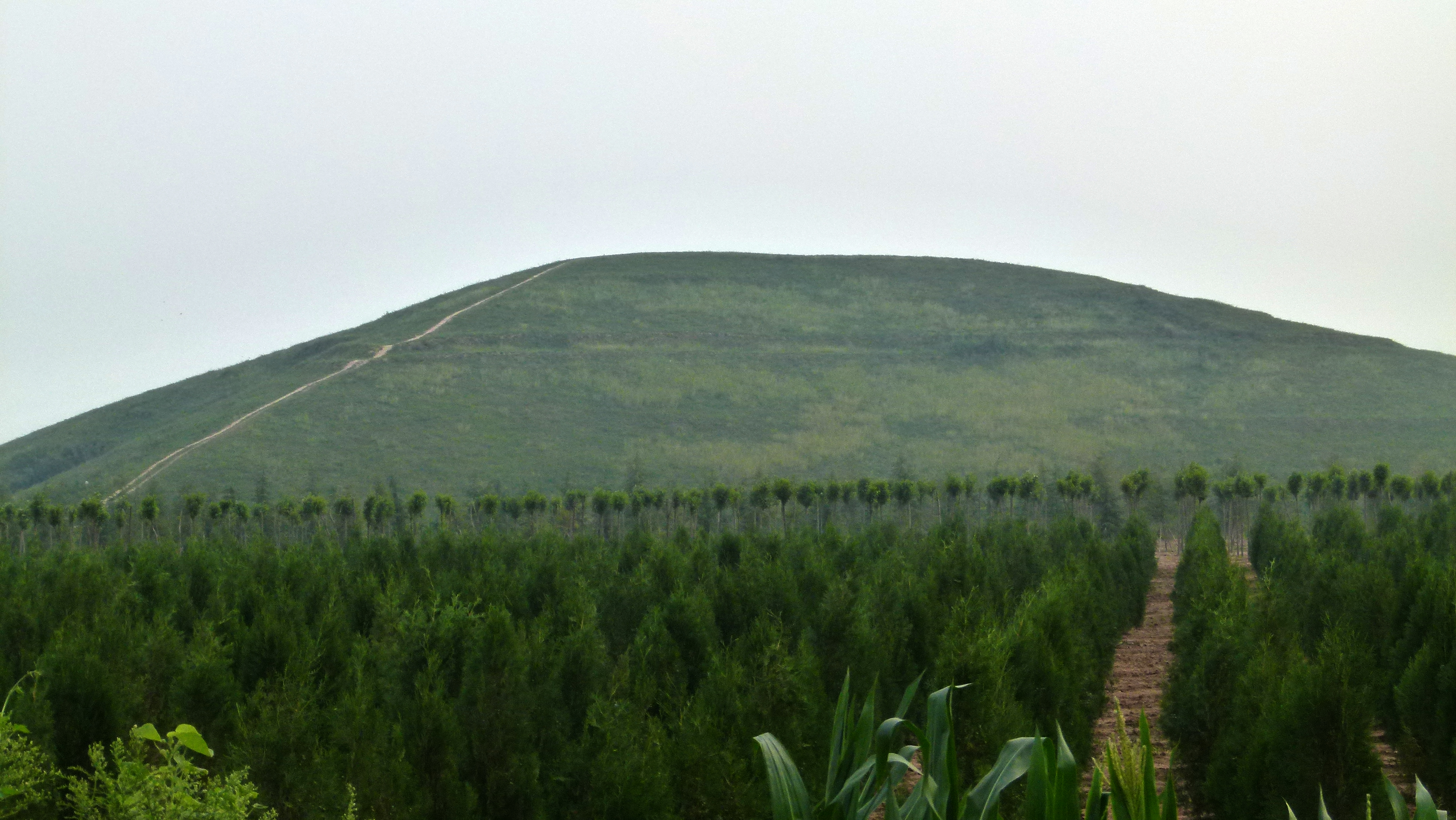
Changling, Liu Bang's tomb in Xianyang, Shaanxi

Liu was wounded in battle by a stray arrow while suppressing Ying Bu's rebellion and became seriously ill. He remained in his inner chambers for a long time and ordered his guards to deny entry to anyone who wanted to visit him. After several days, Liu's brother-in-law Fan Kuai barged in, followed closely by the emperor's other subjects. They saw the emperor lying in bed, attended to by a eunuch. Fan Kuai said, "How glorious it was when Your Majesty first led us to conquer the empire and how weary we are now. Your subjects are worried when they learn that Your Majesty is ill, but Your Majesty refuses to see us and prefers the company of a eunuch instead. Has Your Majesty forgotten about what happened with Zhao Gao?" The emperor laughed and got out of bed to meet his subjects.

Liu's health deteriorated so the empress hired a famous physician to heal him. When Liu enquired about his condition, the physician told him that his illness could be cured. However, the emperor was displeased, scolding the physician, "Isn't it Heaven's will that I managed to conquer this empire despite being of humble origin and armed with nothing but a sword? My life is determined by Heaven. It is useless even if Bian Que were here!" He refused to continue with the treatment and sent the physician away. Before his death, he said that Cao Shen could succeed Xiao He as the chancellor after Xiao died, and that Wang Ling (王陵) could succeed Cao Shen. He also said that Wang Ling might be too young to perform his duties so Chen Ping could assist Wang, but Chen was also qualified to assume the responsibilities of a chancellor all by himself. He also named Zhou Bo as a possible candidate for the role of Grand Commandant. He died in Changle Palace (長樂宮), Chang'an, on 1 June 195 BC and was succeeded by his son Liu Ying.

== Song of the Great Wind ==
The Song of the Great Wind is a song composed by Liu Bang in 195 BC when he visited his hometown in Pei County after suppressing Ying Bu's rebellion. He prepared a banquet and invited all his old friends and townsfolk to join him. After some drinks, Liu Bang played the guqin and sang the Song of the Great Wind (大風歌).

大風起兮
雲飛揚
威加海內兮
歸故鄉，
安得猛士兮
守四方！

Translation:

A great wind came forth
the clouds rose on high
Now that my might rules all within the seas,
I have returned to my old village
Where will I find brave men
to guard the four corners of my land?

== Family ==
- Empress Gao, of the Lü clan (241–180 BC), personal name Zhi
  - Princess Yuan of Lu (d. 187 BC), first daughter
    - Married Zhang Ao, Marquis of Xuanping (d. 182 BC), and had issue (one daughter, Empress Xiaohui)
  - Liu Ying, Emperor Hui (210–188 BC), second son
- Empress Gao, of the Bo clan (d. 155 BC)
  - Liu Heng, Emperor Wen (203–157 BC), fourth son
- Madame, of the Cao clan (夫人 曹氏)
  - Liu Fei, King Daohui of Qi (221–189 BC), first son
- Madame, of the Qi clan (224–194 BC)
  - Liu Ruyi, King Yin of Zhao (208–194 BC), third son
- Lady, of the Shi clan (石氏)
- Lady, of the Zhao clan (趙氏; d. 198 BC), personal name Zi'er (子兒)
  - Liu Chang, King Li of Huainan (淮南厲王 劉長; 199–174 BC), seventh son
- Unknown
  - Liu Hui, King Gong of Zhao (趙共王 劉恢; d. 181 BC), fifth son
  - Liu You, King You of Zhao (d. 181 BC), sixth son
  - Liu Jian, King Ling of Yan (燕靈王 劉建; d. 181 BC), eighth son

== See also ==
- Chu-Han contention
- Family tree of the Han dynasty
- Lü Clan Disturbance
- Weiyang Palace

== Notes ==
Emperor Gaozu of Han House of Liu Born: 256 BC Died: 1 June 195 BC
Regnal titles
New title	King of Han; 206–202 BC	Merged in the Crown
Preceded by Vacant	Emperor of China; Western Han; 202–195 BC	Succeeded by Emperor Hui of Han
