= Seven Warring States =

Leading Chinese states during Warring States period (475-221 BC)

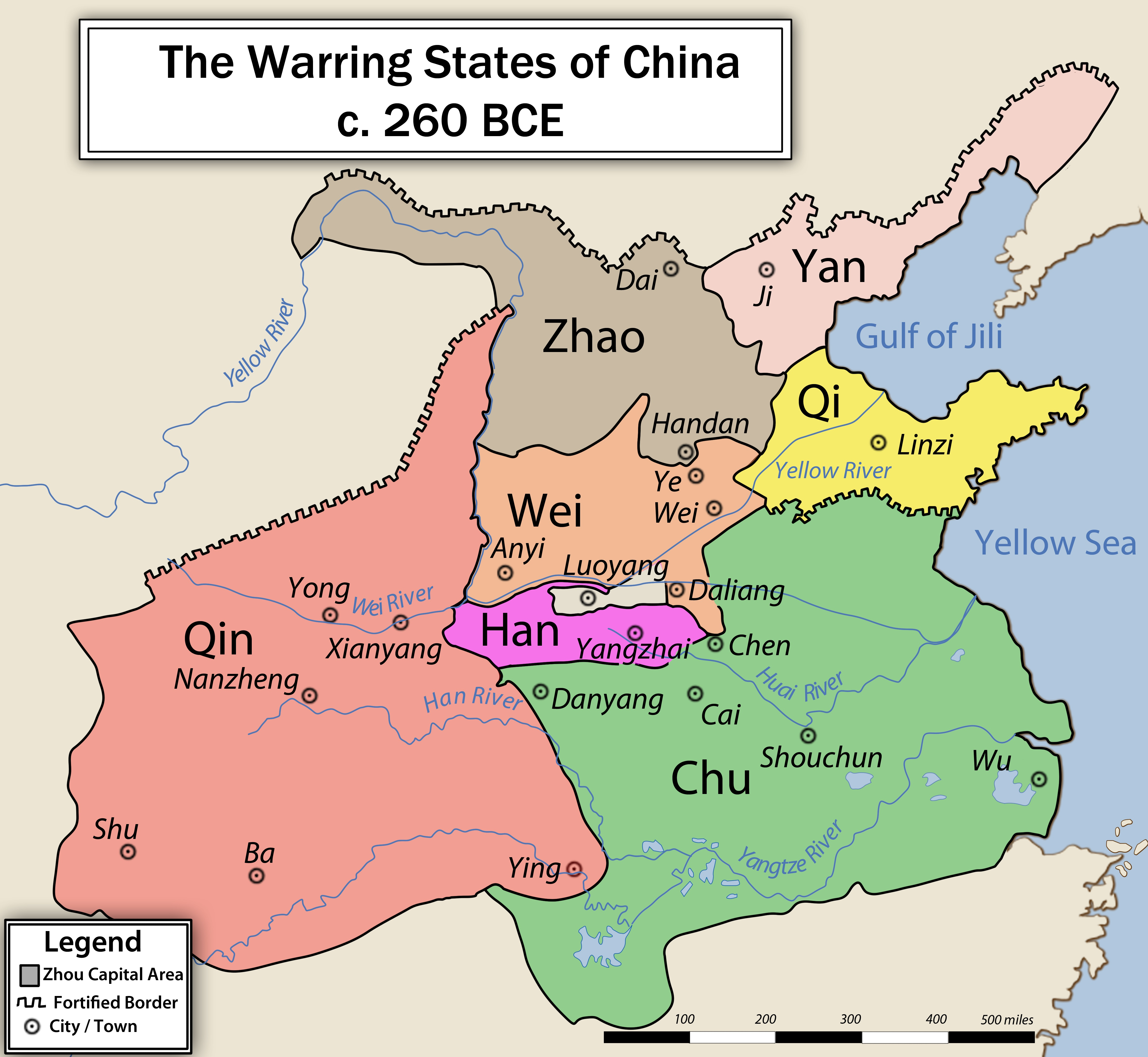
Map showing the Seven Warring States; there were other states in China at the time, but the Seven Warring States were the most powerful and significant

The Seven Warring States or Seven Kingdoms (traditional Chinese: 戰國七雄; simplified Chinese: 战国七雄; pinyin: zhàn guó qī xióng) were the seven leading hegemonic states during the Warring States period (c. 475 to 221 BCE) of ancient China:

- Han (Note: Frequently rendered Hann, to clearly distinguish it from China's later Han dynasty.) (韓/韩), defeated by Qin in 230 BCE
- Zhao (趙/赵), defeated by Qin in 228 BCE
- Wei (魏), defeated by Qin in 225 BCE
- Chu (楚), defeated by Qin in 223 BCE
- Yan (燕), defeated by Qin in 222 BCE
- Qi (齊/齐), defeated by Qin in 221 BCE
- Qin (秦)

During the Eastern Zhou dynasty, the weakened Zhou central sovereignty quickly lost control of its confederate vassal states, and the numerous autonomous states began overreaching and expanding their political ambitions via diplomacy and warfare, sparking a period of chaotic conflicts known as the Spring and Autumn period. After most of the smaller, weaker states were conquered and annexed by larger states, the geopolitical landscape eventually became dominated by seven most powerful states, and wars became increasingly pitched and violent. Over the Warring States period, many of the seven states underwent bureaucratic and military reforms in order to mobilise resources on a greater scale. This led to an intensification of warfare over the period, but also led to significant economic and cultural developments.

Of the Seven Warring States, the state of Qin grew to be the strongest and eventually conquered and successfully annexed the other six states; Han was the first to fall in 230 BCE, while Qi was the last to surrender in 221 BCE. Ying Zheng, the king of Qin, created the new title of Huangdi and became China's first emperor, Qin Shi Huang. The Qin state then became the Qin dynasty, and China entered its Imperial era, which lasted over the next two millennia.

== Formation ==
The formation of the Seven Warring States was the culmination of trends during the preceding Spring and Autumn period, when the patchwork of states created by the Western Zhou dynasty were conquered and absorbed through warfare, coalescing into seven larger polities. Qin, Qi, Chu and Yan already existed as states during that period; Qin and Yan, owing to their remote locations, were traditionally considered second-tier powers, while Chu and Qi were among the dominant states of the period, in direct competition with the state of Jin. In 403 BCE, King Weilie of Zhou recognized Jin's partition, leading to the creation of three new states: Wei, Zhao and Han. Other major states included Wu and Yue, with the latter conquering the former in 473 BCE.

Minor Chinese and sinicized states and polities continued to exist well into the Warring States era, such as Shu (annexed by Qin in 316 BCE), Zhongshan (annexed by Zhao in 296 BCE), Song (annexed by Qi in 286 BCE), and Lu (annexed by Chu in 256 or 249 BCE).

These political changes led to changes amongst the ruling families as well: in 481 BCE, the Tian clan usurped the state of Qi in a coup and replaced the ruling Jiang clan. Meanwhile, the state of Jin, which had been controlled by different noble clans for decades, was partitioned between the Han, Zhao and Wei clans in 403 BCE.

== See also ==
- Five Hegemons (Spring and Autumn period)
