= Qin Shi Huang's imperial tours =

Trips taken by China's first emperor

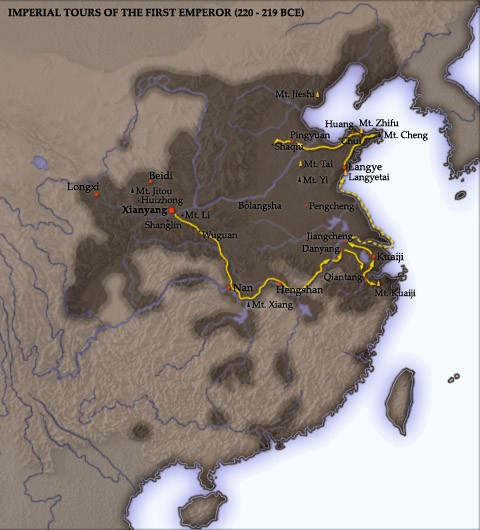
The itinerary of Qin Shi Huang's second inspection trip in 219 BC.

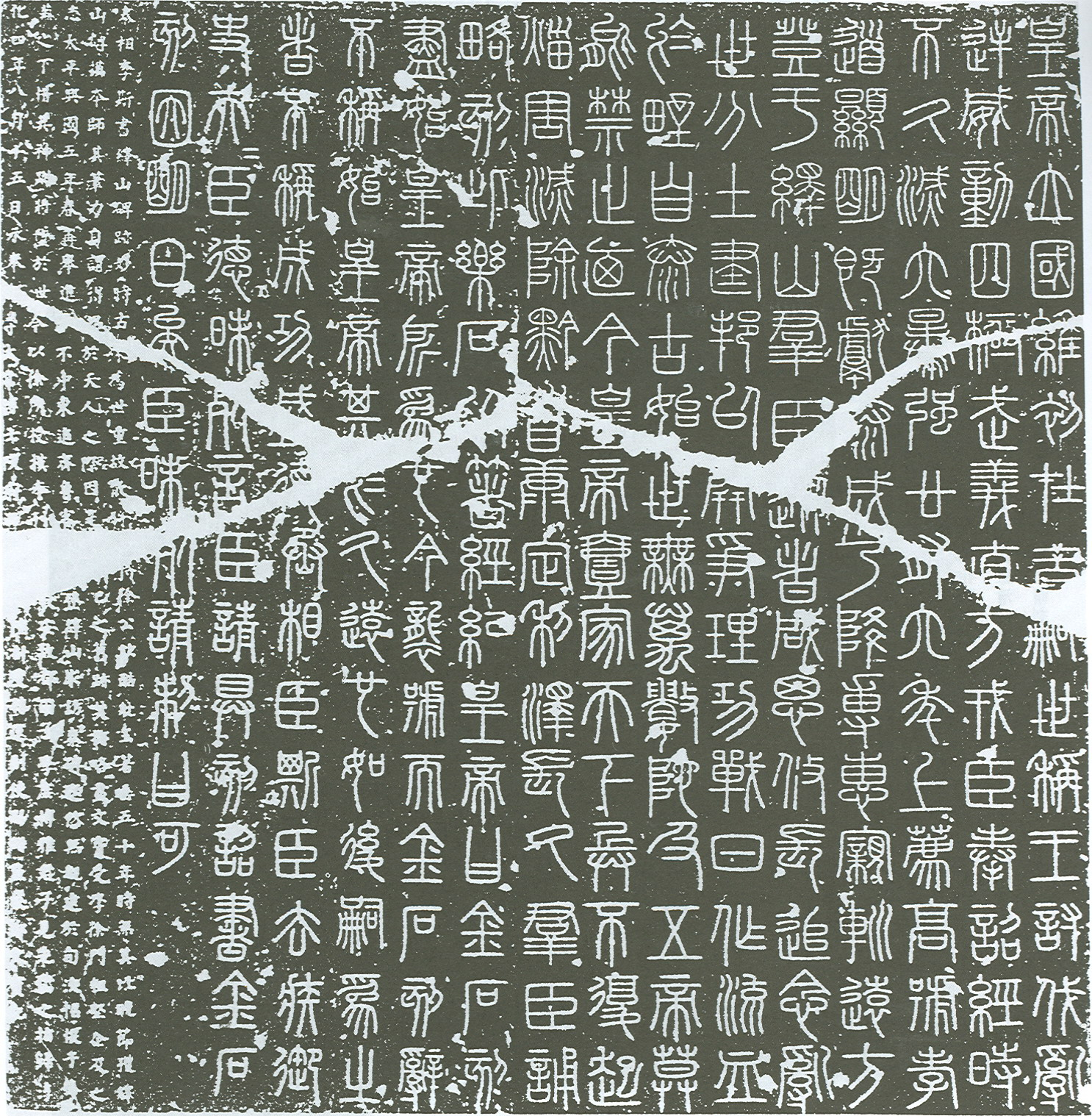
A 993 copy of the stele erected by Qin Shi Huang in 219 BC. on Mount Yi

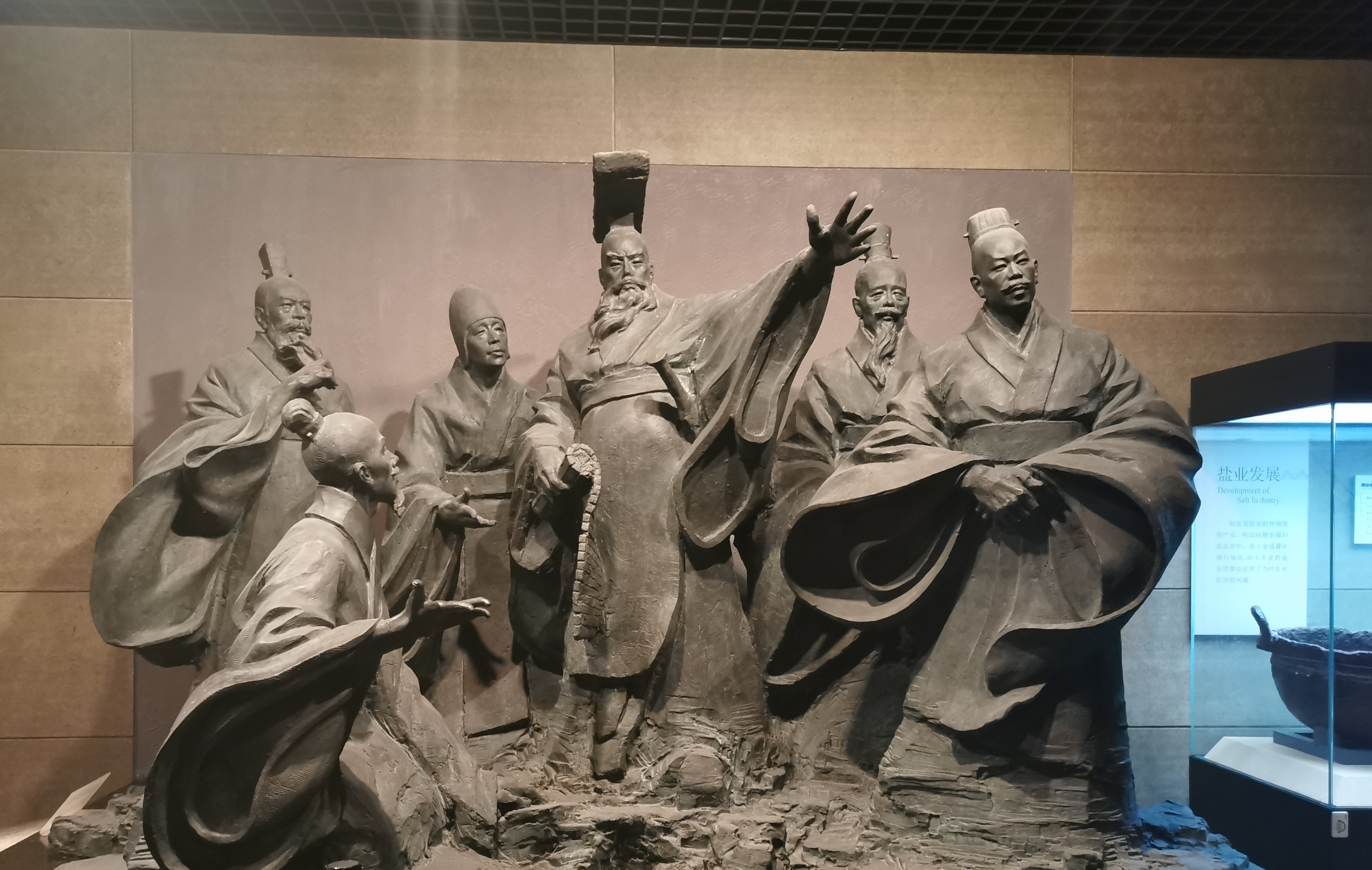
Sculpture of Qin Shi Huang during his imperial tour.

Qin Shi Huang's imperial tours (Chinese: 秦始皇東巡) refer to the trips that China's first emperor Qin Shi Huang undertook between the years 220 BC and 210 BC. In total, Qin Shi Huang made five inspection trips, and he died on the last one. During the travels, the emperor climbed sacred mountains, performed sacrifices, and erected a total of seven stelas with texts about the new regime and his own exploits. None of the stones have been found, but the texts that are supposed to be engraved on them are preserved because these were also written down by Sima Qian in the historical chronicle Shiji.

== The journeys ==
=== First trip ===
Qin Shi Huang made his first inspection trip in 220 BC westward into eastern Gansu where he visited Longxi (by Mount Liupan), Beidi (by the Jing River) and Jitou Mountain (鷄頭山). The entire journey took place within Qin's former territory.

=== Second trip ===
Year 219 BC the emperor traveled east through the previously conquered states to the Bohai Sea. On the way, he erected three steles, one at Mount Yi, one at Mount Tai, and one at Mount Langya in Shandong. He also performed sacrifices at the mountains. On his way back, he traveled south, and by the Si River he searched (unsuccessfully) for the Nine Tripod Cauldrons of the kings of the Zhou dynasty. He continued southwest, crossing the Hui River and sailing back east on the Yangtze River, then on home to the capital Xianyang (near present-day Xi'an).

When the emperor ascended the throne, he issued edicts and clarified the laws. The nation adapted to these. In his twenty-sixth year of reign he united all things under heaven. There was no one who did not visit him to show his submission. [...]

— Introduction to the inscription on the stele at Mount Tai erected in 219 BC.,

=== Third trip ===
The third inspection journey went east in the spring of 218 BC. At Bolangsha (博狼沙) in Henan, Qin Shi Huang was the victim of a failed assassination attempt by a former Han loyalist, Zhang Liang. The emperor continued east and visited Mount Zhifu in Shandong (which he had also visited the year before) where he now erected two stelae. He also revisited Mount Langya after which he returned via Shangdang (上黨) (in Shanxi) to the capital.

=== Fourth trip ===
The fourth inspection trip was made in 215 BC to the north-eastern part of the country. At the fortified palace of Jiangnüshi (姜女石) (on the Bohai Coast just north of the Shanhai Pass), the emperor erected a stele at the city gate. He toured the northeastern borderlands and also visited Jicheng (present-day Beijing) before returning to the capital Xianyang.

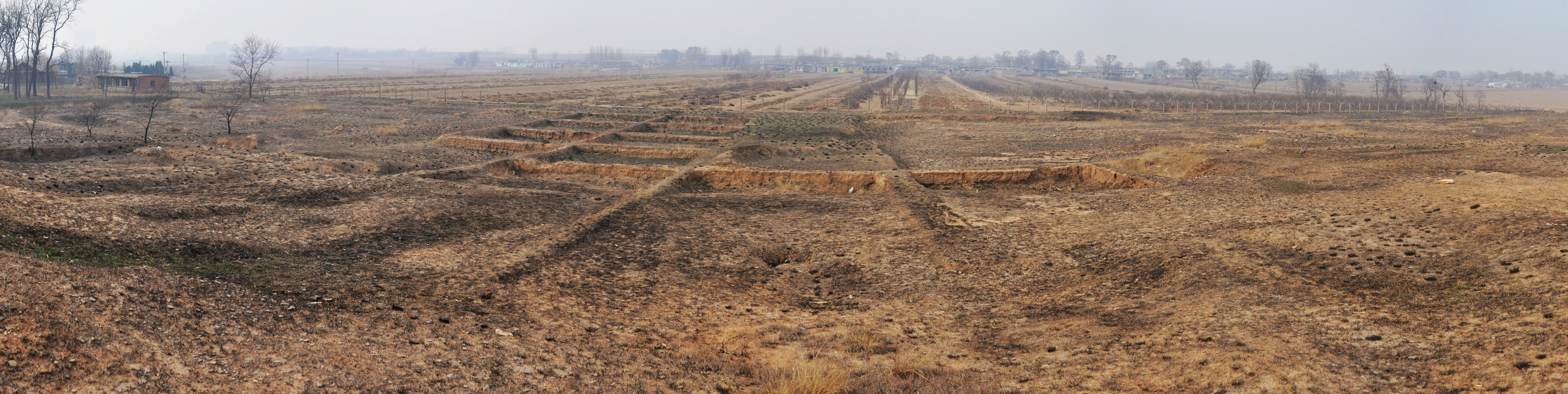
The ruins of Jiangnüshi (姜女石) at Shanhai Pass where Qin Shi Huang erected a stele in 215 BC.

=== Fifth trip ===
At the end of 211 BC Qin Shi Huang set out on his fifth and final inspection trip. Along for the trip were (among many others) chancellor Li Si, the eunuch Zhao Gao, and the emperor's younger son Ying Huhai. Qin Shi Huang began the journey by making a sacrifice to the mythological Emperor Shun (who was one of the Three Sovereigns and Five Emperors) at Yunmeng (雲夢) near Anlu in Hubei). They traveled further east on the Yangtze River to Kuaiji Mountains (會稽山) (at Shaoxing in Zhejiang) where the ancient Yu the Great is buried. The emperor climbed the mountain and erected a stele.

They continued north to Mount Langya. There they met the magician Xu Shi, who for many years had unsuccessfully searched the seas for the elixir of immortality for the emperor, and he blamed his failures on large sharks. The emperor's entourage then headed north by boat around the Shandong Peninsula. At Mount Zhifu they managed to kill a large fish after which they continued west. The emperor fell ill during the journey home and died in 210 BC in Hebei. The emperor's death was kept secret, and a conspiracy between Zhao Gao, Li Si, and Ying Huhai changed the succession, making Ying Huhai Emperor Qin Er Shi when they returned to the capital.
