= Wu Guang =

- Traditional Chinese: 吳廣
- Simplified Chinese: 吴广
Transcriptions
Standard Mandarin
- Hanyu Pinyin: Wú Guǎng
- Wade–Giles: Wu Kuang
Yue: Cantonese
- Jyutping: Ng4 Gwong2

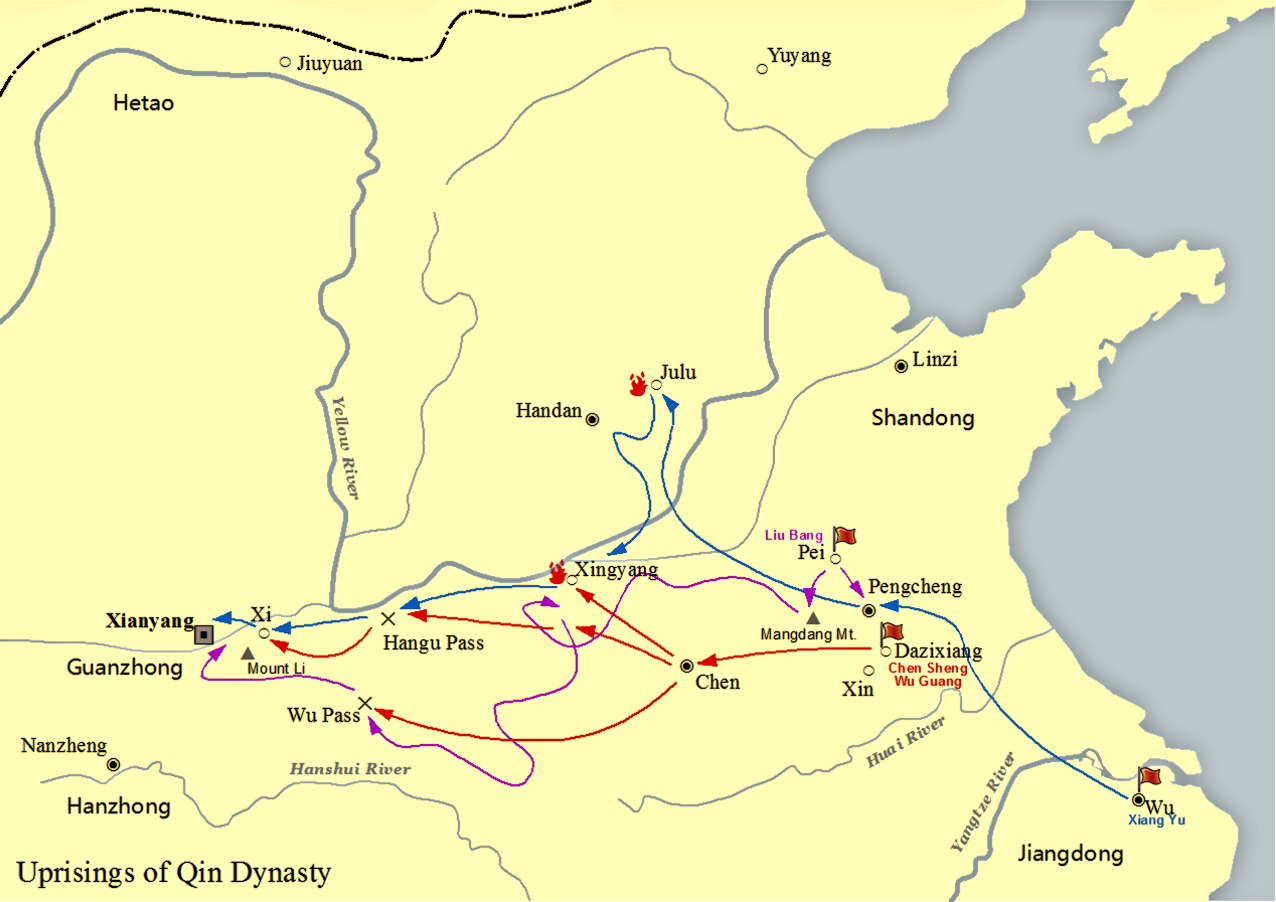
Uprisings of Qin dynasty, including Chen Sheng and Wu Guang's Dazexiang Uprising.

Wu Guang (simplified Chinese: 吴广; traditional Chinese: 吳廣, died December 209 BC or January 208 BC (Note: According to Records of the Grand Historian, Wu Guang died shortly before Chen Sheng; Chen Sheng died in the 12th month of the 1st year of the reign of Qin Er Shi. This corresponds to 4 Jan to 1 Feb 208 BC in the proleptic Julian calendar. Thus, Wu Guang's death date should be in Dec 209 BC or Jan 208 BC.)) was a leader of the first rebellion against the Qin dynasty during the reign of the Second Qin Emperor.

== Life ==
Wu Guang was born in Yangxia (陽夏; present-day Taikang County, Zhoukou, Henan), and his courtesy name was Shu. In August or September 209 BC, (Note: Records of the Grand Historian dated the incident to the 7th month of the 1st year of the reign of Qin Er Shi. This corresponds to 9 Aug to 7 Sep 209 BC in the proleptic Julian calendar.) he was a military captain along with Chen Sheng when the two of them were ordered to lead 900 soldiers to Yuyang (漁陽; southwest of present-day Miyun County, Beijing) to help defend the northern border against Xiongnu. Due to storms, it became clear that they could not get to Yuyang by the deadline, and according to law, if soldiers could not get to their posts on time, they would be executed. Chen Sheng and Wu Guang, believing that they were doomed, led their soldiers to start a rebellion. They announced that Fusu, the crown prince of Qin, who had wrongly been forced to commit suicide, and Xiang Yan (項燕), a general of Chu, had not died and were joining their cause. They also declared the reestablishment of Chu.

Using 900 men to resist an empire seemed to be a suicidal move, but the people, who had felt deeply oppressed by the Qin regime, joined Chen Sheng and Wu Guang's cause quickly. Soon, there were people asking Chen Sheng to declare himself "King of Chu". Against the advice of Zhang Er and Chen Yu, Chen Sheng declared himself "King of Rising Chu" (張楚王).

After Chen Sheng set up his capital at Chen County (陳縣; in present-day Huaiyang, Henan), he appointed Wu Guang as acting-'King of Chu' and ordered Wu to head west toward Qin proper. Wu Guang's forces, however, became bogged down while laying siege to Xingyang (滎陽; northeast of present-day Xingyang, Henan). Wu Guang's generals became concerned that Qin reinforcements under Zhang Han would soon arrive and attack them on two sides. They wanted to change Wu Guang's plans, end the siege of Xingyang, and face Zhang Han's forces directly. Unconvinced that Wu Guang would change his plans, they assassinated Wu and took over the army.

== Legacy ==
Wu Guang sometimes appears as a door god in Chinese and Taoist temples, usually partnered with Chen Sheng.

== See also ==
- Dazexiang Uprising
