= Fusu =

Chinese heir apparent of Qin Shi Huang

- Traditional Chinese: 扶蘇
- Simplified Chinese: 扶苏
Transcriptions
Standard Mandarin
- Hanyu Pinyin: Fúsū

Fusu (died c. August or September 210 BC) was an ancient Chinese prince during the Qin dynasty. He was the eldest son and heir apparent of Qin Shi Huang, the First Emperor of China, until his forced suicide due to a usurping conspiracy by his younger brother Huhai, chief eunuch Zhao Gao and chancellor Li Si.

== Life ==
After being deceived by two alchemists while seeking prolonged life, Qin Shi Huang supposedly ordered more than 460 scholars in the capital to be buried alive, though an account given by Wei Hong in the 2nd century added another 700 to the figure. Fusu objected to the mass executions and counselled that, with the country newly unified and enemies still not pacified, such a harsh measure imposed on those who respect Confucius would cause social instability. However, he was unable to change Qin Shi Huang's mind and, as a de facto exile for defying his royal father, was instead sent to the northern frontier at New Qinzhong (新秦中) in 212 BC to serve as an army supervisor under Meng Tian, who was commanding a 300,000-strong border garrison after defeating the Xiongnu nomads in the Ordos Basin in 215 BC.

Qin Shi Huang died from sudden illness during his fifth imperial tour in Autumn 210 BC. Before his unexpected death, Qin Shi Huang issued a final edict on his deathbed to recall Fu Su back from the frontier and have him take care of the state funeral. However, chief eunuch Zhao Gao, who was in charge of safekeeping and announcing the edict, was a bitter enemy of Meng Tian's brother Meng Yi and thus afraid that the ascension of Fu Su would lead to his own political downfall. Zhao Gao convinced Fusu's youngest brother, Prince Huhai, to falsify another edict and claim the throne, and also managed to persuade chancellor Li Si, who had been feeling threatened politically by the rise of Meng Yi as a more brilliant bureaucrat in the Qin court, to partake in the scheme. The three conspirators then suppressed all information regarding Qin Shi Huang's death and rushed the imperial convoy back to the capital Xianyang, using an imposter to impersonate the dead emperor in the carriage and masking the death smell with a nearby wagon carrying salted fish. Once arrived back in the capital, Zhao Gao forged a fake decree naming Huhai as Qin Shi Huang's successor, and sent a sealed decree to the northern garrison ordering Fusu to commit suicide.

Upon receiving the decree, some associates of Fusu, including General Meng Tian, questioned the veracity of the decree, but Fusu, who either did not believe someone would dare to forge the decree or, with good reason, feared being killed anyway, decided to obey the decree and committed suicide by slitting his own throat with a sword. Zhao Gao's henchmen then had both Meng brothers arrested and executed, and Huhai (now Emperor Qin Er Shi) violently purged all his remaining siblings to eradicate any potential challengers to his throne.

== Legacy ==
Just a year after Fusu's death, a large-scale peasant rebellion broke out in Dazexiang (modern Yongqiao, Anhui) against Qin Er Shi's tyranny. The rebel leaders Chen Sheng and Wu Guang decided to take up Fusu's name to denounce the legitimacy of Qin Er Shi's rule and justify their uprising in 209 BC.

According to Records of the Grand Historian, Fusu had a son named Ziying, who was enthroned after Zhao Gao forced Qin Er Shi to commit suicide in 207 BC. Ziying soon conspired with his own sons and assassinated Zhao Gao, before surrendering the Qin dynasty to rebel leader Liu Bang. There is no firm consensus on what exactly was Ziying's relationship to the Qin royal family. Some scholars (such as Wang Liqun) pointed out that if Fusu had any son, the son would likely be too young to plot the demise of Zhao Gao with his own two sons, as Ziying's sons must be at least young adults to partake in such a plot. Qin Shi Huang only lived to be 49; Fusu might have only lived into his 30s and would not have any grandsons that could participate in political struggles. A more favored hypothesis is that Ziying is instead an uncle or cousin of Fusu and Huhai, which is why he survived the political purge of Huhai's siblings, and scholars such as Li Kaiyuan and Ma Feibai believed Ziying is a pardoned son of Qin Shi Huang's treasonous brother Chengjiao.

Fusu's tragic fate as a decent, regal man falling victim to a devious scheme, for which many later historians hold sympathy and pity, was the main reason that Han dynasty crown prince Liu Ju, the eldest son and heir apparent of Emperor Wu, decided to rise up in arms against his father's regular armies in 91 BC in attempt to purge conspirators trying to frame him for witchcraft, after his teacher reminded him of what had happened to Fusu.

Fusu sometimes appears as a door god in Chinese and Taoist temples, usually paired with Meng Tian.

Fusu House of Ying Died: 210 BC
Honorary titles
Preceded by None	Crown Prince of China	Vacant Title next held by Liu Ying
