= Chen Sheng =

Qin Dynasty rebel

- Traditional Chinese: 陳勝
- Simplified Chinese: 陈胜
Transcriptions
Standard Mandarin
- Hanyu Pinyin: Chén Shèng
- Wade–Giles: Ch'en Sheng
Yue: Cantonese
- Jyutping: Can4 Sing3
Old Chinese
- Zhengzhang: *l'iŋ hljɯŋ

Chen She
- Traditional Chinese: 陳涉
- Simplified Chinese: 陈涉
Transcriptions
Standard Mandarin
- Hanyu Pinyin: Chén Shè
- Wade–Giles: Ch'en She
Yue: Cantonese
- Jyutping: Can4 Sip3
Old Chinese
- Zhengzhang: *l'iŋ djeb

Chen Sheng (died c.January 208 BC), also known as Chen She ("She" being his courtesy name), posthumously known as King Yin, was the leader of the Dazexiang Uprising, the first rebellion against the Qin dynasty. It occurred during the reign of the Second Qin Emperor.

== Life ==
Chen Sheng was born in Yangcheng (陽城; in present-day Fangcheng County, Henan). In August or September 209 BC, he was a military captain along with Wu Guang when the two of them were ordered to lead 900 soldiers to Yuyang (漁陽; southwest of present-day Miyun County, Beijing) to help defend the northern border against Xiongnu. Due to storms, it became clear that they could not get to Yuyang by the deadline, and according to law, if soldiers could not get to their posts on time, they would be executed. Chen Sheng and Wu Guang, believing that they were doomed, led their soldiers to start a rebellion. They announced that Qin crown prince Fusu, who had wrongly been forced to commit suicide, and Chu general Xiang Yan, who had killed himself after his defeat during the Qin conquest of Chu, had actually survived and were joining their cause. They also declared the reestablishment of Chu.

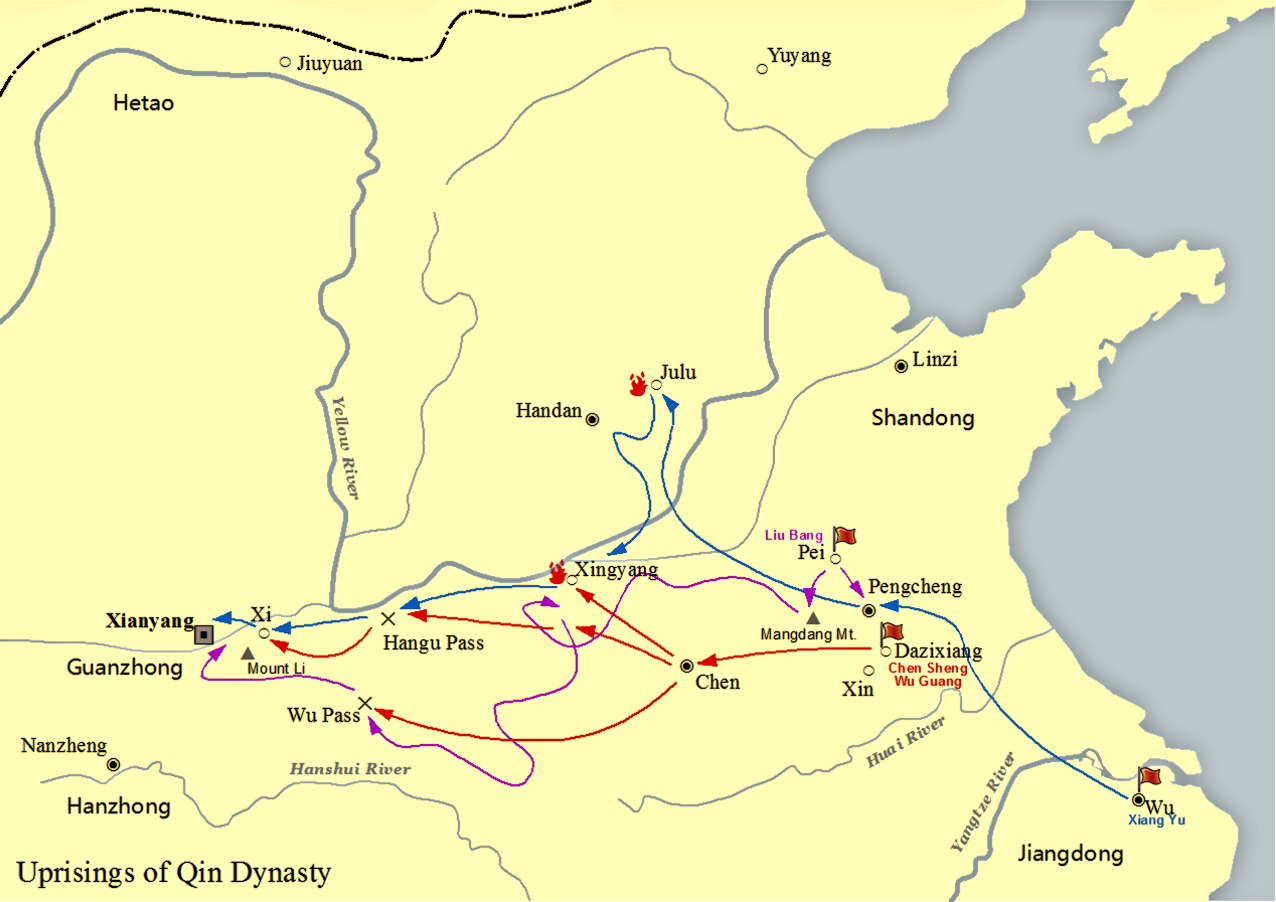
Uprisings of Qin dynasty, locations of Dazexiang and Yuyang are shown.

Using 900 men to resist an empire seemed to be a suicidal move, but the people, who had felt deeply oppressed by the Qin regime, joined Chen Sheng and Wu Guang's cause quickly. More than 20,000 men joined. Soon, there were people asking Chen Sheng to declare himself "King of Chu". Acting against the advice of his advisors Zhang Er and Chen Yu, Chen Sheng declared himself "King of Rising Chu" (張楚王).

Chen Sheng, setting his capital at Chen County (陳縣; in present-day Huaiyang, Henan), then commissioned various generals to advance in all directions to conquer Qin territory. Among these were: Wu Guang, whom he created acting "King of Chu"; Zhou Wen (周文), whom he ordered to head west toward Qin proper; his friend Wu Chen, whom he ordered to head north toward the old territory of Zhao; Zhou Fu (周敷), whom he ordered to head northeast toward the old territory of Wei. However, none of these generals returned. After initial defeats Qin forces regrouped under general Zhang Han. Wu Guang was assassinated by generals under him; Zhou Wen was defeated by Qin forces; Wu Chen was initially successful but then declared himself the King of Zhao and became independent of Chu; and Zhou Fu supported a descendant of the royal house of Wei to be the King of Wei, also independent of Chu. A major reason why Wu Chen and the generals who assassinated Wu Guang broke away was that Chen Sheng was paranoid as a king: generals were executed at any sign of infidelity, even by rumours. Chen Sheng's ruthlessness and constant defeats in battle made it harder and harder for him to gather followers. Chen Sheng was greatly weakened, and, as he suffered losses at the hands of the Qin army, he personally led a force to try to gather reinforcements, but he was assassinated by his guard Zhuang Jia in c.January 208 BC. He died just five months after his rebellion began. However, his act of defiance provided the spark of inspiration which eventually led to the fall of the Qin dynasty.

== Legacy ==
Chen Sheng was often idealized by versions of history promulgated by Chinese historians as a great leader of the peasants against intolerable oppression of the Qin nobility and bourgeois. Chen Sheng's decisions, while motivated by his desire to overthrow Qin, were often driven by self-interest and an illusory sense of superiority; as a result he often failed to act on good advice. As the Song dynasty historian Sima Guang wrote in the Zizhi Tongjian:

When Chen Sheng first became the King of Chu, his relatives and friends all arrived to join him, as did his father-in-law. But when his father-in-law arrived, Chen treated him as an ordinary guest and only made a slight bow and did not kneel to him. His father-in-law became angry and stated, "You are leading a rebellion and falsely claiming the title of a king, but you are arrogant toward your elders: You surely cannot last." He turned to leave without further discussion, and even though Chen knelt to ask for his forgiveness, he ignored Chen. Later, when there were more and more relatives and friends arriving, they were discussing the stories when Chen was young. Someone suggested, "The old friends and guests of Your Royal Highness are foolish and often liked to talk in vain; they will damage your image and hurt your reputation." Chen executed a good number of his old friends, and therefore his friends began to leave him and not follow him. Chen made Zhou Fang to be his examination minister and Hu Wu to be the head of his guard, to be in charge of intelligence and security. When the generals conquered cities and returned, the two of them often criticized and nit-picked on the commands issued by those generals or their acts; often, if they felt the commands or the acts were not lawful, they would arrest the generals. Chen considered those who are strict to be the most faithful ones. The ones that Chen did not like were either given over to courts martial or personally punished by him. The generals had no affection for Chen, and this led to his downfall.

Chen claimed the title of king only months after the start of his rebellion, without a sufficient foundation. Once he did, he effectively became stuck in Chen County and could not firmly hold territories that were conquered, because the people in the territories did not view him with great affection.

According to Shiji, Chen Sheng was the person who coined the Chinese proverb, "How can a little songbird understand the ambitions of a grand swan!" (燕雀安知鴻鵠志), a saying that figures prominently in the Romance of the Three Kingdoms.

He sometimes appears as a door god in Chinese and Taoist temples, usually paired with Wu Guang.

The pattern of an impostor and his general, founded by Chen Sheng, was closely followed by Han Shantong and Liu Futong in the end of Yuan dynasty.

== See also ==
- Dazexiang Uprising

Titles in pretence
Recreated Dazexiang Uprising Title last held by Lord Changping	— TITULAR — King of Chu; 210 BC – 209 BC	Succeeded by Jing Ju
