= Chen Sheng and Wu Guang uprising =

209 BCE revolt in China

- Part of Late Qin peasant rebellions
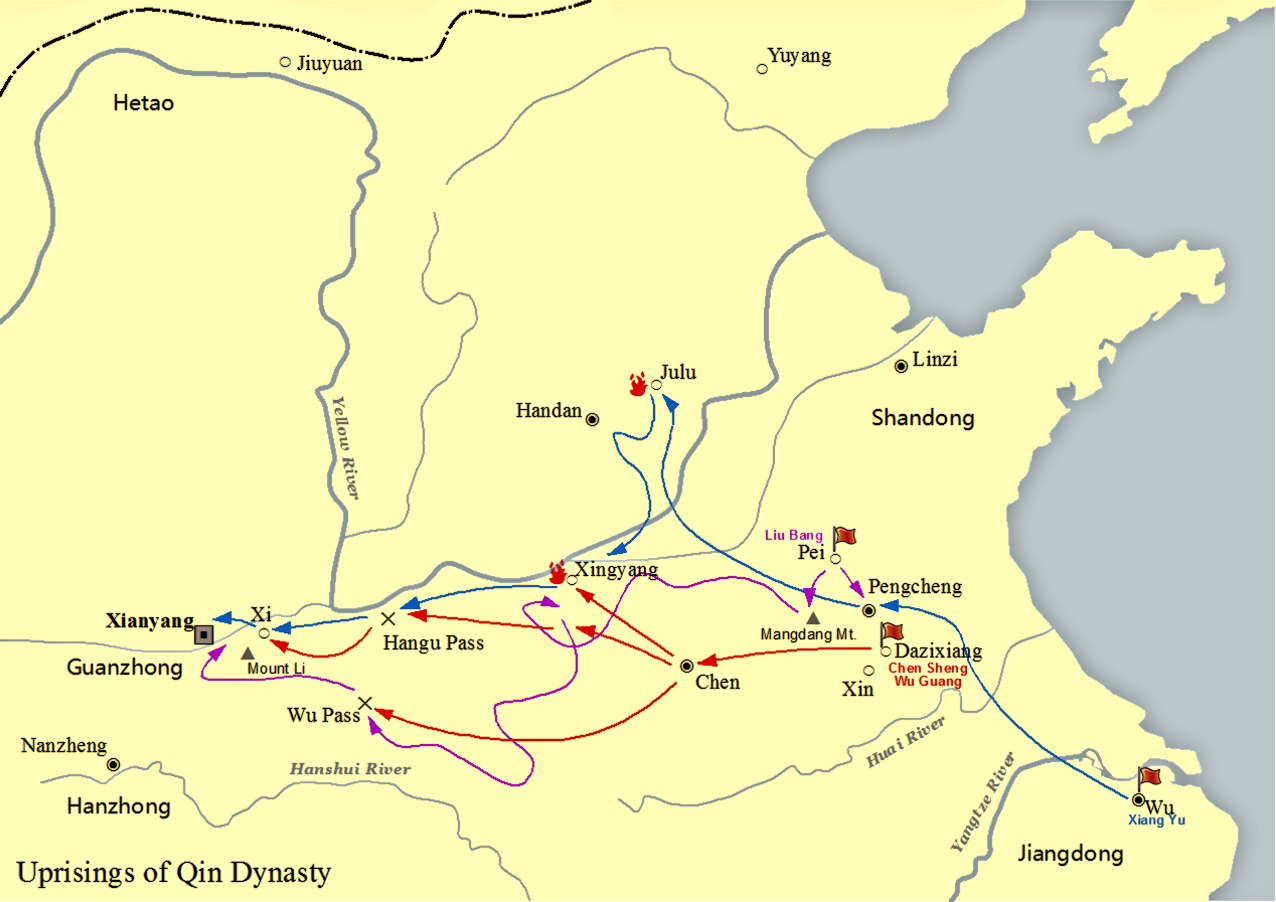
- Uprisings of the Qin dynasty, including Chen Sheng and Wu Guang's Dazexiang uprising.
Date	August or September 209 BC (Note: Records of the Grand Historian dated the start of the uprising to the 7th month of the 1st year of the reign of Qin Er Shi. This corresponds to 9 Aug to 7 Sep 209 BC in the proleptic Julian calendar.) – c.January 208 BC (Note: According to Records of the Grand Historian, Chen Sheng died in the 12th month of the 1st year of the reign of Qin Er Shi. This corresponds to 4 Jan to 1 Feb 208 BC in the proleptic Julian calendar.)
Location	Henan, China
Result	Qin victory

Belligerents
Rebel forces	Qin empire

Commanders and leaders
Chen Sheng †; Wu Guang †	Zhang Han

Strength
900	Unknown

The Chen Sheng and Wu Guang uprising (simplified Chinese: 陈胜吴广起义; traditional Chinese: 陳勝吳廣起義; pinyin: Chén Shèng Wú Guǎng Qǐyì), August 209 B.C.– January 208 B.C., was the first uprising against the Qin dynasty following the death of Qin Shi Huang. Led by Chen Sheng and Wu Guang, the uprising was unsuccessful.

== Name ==
It is also called the Dazexiang uprising (simplified Chinese: 大泽乡起义; traditional Chinese: 大澤鄉起義; pinyin: Dàzéxiāng Qǐyì) as the uprising started in Dazexiang (大泽乡), which translates into "Big Swamp Village".

== History ==
Chen Sheng and Wu Guang were both army officers who were ordered to lead their bands of commoner soldiers north to participate in the defense of Yuyang (simplified Chinese: 渔阳; traditional Chinese: 漁陽). However, they were stopped halfway in present-day Anhui province by flooding from a severe rainstorm. The harsh Qin laws mandated execution for those who showed up late for government jobs, regardless of the nature of the delay. Deciding that they would rather fight than accept execution, Chen and Wu organized a band of 900 villagers to rebel against the government. The current emperor, Huhai, had killed his brother Fusu, who was known for his benevolence, to take the throne, so they rose up in Fusu's name.

There are two stories for this uprising. To convince people to support this uprising, Chen Sheng and Wu Guang wrote "King Chen Sheng" on a piece of silk, and placed it in the belly of a fish. A man in this army bought the fish and was surprised to find the message. They also imitated animal sounds to say "Da Chu flourishes, King Chen Sheng" to make people believe in them.

With Chen's men declaring him king of the former Kingdom of Chu, he and Wu became the centre of armed uprisings all over China. Over the course of just a few months, their strength grew to around ten thousand men, a force composed mostly of discontented peasants. However, in less than a year, their uprising faced serious trouble; their force was no match for the highly skilled battlefield tactics of the professional Qin soldiers and both Chen and Wu were assassinated by their own men.

While their insurrection was ultimately unsuccessful, Wu and Chen set up the example that was to be followed by Liu Bang and Xiang Yu. Their spirit can be summed up in Chen's quote "王侯将相宁有种乎？" (traditional Chinese: 王侯將相寧有種乎, pinyin: wáng hóu jiàng xiàng nìng yǒu zhǒng hū; "Are kings and nobles given their high status by birth?"), meaning that every human, regardless of birth, can become something great if he applies himself.

== Historical materials ==
There is a biography of Chen Sheng and Wu Guang, called the hereditary house of Chen Sheng, as chapter 48 of Records of the Grand Historian.

陳涉少時，嘗與人傭耕。輟耕之壟上，悵恨久之，曰：「苟富貴，無相忘。」傭者笑而應曰：「若為佣耕，何富貴也？」陳涉太息曰：「嗟乎，燕雀安知鴻鵠之志哉！」

When Chen Sheng was young, he worked as a farm laborer. One day, while taking a break on a hill, he sighed and said: "If we become rich, we must not forget each other." The other workers laughed and said: "How could a laborer become rich?" Chen Sheng sighed and said: "Alas, how can a sparrow understand the ambitions of a swan?"

— Sima Qian, Records of the Grand Historian, chapter 48 (陳涉世家)

Later on, Chen Sheng became an army officer, and led the uprising with Wu Guang, his deputy. Wu Guang was a kind and influential man, but little more could be found about him from historical records, other than what was recorded in his joint biography with Chen Sheng.
