= Ziying of Qin =

Ruler of the Qin dynasty during 207 BC

Ying Ziying 嬴子嬰

King of Qin
- Reign: October – December 207 BC
- Predecessor: Qin Er Shi (as emperor)
- Born: Unknown
- Died: January 206 BC
Names
- Ancestral name: Ying (嬴); Clan name: Qin (秦) or Zhao (趙); Given name: Ziying (子嬰)
- House: Ying
- Dynasty: Qin
- Father: Disputed

Ziying
- Traditional Chinese: 子嬰
- Simplified Chinese: 子婴
- Literal meaning: Infant son
Transcriptions
Standard Mandarin
- Hanyu Pinyin: Zǐyīng
Yue: Cantonese
- Yale Romanization: Jíyīng
Old Chinese
- Baxter–Sagart (2014): Tsə′-′eng

Qin Sanshi
- Chinese: 秦三世
- Literal meaning: Qin Third Generation
Transcriptions
Standard Mandarin
- Hanyu Pinyin: Qín Sānshì
Yue: Cantonese
- Yale Romanization: Chèuhn Sāamsai

Qin Shangdi
- Chinese: 秦殤帝
- Literal meaning: Qin Emperor Who Died Young
Transcriptions
Standard Mandarin
- Hanyu Pinyin: Qín Shāngdì
Yue: Cantonese
- Yale Romanization: Chèuhn Sēungdai

Ying Ziying, also known as Ziying, King of Qin (Note: Although the last Qin ruler is often referred to as "Ying Ziying" according to modern Chinese naming conventions, it was not customary to combine ancestral names (姓; xìng) with given names in ancient China.) (Chinese: 秦王子嬰; pinyin: Qín-wáng Zǐyīng, died c. January 206 BC), was the third and last ruler of the Qin dynasty of China. He ruled over a fragmented Qin Empire for 46 days, from mid-October to early December 207 BC. Unlike his predecessor, he ruled as a king instead of emperor. He is referred to in some sources with the posthumous name Emperor Shang of Qin (秦殤帝) although the Qin dynasty had abolished the tradition of according posthumous names to deceased monarchs. (Note: In Chinese tradition, even someone who never held a ruling title while he was alive might be given the posthumous title "emperor" after his death.)

== Identity ==
Ziying's kinship with the Qin imperial family

Zhuangxiang; 281–247 BCE
Shi Huang; 259–210 BCE	Chengjiao; 256–239 BCE	Ziying (#3) d. 206 BCE
Fusu d. 210 BCE	Ziying (#2) d. 206 BCE	Er Shi; 230–207 BCE	Ziying (#4) d. 206 BCE
Ziying (#1) d. 206 BCE

There is no firm consensus as to what Ziying's relationship to the Qin royal family really was.

He is mentioned in historical records as either:

1. A son of Qin Er Shi's elder brother (who, according to Yan Shigu's commentaries, was Fusu);
  二世三年，趙高殺二世後，立二世之兄子公子嬰為秦王。
  In the third year of [Qin] Er Shi (207 BCE), Zhao Gao, after killing [Qin] Er Shi, installed [Qin] Er Shi's elder brother's son Prince Ying as the King of Qin.
  — Sima Qian, Records of the Grand Historian, "Records of Qin Shi Huang"
2. An elder brother of Qin Er Shi;
  三趙高反，二世自殺，高立二世兄子嬰。
  In the third year [of Qin Er Shi], [Zhao] Gao made a coup d'etat, [Qin] Er Shi committed suicide, and [Zhao] Gao crowned [Qin] Er Shi's elder brother Ziying.
  — Sima Qian, Records of the Grand Historian, "Chronology of the Six States"
3. A younger brother of Qin Shi Huang; or
  敘述趙高殺二世後，引皇帝璽自佩，有篡位的意圖，左右百官都不跟從，于是高自知天弗與，群臣弗許，乃召始皇弟，授之璽。子嬰即位，患之，乃稱疾不听事，與宦者韓談及其子謀殺高。
  It is said that Zhao Gao, after killing [Qin] Er Shi, took the Emperor's Seal and had the intention to usurping the throne, but none of the courtiers would join his cause. And so [Zhao] Gao, knowing that his actions were not accepted by Heaven and not supported by the courtiers, summoned [Qin] Shi Huang's younger brother to give him the [Imperial] Seal. Ziying ascended the throne, but was concerned, and claimed illness to remain absent from court, conspiring with the eunuch Han Tan to assassinate [Zhao] Gao.
  — Sima Qian, Records of the Grand Historian, "Chronicle of Li Si"
4. A son of a younger brother of Qin Shi Huang.
  乃召始皇弟子嬰，授之璽。
  ... summoned [Qin] Shi Huang's younger brother's son Ying to give him the [Heirloom] Seal.
  — Xu Guang, Commentaries on Sima Qian's Records of the Grand Historian, "Chronicle of Li Si"

While Sima Qian's Records of the Grand Historian does not specify Ziying's age, it implies that he had at least two sons, whom he consulted.

=== Being Qin Er Shi's nephew ===
According to the analysis of historian Wang Liqun, the maximum possible age of Ziying when Zhao Gao assassinated Qin Er Shi was 19. Therefore, his sons would have probably been around the ages of 1–2, so it was not possible for him to consult them, as a traditional age for them to be old enough to be consulted would have been around 14–16.

However, presuming they were 14–16 in 207 BC, their theoretical great-grandfather (i.e. three generations apart from them) Qin Shi Huang (born 259 BC), if he had been alive, would have only been 52, which would have been highly improbable.

It seems unlikely that Ziying was either Fusu's son or any other grandson of Qin Shi Huang.

=== Being Qin Er Shi's brother ===
Ziying being another elder brother of Huhai (Qin Er Shi) is as unlikely as a grandson of Qin Shi Huang. Since Huhai showed no restraint at killing at least 20 of his siblings after ascending to the throne, sparing one elder brother is possible but rather incredible.

=== Being Qin Shi Huang's brother ===
Li Kaiyuan in his study stated that Qin Shi Huang only had three brothers of any kinds: one paternal half-brother (Chengjiao) and two maternal half-brothers (sons of Lao Ai), therefore Ziying, if indeed being another brother of his, would have had more mentions in Chengjiao's supposed betrayal.

=== Being Qin Shi Huang's nephew ===
Ziying being Zhao Chengjiao's son bore no threat to Huhai's reign and was neither one of Qin Shi Huang's direct descendants nor in a higher position in the succession to Huhai. Ziying was also said to have tried to persuade Huhai not to kill Qin Shi Huang's other sons and daughters, which could have been a difficult task if he was among them.

== Life ==
After Qin Er Shi's death, Zhao Gao chose Ziying to be successor and changed the ruling title "emperor" back to "king" because the Qin dynasty then was as weak as the former Qin State, which no longer ruled the whole of China but held onto only Guanzhong.

Ziying was the only person in the Qin imperial court to defend and to try to persuade Qin Er Shi against the wrongful executions of Meng Tian and Meng Yi. He lured Zhao Gao, the regent who had assassinated Qin Er Shi, into a trap and killed him. Ziying later surrendered to Liu Bang, the leader of the first group of rebel forces to occupy Xianyang, the Qin capital. He was eventually killed, along with his male family members, by another rebel leader, Xiang Yu.

== Legacy ==
Ziying sometimes appears as a door god in Chinese and Taoist temples, usually paired with his successor, Emperor Yi of Chu.

According to the assessment by Han dynasty historian Jia Yi (200–169 BCE), Ziying of Qin was a mediocre sovereign. Historian Ban Gu (AD 32–92) disagreed; he believed Ziying of Qin enthroned the dynasty under its last lag, and he achieved everything he could by assassinating Zhao Gao, the conspiring eunuch that caused the political chaos in the first place, and surrendered the kingdom to the rebel forces, preventing further loss of life and dignity.

== Notes ==
Third Generation of Qin House of Ying Died: 206 BC
Regnal titles
Recreated Title last held by Qin Shi Huang	King of Qin; 207 BC	Extinct
Preceded by Qin Er Shi	Ruler of Qin; 207 BC	Extinct
Preceded by Qin Er Shi	Ruler of China; 207 BC	Succeeded by Xiang Yu and the Seventeen Kings
