= Zhao Gao =

Qin dynasty official

- 趙高

Imperial Chancellor
- In office 208 BC – 207 BC
- Monarch: Qin Er Shi
- Preceded by: Li Si

Prefect of the Gentlemen of the Palace
- In office 209 BC – 208 BC
- Monarch: Qin Er Shi

Prefect of the Office for Imperial Carriages
- In office ? – 209 BC
- Monarch: Qin Shi Huang / Qin Er Shi

Personal details
- Born: Unknown
- Died: 207 BC
- Cause of death: Assassination
- Occupation: Eunuch, politician

Zhao Gao
- Traditional Chinese: 趙高
- Simplified Chinese: 赵高
Transcriptions
Standard Mandarin
- Hanyu Pinyin: Zhào Gāo
- Bopomofo: ㄓㄠˋ ㄍㄠ
- Wade–Giles: Chao^{4} Kao^{1}
- IPA: [ʈʂâʊ káʊ]
Yue: Cantonese
- Yale Romanization: Jiuh Gōu
- Jyutping: Ziu6 Gou1
- IPA: [tsiw˨ kɔw˥]

Zhao Gao (died c. October 207 BC) was a Chinese politician. He was an official of the Qin dynasty of China. Allegedly a eunuch, he served as a close aide to all three rulers of the Qin dynasty – Qin Shi Huang, Qin Er Shi and Ziying – and was regarded as having played an instrumental role in the downfall of the dynasty.

Zhao Gao started his career under Qin Shi Huang as Prefect of the Office for Imperial Carriages (中車府令), an official in charge of managing the palace's horse-drawn carriages. During this period of time, he also served as an attendant to Huhai, Qin Shi Huang's youngest son, and tutored him in the laws of the Qin Empire. In 210 BC, after Qin Shi Huang died in Shaqiu (沙丘; south of present-day Dapingtai Village, Guangzong County, Hebei), Zhao Gao and Li Si, the Chancellor, secretly changed the emperor's final edict, which originally named Fusu, the crown prince, the heir to the throne. In the falsified edict, Fusu was ordered to commit suicide while Huhai was named the new emperor.

After Huhai was enthroned as Qin Er Shi, he promoted Zhao Gao to Prefect of the Gentlemen of the Palace (郎中令), an official post whose duties included managing the daily activities in the imperial palace. Zhao Gao, who was highly trusted by Qin Er Shi, instigated the emperor to exterminate his own siblings to consolidate power, and used the opportunity to eliminate his political opponents, such as Meng Tian and Meng Yi. He also framed Li Si for treason and had Li Si and his entire family executed, after which he replaced Li Si as Chancellor and monopolised state power.

In 207 BC, when rebellions broke out in the lands east of Hangu Pass, Zhao Gao became worried that Qin Er Shi would blame him, so he launched a coup in Wangyi Palace (望夷宮; in Xianyang, near present-day Xi'an, Shaanxi) and assassinated the emperor. Following Qin Er Shi's death, Zhao Gao installed Ziying, Fusu's alleged son, (Note: There is no firm consensus on what Ziying's relationship to the Qin imperial family really was.) on the throne. Ziying then sent Han Tan (韓談), a eunuch, to assassinate Zhao Gao.

== Early life ==
Zhao Gao was distantly related to the royal family of the Zhao state of the Warring States period. According to the Records of the Grand Historian, Zhao Gao's parents committed crimes and were punished. His brothers were castrated; it is unclear whether Zhao Gao himself was a eunuch or not. However, Qin Shi Huang valued Zhao Gao since he was learned in criminal law. This was very useful to Qin Shi Huang since he himself was always looking for ways to control the people by laws and punishments. Zhao Gao enjoyed a steady rise in position.

When Zhao was a minor official, he committed a crime punishable by death. Meng Yi was the official in charge of sentencing and he sentenced Zhao to death and removed him from the officials list as instructed by Qin Shi Huang. Zhao was later pardoned by Qin Shi Huang and returned to his official status.

== Coup following Qin Shi Huang's death ==
At the end of the reign of Qin Shi Huang, Zhao Gao was involved in the death of Meng Tian and his younger brother, Meng Yi. Meng Tian, a reputable general and a supporter of Qin Shi Huang's eldest son, Fusu, was stationed at the northern border, commanding more than 200,000 troops for the inconclusive campaign against the Xiongnu. Following the sudden death of Qin Shi Huang at Shaqiu, Zhao Gao and Li Si, the Chancellor, persuaded the emperor's youngest son, Huhai, to falsify the emperor's will. The fake decree forced Fusu to commit suicide and stripped Meng Tian of his command. Harbouring hatred for the entire Meng family due to his prior sentencing by Meng Yi, Zhao Gao destroyed the Meng brothers by convincing Huhai to issue a decree that forced Meng Tian to commit suicide and execute Meng Yi.

Qin Er Shi, who viewed Zhao Gao as his tutor, became the next Qin emperor.

Two years later, Zhao Gao also killed Li Si, executing him via the "Five Pains" method, Li's own invention. The method consisted of having the victim's nose cut off, cutting off a hand and a foot, then the victim was castrated and finally cut in half in line with the waist. He also had Li Si's entire family exterminated.

In 207 BC, rebellions broke out in the lands east of Hangu Pass. Zhao Gao was afraid that Qin Er Shi might make him responsible for the uprisings. To preempt this, he launched a coup and assassinated Qin Er Shi, and then installed Ziying, Fusu's son, as the new emperor.

Ziying, however, knew that Zhao Gao intended to kill him afterwards to appease the rebels, so he feigned illness on the day of the coronation, which forced Zhao to arrive at his residence to persuade him to attend. The moment Zhao Gao arrived, Ziying ordered a eunuch, Han Tan, to kill Zhao. Zhao Gao's entire clan was exterminated on Ziying's order.

== Calling a deer a horse ==
One chengyu (Chinese idiomatic expression) derived from an incident involving Zhao Gao is "point at a deer and call it a horse" (指鹿為馬; zhǐlùwéimǎ) or "calling a deer a horse", figuratively meaning "deliberate peddling of a falsehood". The Records of the Grand Historian records that Zhao Gao, in an attempt to control the Qin government, devised a loyalty test for court officials using a deer and horse:

Zhao Gao was contemplating treason but was afraid the other officials would not heed his commands, so he decided to test them first. He brought a deer and presented it to the Second Emperor but called it a horse. The Second Emperor laughed and said, "Is the chancellor perhaps mistaken, calling a deer a horse?" Then the emperor questioned those around him. Some remained silent, while some, hoping to ingratiate themselves with Zhao Gao, said it was a horse, and others said it was a deer. Zhao Gao secretly arranged for all those who said it was a deer to be brought before the law and had them executed instantly. Thereafter the officials were all terrified of Zhao Gao. Zhao Gao gained military power as a result of that. (tr. Watson 1993:70)

== Alternative viewpoints ==
The historian Li Kaiyuan (李開元) believes Zhao Gao was not a eunuch at all. He bases this in part on the fact that eunuchs were not allowed to serve as chancellors, which Zhao did. In addition, historians prior to Eastern Han did not explicitly describe Zhao Gao as a eunuch. Archaeological findings of statues from the Qin dynasty also portrayed imperial coachmen, who may have been modelled after Zhao Gao, as bearded non-eunuchs.

Another historian, Xin Deyong (辛德勇), disputes the claim that Zhao Gao was not a eunuch.

== Notes ==
Political offices
Preceded by Li Si; Feng Quji	Chancellor of China; 208–207 BC	Succeeded by Xiao He
