= Qin Er Shi =

Emperor of China from 210 to 207 BC

Qin Er Shi 秦二世
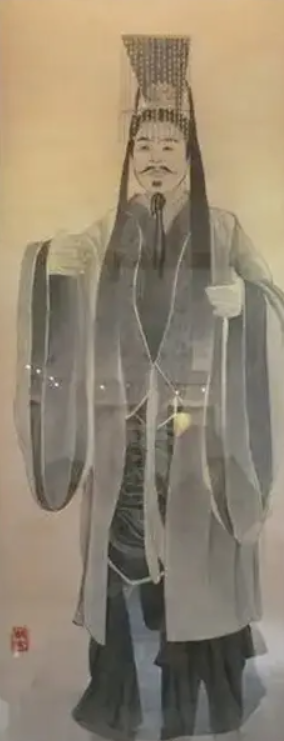
- Imaginary portrait at the Mausoleum of Qin Er Shi Site Museum

Emperor of the Qin dynasty
- Reign: 210 – October 207 BC
- Predecessor: Qin Shi Huang
- Successor: Ziying (as king of Qin)
- Born: 229 BC
- Died: October 207 BC (aged 22)
Full name
- Family name: Ying (嬴); Given name: Huhai (胡亥)
Regnal name
- Er Shi Huangdi (二世皇帝)
- House: Ying
- Dynasty: Qin
- Father: Qin Shi Huang

Qin Er Shi
- Chinese: 秦二世
- Literal meaning: Qin second generation
Transcriptions
Standard Mandarin
- Hanyu Pinyin: Qín Èrshì
- Bopomofo: ㄑㄧㄣˊ ㄦˋ ㄕˋ
- Wade–Giles: Ch'in^{2} Erh^{4}-shih^{4}
- IPA: [tɕʰǐn âɚ.ʂɻ̩̂]
Yue: Cantonese
- Yale Romanization: Chèuhn Yihsai
- Jyutping: ceon4 ji6 sai3
- IPA: [tsʰɵn˩ ji˨.sɐj˧]

Huhai
- Chinese: 胡亥
Transcriptions
Standard Mandarin
- Hanyu Pinyin: Húhài
- Bopomofo: ㄏㄨˊ ㄏㄞˋ
- Wade–Giles: Hu^{2}-hai^{4}
- IPA: [xǔ.xâɪ]
Yue: Cantonese
- Yale Romanization: Wùhhoih
- Jyutping: wu4 hoi6
- IPA: [wu˩.hɔj˨]
Old Chinese
- Baxter–Sagart (2014): *Ga-gə′

Qin Er Shi (229 – 207 BC), given name Huhai, was the second emperor of the Chinese Qin dynasty, reigning from 210 to 207 BC. The son of Qin Shi Huang, he was put on the throne by Li Si and Zhao Gao, circumventing his brother Fusu, who had been the designated heir. Upon Huhai's ascension, both Fusu and the popular general Meng Tian were killed on the orders of Li and Zhao, with Qin Er Shi's role in the assassinations remaining uncertain and controversial. A weak ruler, Qin Er Shi's reign was completely dominated by Zhao Gao, who eventually forced him to commit suicide. By the time of his death, the Qin Empire's power had lessened so much that his successor Ziying ruled as a king, not emperor.

== Early life ==
Huhai (Chinese: 胡亥) was the personal name of the Second Emperor. Its Old Chinese pronunciation has been reconstructed as Ga-gə′. Although his parentage was questioned by many historians including Sima Qian, they accepted Qin Er Shi as a member of the state of Qin's House of Ying. Huhai was the eighteenth son of Qin Shi Huang. As the youngest son, he was doted on by his father. It is not clear who his mother was, although most likely she was "The Hu (barbarian) princess" Hu Ji (胡姬). Although he is sometimes known as "Ying Huhai" according to the practice of modern Chinese names, the ancient custom was not to combine the names in this way: his personal name never appears in combination with Ying, Zhao, or Qin. From an early age, Huhai was apprenticed to the minister Zhao Gao to learn Legalism, by the decree of Qin Shi Huang. There is a possibility that Hu Ji was a princess from the Greco-Bactrian Euthydemid dynasty offered to Ying Zheng as an alliance gift from neighboring Gansu in 230 BC.

== Ascension to throne ==
Qin Shi Huang died during one of his tours of eastern China in the summer of 210 BC at the palace in Shaqiu. The announcement of his death was withheld until the entourage, which was accompanied by Premier Li Si and the imperial court, returned to the capital, Xianyang, two months later. Nevertheless, Huhai and Zhao Gao were aware of Qin Shi Huang's death and began plotting an internal intrigue.

The eldest son Fusu was supposed to be elected as the next emperor. However, Li Si and the chief eunuch Zhao Gao conspired to kill Fusu to get rid of Meng Tian, Fusu's favourite general and their court rival. They were afraid that if Fusu were enthroned, they would lose their power. Li Si and Zhao Gao forged a fake edict by Qin Shi Huang ordering both Fusu and Meng to commit suicide. Their plan worked, and the younger son, Huhai, acceded the throne to become the second emperor, later known as Qin Er Shi. However, findings of bamboo strips dating from the time of the intrigue note that Huhai was elected and killed his brother. That would indicate that the fake edict, in the case of Fusu, was an imperial cover story.

== Second Emperor of Qin ==
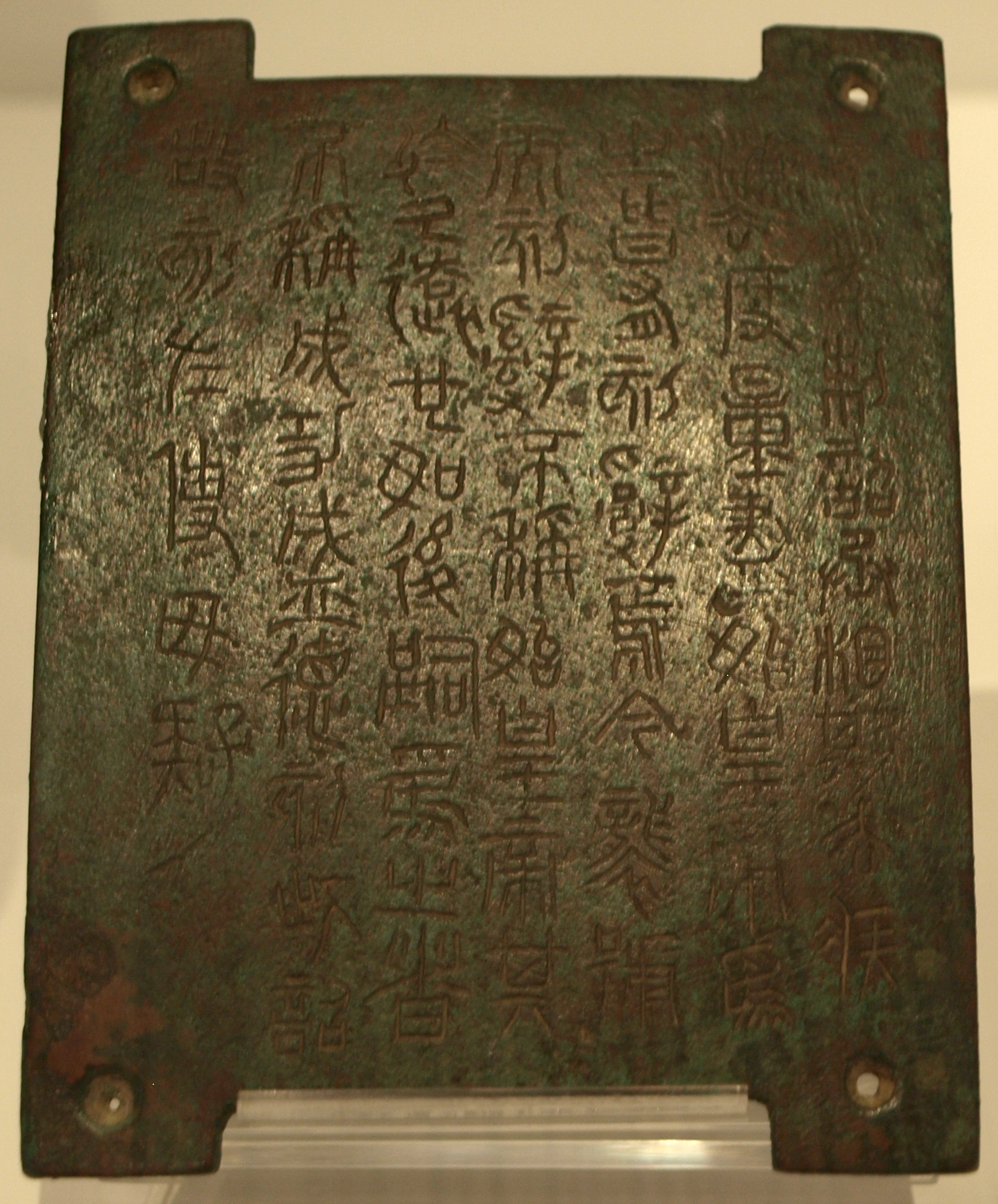
An edict in bronze from the reign of the second Qin Emperor

In the first year of his reign in 210 BC, Huhai was made the second emperor of Qin at the age of 19. His regnal name Qin Er Shi means 'second generation of the Qin', and is a contraction of Qin Er Shi Huangdi (秦二世皇帝). The name followed the nomenclature established by the First Emperor, who envisioned an empire that would last for ten thousand generations and for his successors to bear the aspiration in their reign names. The practice ended abruptly with the third emperor, Ziying, when the Qin dynasty was overturned by Chu and Han.

Qin Er Shi depended on the eunuch Zhao Gao so much so that he acted as a puppet emperor, with the eunuch as puppeteer. Zhao Gao was made the Qin prime minister during Qin Er Shi's reign, which was cruel and brought much suffering to the people. From his reign onwards, the Qin dynasty declined.

After one of the tours, Zhao Gao suggested for him to examine the governors and military commandants and to punish those guilty of some crime. That way, he could do away with those who disapproved of the emperor's actions. Six imperial princes were killed at Tu (杜). The emperor then further punished people for petty crimes. The emperor's brother Jianglu (將閭) and two other brothers were imprisoned. A messenger was then sent to read them a death sentence. Jianglu looked to the heavens and cried out loud three times that he did not commit any crime. All three brothers cried and drew their own swords to commit suicide. Zhao Gao said that the second emperor was young and that as the Son of Heaven, his own voice must never be heard, and his face must never be shown. Accordingly, the emperor remained in the inner palaces and consulted only with Zhao Gao. Therefore, the high ministers rarely had the opportunity to see the emperor in court.

=== Revolts ===
Bandits and brigands grew in numbers from different directions to attack the Qin. Military leaders such as Chen Sheng delegitimized the rule of Qin Er Shi by claiming Fusu should have been made ruler. One of the immediate revolts was the Dazexiang Uprising in 209. The rebellion occurred in the territory that was formerly Chu state and claimed to be restoring Chu's greatness.

Overall, Qin Er Shi was not able to contend with nationwide rebellions. He was not as capable as his father, and many revolts against him quickly erupted. His reign was a time of extreme civil unrest, and everything the First Emperor had worked for crumbled away within a short period. Later, an envoy reported about the rebellion in court. The emperor was enraged, and the envoy was punished. Then, all other envoys reporting about uprisings would say that the bandits were being pursued and captured. Without any need to worry, the emperor was pleased.

=== Death of allies ===
The bandits and brigands continued to grow in numbers. The chancellor Feng Quqi, Li Si and the general Feng Jie came forward to complain that the Qin military could not hold off the increasing number of revolts. They suggested for the construction of Epang Palace to be suspended lest the burden of tax should be too heavy. The emperor then questioned their loyalty. All three of them were handed over to law officials, who subjected them to examinations to see if they were guilty of other crimes. Feng Quqi and Feng Jie committed suicide to avoid enduring disgrace. Li Si was put in prison, and then killed via The Five Pains punishment. Zhao Gao continued to push the emperor to find associates with loyalty and to punish those who showed disloyalty with more severe penalties. Meng Yi and other chief ministers were executed. Twelve of the princes were executed in a marketplace in Xianyang. Ten princesses in Du were executed and their bodies were torn apart.

=== Horse and deer test ===
On 27 September 207 BC, the eunuch Zhao Gao tested his power against the emperor's. He presented a deer to the Second Emperor but called it a horse. The emperor laughed and said, "Is the chancellor perhaps mistaken, calling a deer a horse?" He questioned those around him. Some remained silent, and some aligned with Zhao Gao and called it a horse. Zhao Gao executed every official who had called it a deer. This incident provides the modern Chinese chengyu "point to a deer and call it a horse" (指鹿為馬 zhǐlù wéimǎ).

== Dynastic collapse ==
Although Qin managed to suppress most of the nationwide rebellions, they still caused serious damage. Qin's manpower and supplies were greatly reduced. Qin was decisively defeated at the Battle of Julu. Court plots led Zhang Han to surrender along with his soldiers, which later led to the live burial of 200,000 Qin troops. In total, Qin lost over 300,000 men. Even then, Qin Er Shi failed to grasp the severity of the defeat, erroneously thinking that Qin had many more spare troops due to courtiers hiding the truth from him in fear of execution. Finally, a daring and loyal eunuch told Qin Er Shi the truth. Shocked, Qin Er Shi tried to capture Zhao Gao and to hold him responsible.

Zhao Gao, however, had expected that Qin Er Shi would ask him to take the blame. Therefore, Zhao Gao conspired with his loyal soldiers to force the emperor to commit suicide. Surrounded and with no means of escape, Qin Er Shi asked the loyal eunuch why he had not told the truth earlier. The eunuch replied that it was Qin Er Shi himself who had decided to execute anyone who would tell him the truth.

In 207 BC, the Qin dynasty collapsed only fifteen years after it had been established. Ziying of Qin, allegedly a son of Fusu—there is no consensus as to his actual relationship to the house of Qin—was made "king of Qin state", a reduced title. Ziying soon killed Zhao Gao and surrendered to Liu Bang one year later.

== Death and burial ==
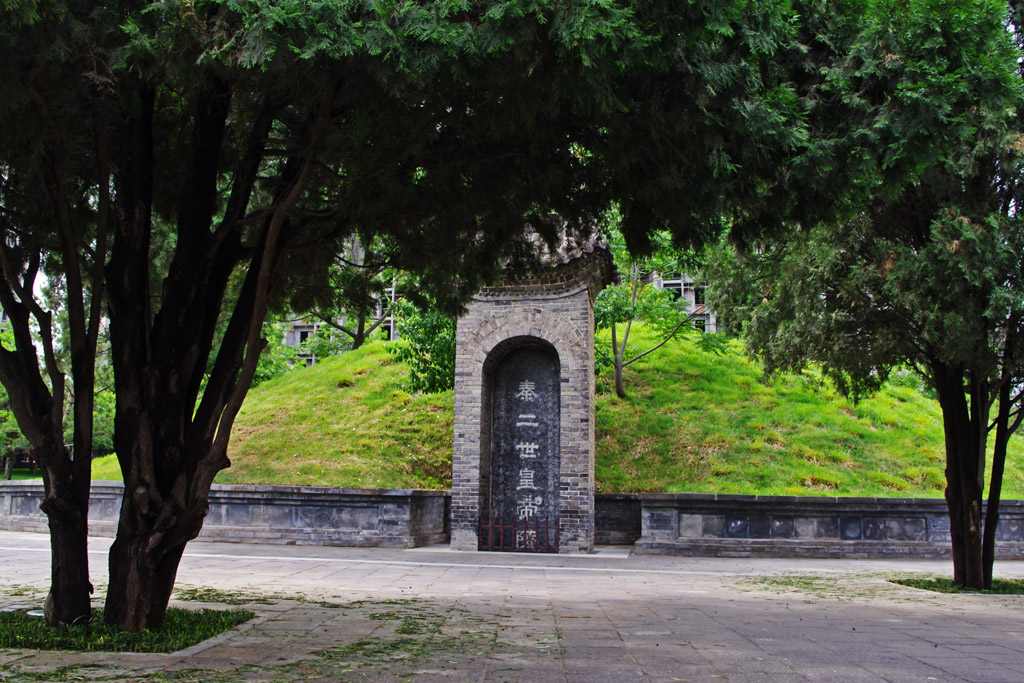
Tomb of Qin Er Shi

Qin Er Shi reigned only for three years and was forced to commit suicide eventually by Zhao Gao at the age of 22. Qin Er Shi was condemned by Zhao Gao after his death and was denied a royal burial. He was buried in modern Xi'an, near the Wild Goose Pagoda. Compared to his father, his tomb is much less elaborate and does not have a Terracotta Army. Qin Er Shi did not have a temple name.

== Bibliography ==
- Loewe, Michael (2000). A Biographical Dictionary of the Qin, Former Han and Xin Periods (221 BC - AD 24). Leiden: Brill. ISBN 978-90-04-10364-1.
- Loewe, Michael (2004). The Men Who Governed Han China: Companion to a Biographical Dictionary of the Qin, Former Han and Xin Periods. Leiden: Brill. ISBN 978-90-04-13845-2.
- Xiong, Victor Cunrui; Hammond, Kenneth J. (2019). Routledge Handbook of Imperial Chinese History. London: Routledge. ISBN 978-0-367-58051-3.

Qin Er Shi House of Ying Born: 229 BC Died: 207 BC
Regnal titles
Preceded by Qin Shi Huang	Emperor of China; Qin dynasty 210–207 BC	Succeeded by Qin San Shi
