= Qin dynasty =

Imperial dynasty of China (221–206 BC)

Qin 秦
- 221–206 BC
- Territory of the Qin dynasty, (Note: Per Brian Lander: "While most maps of the Qin Empire depict the south as solidly Qin territory, in fact Qin only had administrative control over a few areas south of the Yangzi River, most notably the lowlands of the central Yangzi valley that it had conquered from Chu. Across the vast regions south of the Yangzi—most of which were hilly and densely forested—Qin controlled nothing more than a scattered network of garrisons connected by river and land routes. In retrospect, Qin's penetration of the far south was a key event in the Chinese colonization of what is now South China, but it was a minor concern of the Qin rulers.") with population centres and segments of the Great Wall marked
- Capital: Xianyang
- Common languages: Old Chinese
- Government: Absolute monarchy
- Emperor
  - 221–210 BC: Qin Shi Huang
  - 210–207 BC: Qin Er Shi
- Chancellor
  - 221–208 BC: Li Si
  - 208–207 BC: Zhao Gao
- Historical era: Imperial
  - Founding of the state of Qin: 770 BC
  - Accession of Qin Shi Huang: 221 BC
  - Death of Qin Shi Huang: 210 BC
  - Surrender to Liu Bang: 207 BC
  - Destruction of Xianyang: 206 BC

Area
- 220 BC: 2,300,000 km^{2} (890,000 sq mi)
- Currency: Banliang
Preceded by
Zhou dynasty
Qin (state)
Succeeded by
Eighteen Kingdoms
Han dynasty
Nanyue

Chinese name
- Chinese: 秦
- Hanyu Pinyin: Qín
Transcriptions
Standard Mandarin
- Hanyu Pinyin: Qín
- Bopomofo: ㄑㄧㄣˊ
- Wade–Giles: Chʻin^{2}
- Tongyong Pinyin: Cín
- Yale Romanization: Chín
- IPA: [tɕʰǐn]
Wu
- Romanization: Zin
Yue: Cantonese
- Yale Romanization: Chèuhn
- Jyutping: Ceon4
- IPA: [tsʰɵn˩]
Southern Min
- Hokkien POJ: Chîn
- Tâi-lô: Tsîn
Old Chinese
- Baxter–Sagart (2014): *[dz]i[n]

The Qin dynasty (/tʃɪn/ CHIN) was the first imperial dynasty of China. It is named for its progenitor state of Qin, a fief of the confederal Zhou dynasty (c. 1046–256 BC). Beginning in 230 BC, the Qin under King Ying Zheng engaged in a series of wars conquering each of the rival states that had previously pledged fealty to the Zhou. This culminated in 221 BC with the successful unification of China. The Qin then assumed an imperial prerogative – with Ying Zheng declaring himself to be Qin Shi Huang, the first emperor of China, and bringing an end to the Warring States period (c. 475–221 BC). This state of affairs lasted until 206 BC, when the dynasty collapsed in the years following Qin Shi Huang's death. The Qin dynasty's 14-year existence was the shortest of any major dynasty in Chinese history, with only two emperors. However, the succeeding Han dynasty (202 BC – 220 AD) largely continued the military and administrative practices instituted by the Qin; as a result, the Qin have been credited as the originators of the Chinese imperial system that would endure in some form until the Xinhai Revolution in 1911.

Qin was a minor power for the first several centuries of its existence; its strength greatly increased in the 4th century BC, in large part owing to the administrative and military reforms of Shang Yang. They sought to create a strong, centralised state and a large army supported by a stable economy, which were developed in the Qin homeland and implemented across China following its unification. Reforms included the standardisation of currency, weights, measures, and the writing system, along with innovations in weaponry, transportation and military tactics.

The central government sought to undercut aristocrats and landowners and administer the peasantry directly, who comprised the vast majority of the population. This enabled numerous large-scale construction projects involving the labour of hundreds of thousands of peasants and convicts – which included the connection of walls along the northern border into what would eventually become the Great Wall of China, a large national road system, and the city-sized Mausoleum of Qin Shi Huang guarded by the life-sized Terracotta Army. The state possessed an unprecedented capacity to transform the environment through the management of people and land; as a result, Qin's rise has been characterised as one of the most important events in East Asian environmental history.

When Qin Shi Huang died in 210 BC, two of his advisors placed an heir on the throne in an attempt to exert control over the dynasty and wield state power. These advisors squabbled among themselves, resulting in both of their deaths and that of the second Qin emperor. Popular revolt broke out, and the weakened empire soon fell to Chu generals Xiang Yu and Liu Bang, the latter of whom founded the Han dynasty.

== History ==
=== Origin and development, 9th century – 230 BC ===
According to the Shiji (c. 91 BC), during the 9th century BC, Feizi – said to be a descendant of the legendary political advisor Gao Yao – was granted rule over the settlement of Qin (秦邑; modern Qingshui County, Gansu). During the rule of King Xiao of Zhou, this area became known as the state of Qin. In 897 BC, during the Gonghe Regency, the area was allocated as a dependency dedicated to raising horses. In the late 8th century BC, one of Feizi's descendants, Duke Zhuang of Qin, was summoned by the Zhou to take part in a military campaign against the Western Rong; the effort was successful and Zhuang was rewarded with additional territory. In 770 BC, Zhuang's son Duke Xiang helped escort the Zhou court under King Ping in their emergency evacuation from Fenghao to Chengzhou under threat from the Western Rong – marking the divide between the Western and Eastern Zhou periodisations. As a reward, Duke Xiang was sent as the leader of an expedition against the Western Rong to recapture the territory they had taken, during which he formally established the Qin as a major vassal state, incorporating Fenghao and much of the territory previously under direct Zhou control and thus expanding Qin eastward.

The state of Qin began military expeditions into central China in 672 BC, initially refraining from serious incursions due to the threat still posed by neighbouring tribes to their west; by the 4th century BC, they had all either been subdued or conquered, setting the stage for Qin expansionism.

==== Warring States period, c. 475–230 BC ====
Territories of the Seven Warring States c. 250 BC, with the former capital of the Zhou royal family at Luoyang marked: Qin; Zhao; Yan; Wei; Qi; Han; Chu

During the Warring States period (c. 475–221 BC), the Qin statesman Shang Yang introduced a series of advantageous military reforms between 359 BC and his execution in 338. He also helped to construct the Qin capital at Xianyang (near modern Xi'an, Shaanxi) on the Wei River near the former Zhou capital of Fenghao – , a city which ultimately resembled the capitals of the other states. The Qin maintained a military that was superior in both doctrine and practice to that of the other Warring States. Its army was large, efficient, and staffed with capable generals. Unlike many of their enemies, the Qin utilised contemporary advancements in weapons technology and transportation, the latter of which enabled greater mobility across the different types of terrain throughout China.

The geography of Qin's core territories – located at the heart of a region known as the Guanzhong – provided additional advantages, including fertile farmland, and a strategic position protected by mountains that made it a natural stronghold. The Guanzhong was in contrast with the flat, open Yangtze valley (also known as the "Guandong") to its south-east – during this period, Xianyang was the only capital city in China that did not require walls to be built around it. The legacy of Qin society within the Guanzhong inspired a Han-era adage that "Guanzhong produces generals, while Guandong produces ministers." The Qin's agricultural output helped sustain their large army, first expanded by Shang Yang's reforms and irrigation projects, and later via projects like the Wei River canal in 246 BC, said to have been engineered by Zheng Guo.

Qin engaged in practical and ruthless warfare. From the preceding Spring and Autumn period (c. 770 – c. 481 BC), the prevailing philosophy had dictated war as a gentleman's activity; military commanders were instructed to respect what they perceived to be Heaven's laws in battle. For example, during a war Duke Xiang of Song was waging against Chu, he declined an opportunity to attack Chu forces that were crossing a river. After allowing them to cross and marshal their forces, he was decisively defeated in the ensuing battle. When he was admonished by his advisors for excessive courtesy to the enemy, he retorted, "The sage does not crush the feeble, nor give the order for attack until the enemy have formed their ranks." The Qin disregarded this military tradition, taking advantage of their enemy's weaknesses. A nobleman in the state of Wei accused Qin of being "avaricious, perverse, eager for profit, and without sincerity. It knows nothing about etiquette, proper relationships, and virtuous conduct, and if there be an opportunity for material gain, it will disregard its relatives as if they were animals." This, combined with strong leadership from long-lived rulers, an openness to employ talented men from other states, and a lack of internal opposition, contributed to the Qin's strong political base.

=== Unification and expansion, 230–210 BC ===
During the Warring States period, the seven major states vying for dominance were Qin, Yan, Zhao, Qi, Chu, Han, and Wei. The rulers of these states styled themselves as kings, as opposed to the titles of lower nobility they had previously held. However, none elevated himself to believe that he had the Mandate of Heaven as claimed by the kings of Zhou, nor that he had the right to offer sacrifices.

During the century that preceded the wars of unification, the Qin suffered several setbacks. Shang Yang was executed in 338 BC by King Huiwen due to a personal grudge harboured from his youth. There was also internal strife over the Qin succession in 307 BC, which decentralised Qin authority somewhat. The Qin was defeated by an alliance of the other states in 295 BC; this was soon followed by another defeat inflicted by Zhao, made possible by a majority of the Qin army already being occupied with defending against attacks by Qi. However, the aggressive Fan Sui became prime minister in 266 BC; after issues with the succession were resolved, Fan pursued an expansionist policy that had its origins in Jin and Qi, in which they endeavoured to conquer the other states.

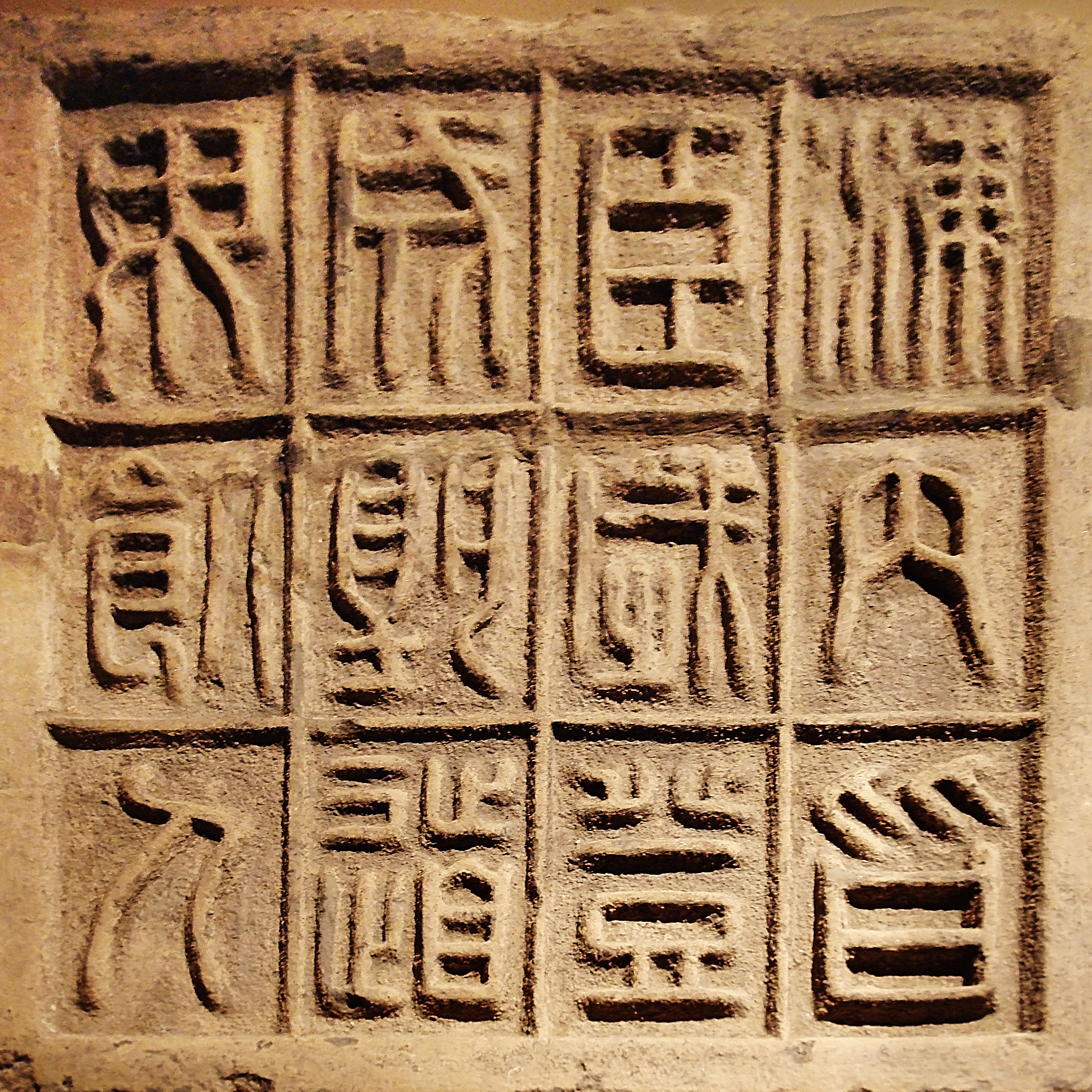
Stone slab bearing an inscription stating that it is an auspicious moment for Qin Shi Huang to ascend to the throne, that the country is united, and that no one will be dying on the roads. (Note: The inscription reads: 海内皆臣、歲登成熟、道毋飢人.)

The Qin first attacked the Han directly to their east, and took their capital city of Xinzheng in 230 BC. They then struck the state of Zhao to their north, who surrendered in 228 BC, followed by the northernmost state of Yan in 226. Next, Qin launched assaults to the east and south; they took the Wei capital of Daliang (modern Kaifeng) in 225, and forced Chu to surrender in 223. They then deposed the Zhou dynasty's remnants at Luoyang; finally, they conquered Qi, taking their capital at Linzi in 221 BC.

With the completion of Qin's conquests in 221 BC, King Zheng – who had acceded to the throne of Qin at age nine – became the effective ruler of China. The subjugation of the six states was done by King Zheng who had used efficient persuasion and exemplary strategy. He solidified his position as sole ruler with the abdication of his prime minister, Lü Buwei. The states made by the emperor were assigned to officials dedicated to the task rather than place the burden on people from the royal family. He then combined the titles of the earlier Three Sovereigns and Five Emperors into the new name "Shi Huangdi", meaning 'First Emperor'. The newly declared emperor ordered all weapons not in the possession of the Qin to be confiscated and melted down. The resulting metal was sufficient to build twelve large ornamental statues at the Qin's newly declared capital at Xianyang.

==== Southward expansion, 214–206 BC ====
In 214 BC, Qin Shi Huang secured his boundaries to the north with a fraction (roughly 100,000 men) of his large army, and sent the majority (500,000 men) of his army to conquer the territory to their south, which was inhabited by the Baiyue peoples. Prior to Qin's campaigns unifying the former Zhou territories, the Baiyue had gained possession of much of Sichuan to their southwest. The Qin army was unfamiliar with the jungle terrain, and it was defeated by the southern tribes' guerrilla warfare tactics with over 100,000 men lost. However, in the defeat Qin was successful in building a canal to the south, which they used heavily for supplying and reinforcing their troops during their second attack to the south. Building on these gains, the Qin armies conquered the coastal lands surrounding Guangzhou, and took the provinces of Fuzhou and Guilin. They may have struck as far south as Hanoi. After these victories in the south, Qin Shi Huang moved over 100,000 prisoners and exiles to colonise the newly conquered area. In terms of extending the boundaries of his empire, Qin Shi Huang was extremely successful in the south.

==== Campaign against the Xiongnu, 215 BC ====
The Qin collectively referred to the peoples living on their northern border as the Five Barbarians; while sporadically subject to imperial rule, they remained free from it for the majority of the Qin's existence. Prohibited from engaging in trade with local Qin peasantry, the Xiongnu inhabiting the Ordos Desert to the Qin's north-west frequently raided them instead. In retaliation, a military campaign was led by the Qin general Meng Tian. The region was conquered in 215 BC, and agriculture was established; however, the local peasants were discontented and later revolted.

=== Collapse and aftermath, 210–202 BC ===
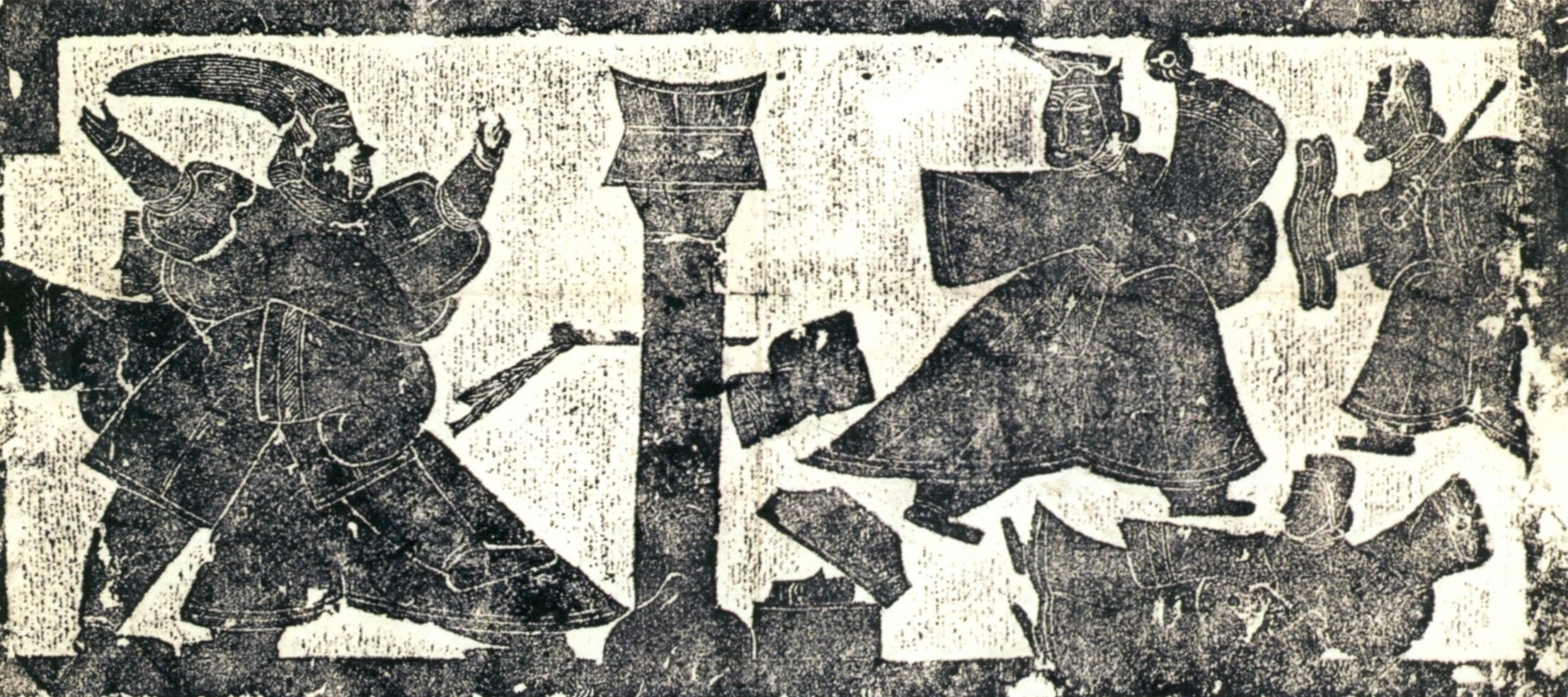
Rubbing of a Han-era stone relief depicting the 227 BC assassination attempt on the future Qin Shi Huang (right) by Jing Ke (left). Jing is held by a court physician (background), as a soldier (far right) rushes to save the emperor, who holds an imperial jade disc. Jing's dagger (centre) has become stuck in a pillar.

In total, three assassination attempts were made on Qin Shi Huang – one in 227 BC by Jing Ke, and the other two around 218 BC. Owing in part to these incidents, the emperor became paranoid and obsessed with immortality. While on a trip to the eastern frontiers in 210 BC, Qin Shi Huang died in an attempt to procure an elixir of immortality from Taoist magicians, who claimed the elixir was stuck on an island guarded by a sea monster. The chief eunuch, Zhao Gao, and the prime minister, Li Si, hid the news of his death upon their return until they were able to alter his will. It is understood that his eldest son Fusu was intended to inherit the throne; however, Li and Zhao conspired to transmit a fabricated order for Fusu to commit suicide, and instead elevated the former emperor's son Huhai to the throne, taking the name of Qin Er Shi. They believed that they would be able to manipulate Huhai to their own ends, effectively allowing them to exert control over the empire. As expected, Qin Er Shi proved inept: he executed many ministers and imperial princes, continued massive building projects – one of the most extravagant was the lacquering of the city's walls – enlarged the army, increased taxes, and arrested messengers who delivered bad news. As a result, men from all over China revolted, attacking officials, raising armies, and declaring themselves kings of seized territories.

During this time, Li Si and Zhao Gao came into conflict with one another, which culminated in Zhao persuading Qi Er Shi to put Li on trial, where he was ultimately executed. The worsening military situation then caused the emperor to blame Zhao for the rebellion; this pivot frightened Zhao, who engineered another conspiracy to deceive Qin Er Shi into believing hostile forces had arrived at the capital. The emperor's quarters were invaded, and Qin Er Shi was forced to commit suicide for his incompetence after being cornered by Zhao's co-conspirator and son-in-law Yan Le. Ziying, a son of Fusu, ascended to the throne, and immediately executed Zhao Gao. Unrest continued to spread among the people – caused in large part by regional differences, which had persisted despite Qin's attempts to impose uniformity – and many local officials had declared themselves kings. In this climate, Ziying attempted to cling to his throne by declaring himself as merely one king among all the others. He was undermined by his ineptitude, and popular revolt broke out in 209 BC. When Chu rebels under the lieutenant Liu Bang attacked, a state in such turmoil could not hold for long. Ziying surrendered to Liu Bang upon the latter's arrival in Xianyang in 207 BC; while initially spared by Liu, he was executed shortly thereafter by the Chu leader Xiang Yu. In 206 BC, Xianyang was destroyed, marking what historians consider to be the end of the imperial Qin dynasty. (Note: Qin Shi Huang stated that the dynasty would last 10,000 generations; it lasted less than 15 years.) With the former Qin territories temporarily divided into the Eighteen Kingdoms, Liu Bang then betrayed Xiang Yu, beginning the Chu–Han Contention from which he ultimately emerged victorious atop a reunited realm – on 28 February 202 BC, he declared himself emperor of the newly founded Han dynasty.

== Culture and society ==
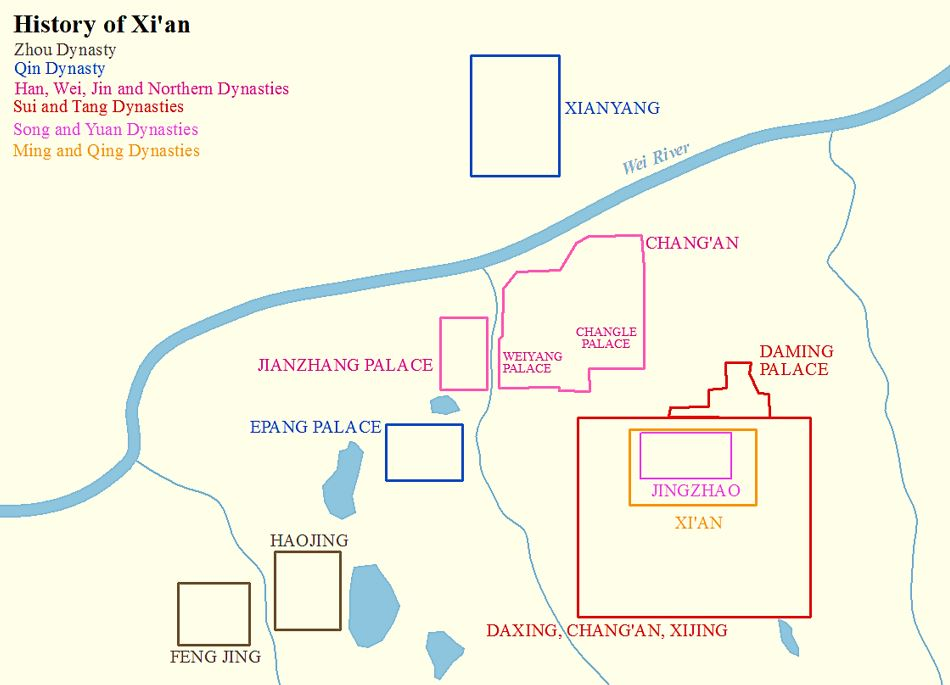
Layout of the palace's surroundings

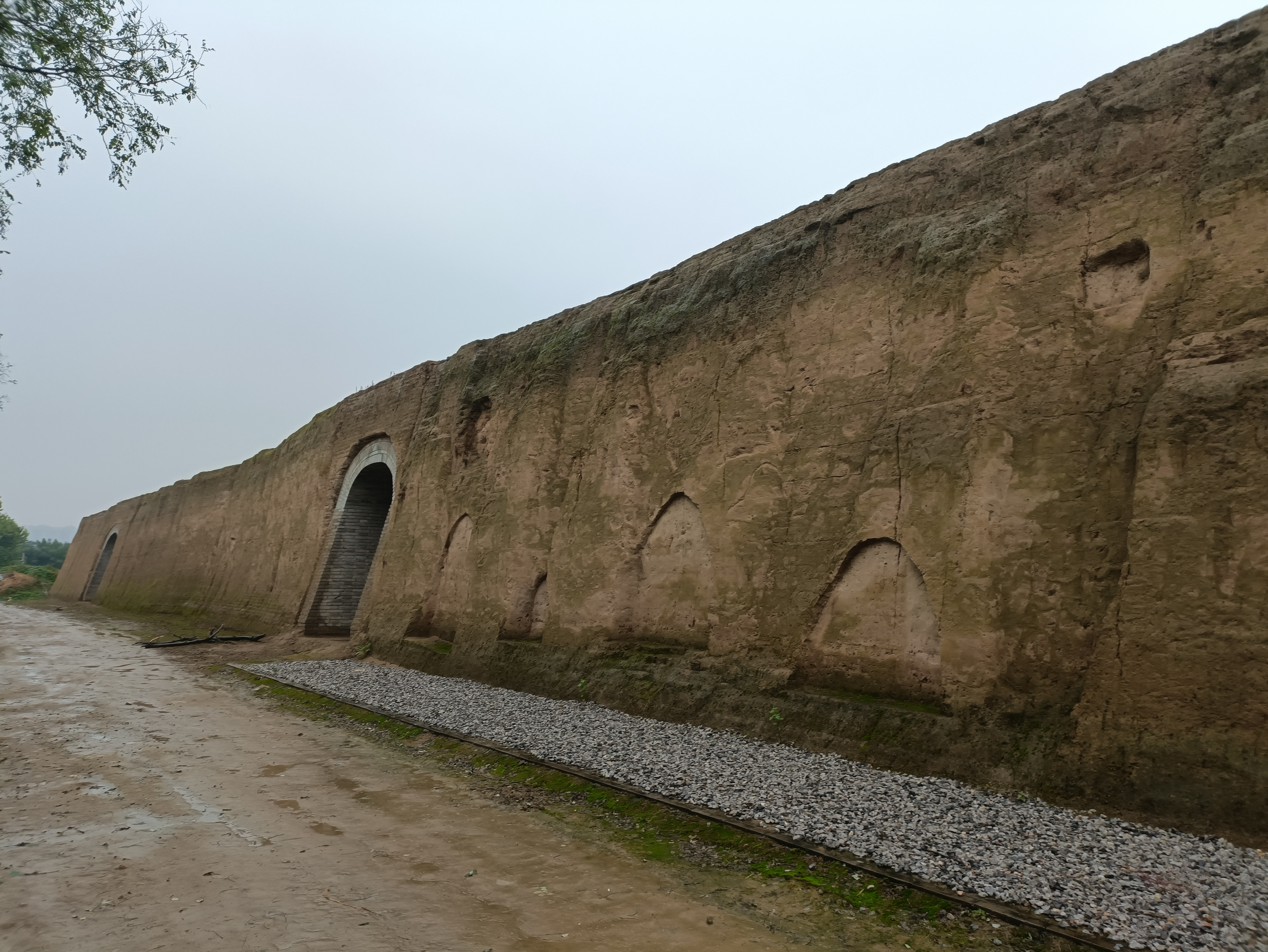
Excavation of the western platform

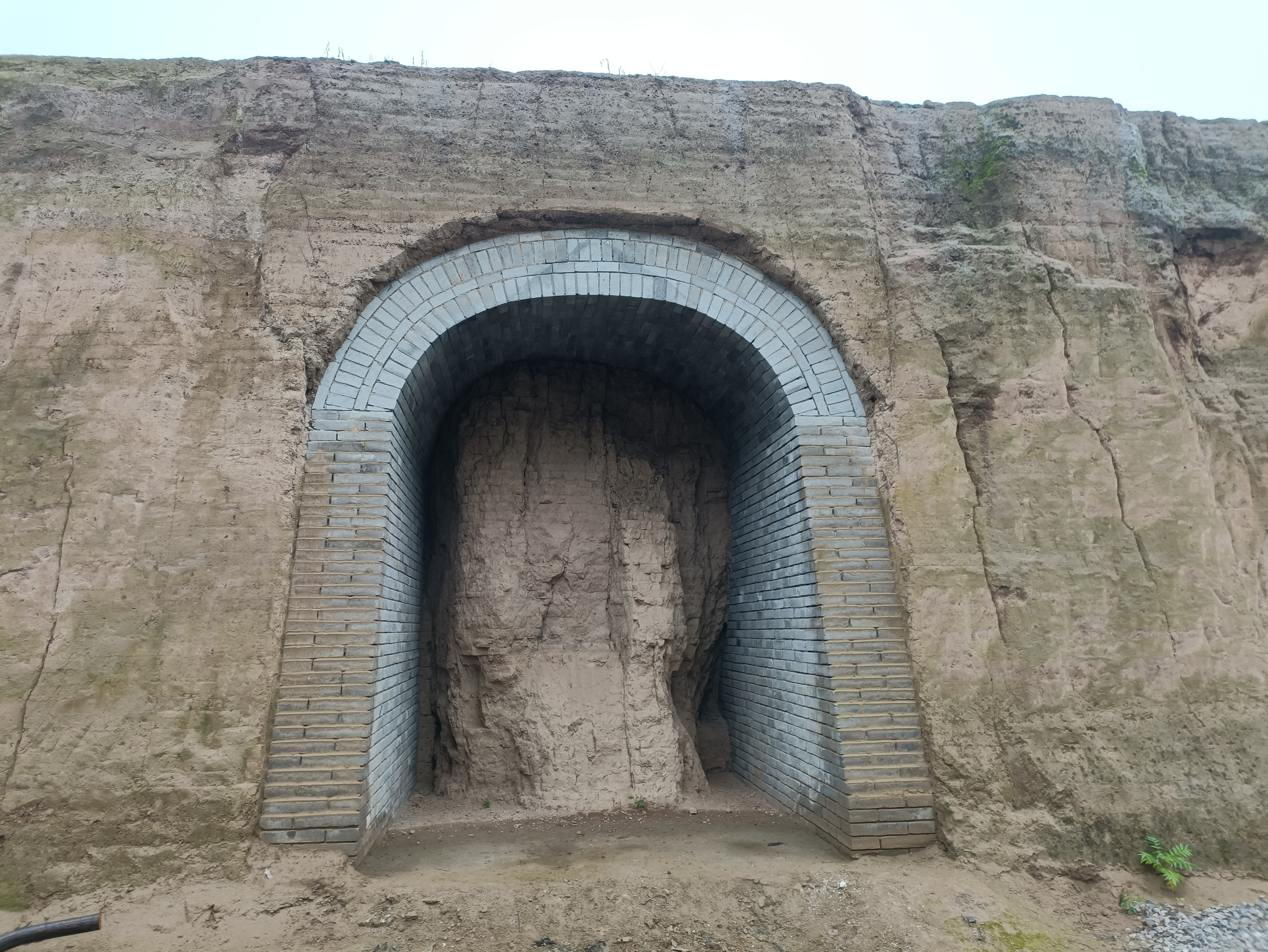
A palace gate

Remains of the Epang Palace, destroyed in 206 BC

The Qin ruled over territories roughly corresponding to the extent at the time of Chinese culture, as well as that of what would later be understood as the Han Chinese ethnic group. On the empire's frontiers were diverse groups with cultures foreign to the Qin; even areas under the control of the Qin military remained culturally distinct.

The Qin aristocracy were largely similar to the Zhou in culture and daily life, with regional variation generally considered a symbol of the lower classes – and ultimately as contrary to the unification that the government strove to achieve.

Commoners and rural villagers, who comprised more than 90% of the population, rarely left the villages or farmsteads where they were born. While various other forms of employment existed depending on the region, as with other settled peoples in antiquity the overwhelming majority of people throughout Qin were engaged predominately in agriculture. Other professions were hereditary; a father's employment was passed to his eldest son after he died. The Lüshi Chunqiu (c. 239 BC) – a text named for Lü Buwei, the prime minister who sponsored it – gave examples of how, when commoners are obsessed with material wealth, instead of the idealism of a man who "makes things serve him", they were "reduced to the service of things".

=== Agriculture ===
Qin agriculture was mainly based on cereal cultivation, with millet, wheat, and barley being the staple crops that comprised most of peasants' diets. The amount of land available for use as pasture was limited, with livestock raised mostly for household use of byproducts like milk. Consumption of meat was generally restricted to the wealthy. The state of Qin under Shang Yang pioneered a policy of maximising the area of land under cultivation, resulting in states clearing most of the forest in the Yellow River valley and converting it into farmland. This land was divided into household-sized allotments, and inhabitants were forcibly relocated to work them. Another emphasis of Shang Yang's agricultural policy was the use of hoes to weed the soil, which improved its ability to retain moisture and provide nutrients to crops.

=== Religion ===
The predominant form of religious belief in China during the early imperial period focused on shen (roughly meaning 'spirits'), yin (陰; 阴; 'shadows'), and the realm they were understood to inhabit. Spirits were classified as one of three types: 'human dead' (人鬼; rénguǐ), 'heavenly spirits' (天神; tiānshén) such as Shangdi, and 'earthly spirits' (地示; dìshì) corresponding to natural features like mountains and rivers. The spirit world was believed to be parallel to the earthly one: animal sacrifices were offered in order to make contact with it, and the spirits of people were thought to move there upon death. In general, ritual served two purposes: to receive blessings from the spirit realm, and to ensure the dead journeyed to and stayed there.

A ritual concept introduced under the Qin that would be continued by the Han was the official touring of ritual sites across the realm by the emperor, which served to reinforce notions of the emperor as a semi-divine figure.

The Qin also practised forms of divination – including that previously used by the Shang, where bones and turtle shells were heated in order to divine knowledge of the future from the cracks that formed. Observation of astronomical and weather phenomena were also common, with comets, eclipses, and droughts commonly considered omens.

== Government and military ==
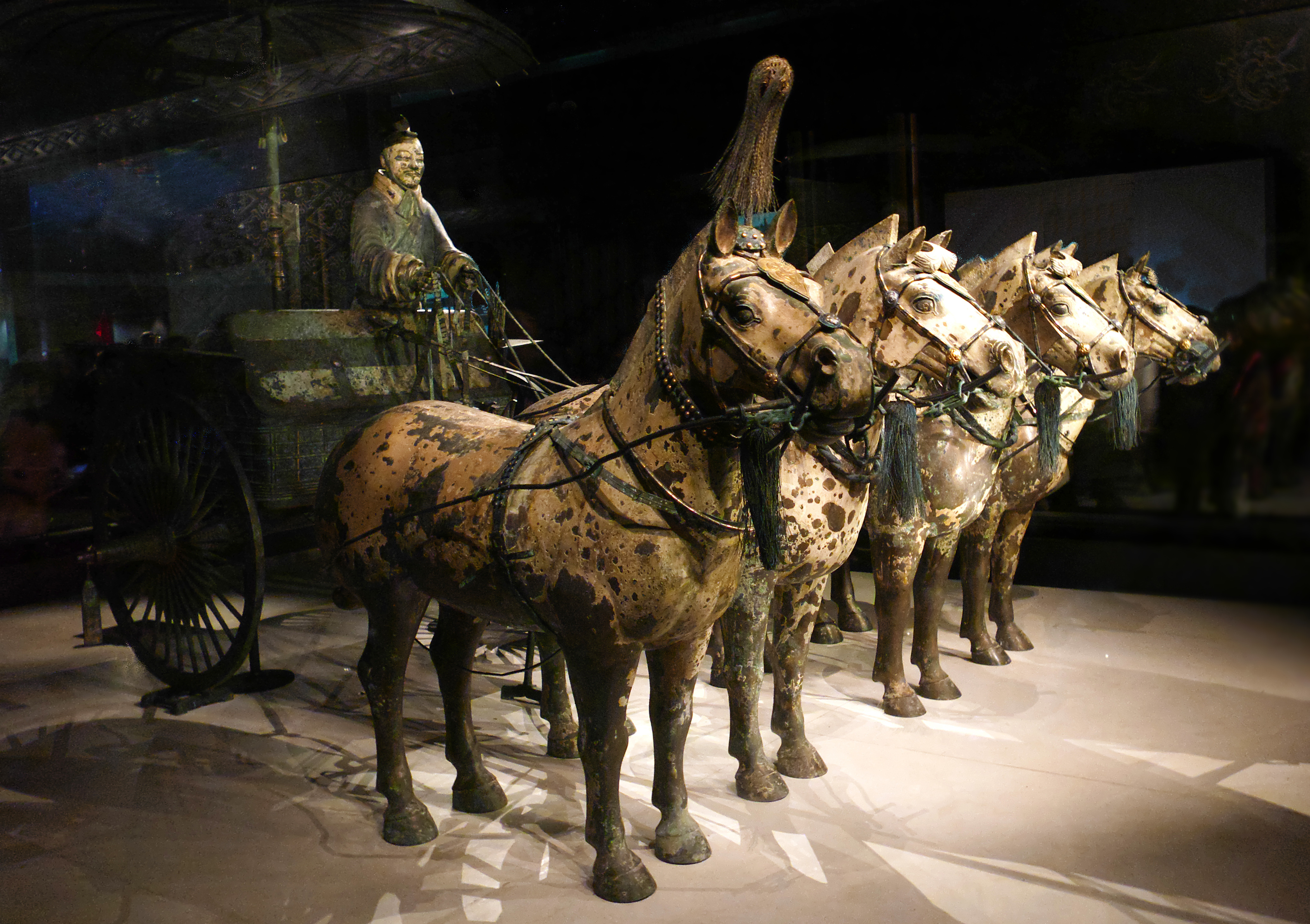
Terracotta Army at the Mausoleum of Qin Shi Huang museum

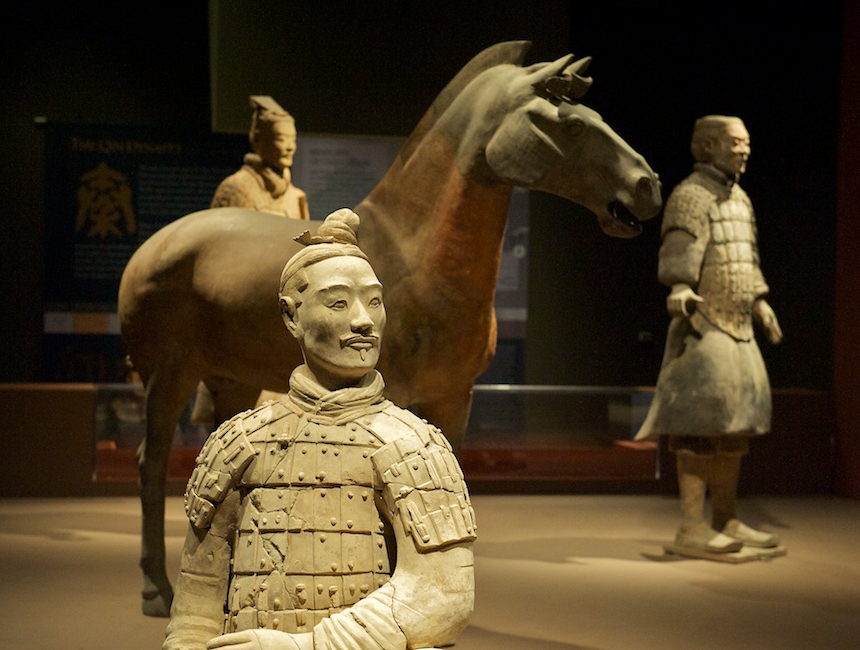
Warriors and horse from the Terracotta Army

The Qin government was highly bureaucratic, and was administered by a hierarchy of officials serving the emperor. The Qin put into practice the teachings of Han Fei, allowing the state to administer all of its territories, including those recently conquered. All aspects of life were standardised, from measurements and language to more practical details, such as the length of chariot axles.

The empire was divided into 36 commanderies, which were further subdivided into more than 1000 districts. The states made by the emperor were assigned to officials dedicated to the task rather than placing the burden on people from the royal family. Zheng and his advisors also introduced new laws and practices that ended aristocratic rule in China, fully replacing it with a centralised, bureaucratic government. A supervisory system, the Censorate was introduced to monitor and check the powers of administrators and officials at each level of government. The Qin instituted a permanent system of ranks and rewards, consisting of twenty ranks based on the number of enemies killed in battle or commanding victorious units. Ranks were not hereditary unless a soldier died heroically in battle, whereby the soldier's rank will be inherited by his family. Each rank was assigned a specific allotment of dwellings, slaves and land, and ranks could be used to remit judicial punishments.

Instances of abuse were recorded. In one example from the Records of Officialdom, a commander named Hu ordered his men to attack peasants in an attempt to increase the number of "bandits" he had killed; his superiors, likely eager to inflate their records as well, allowed this.

=== Economy ===
The Qin conception of political economy reflected the ideas of Shang Yang and Li Kui: labour was identified as the realm's primary resource, and commerce was understood in general to be "inherently sterile". The merchant class that had emerged during the Warring States period was considered a direct threat to the state, due to merchants' incentives to pursue individual profits and self-aggrandisement. After unification, the imperial state targeted their wealth and political power; a 214 BC law allowed for merchants to be impressed into the military and deported for service on the realm's frontiers. Reinforced by its distinct legal status, the merchant profession became increasingly hereditary in nature.

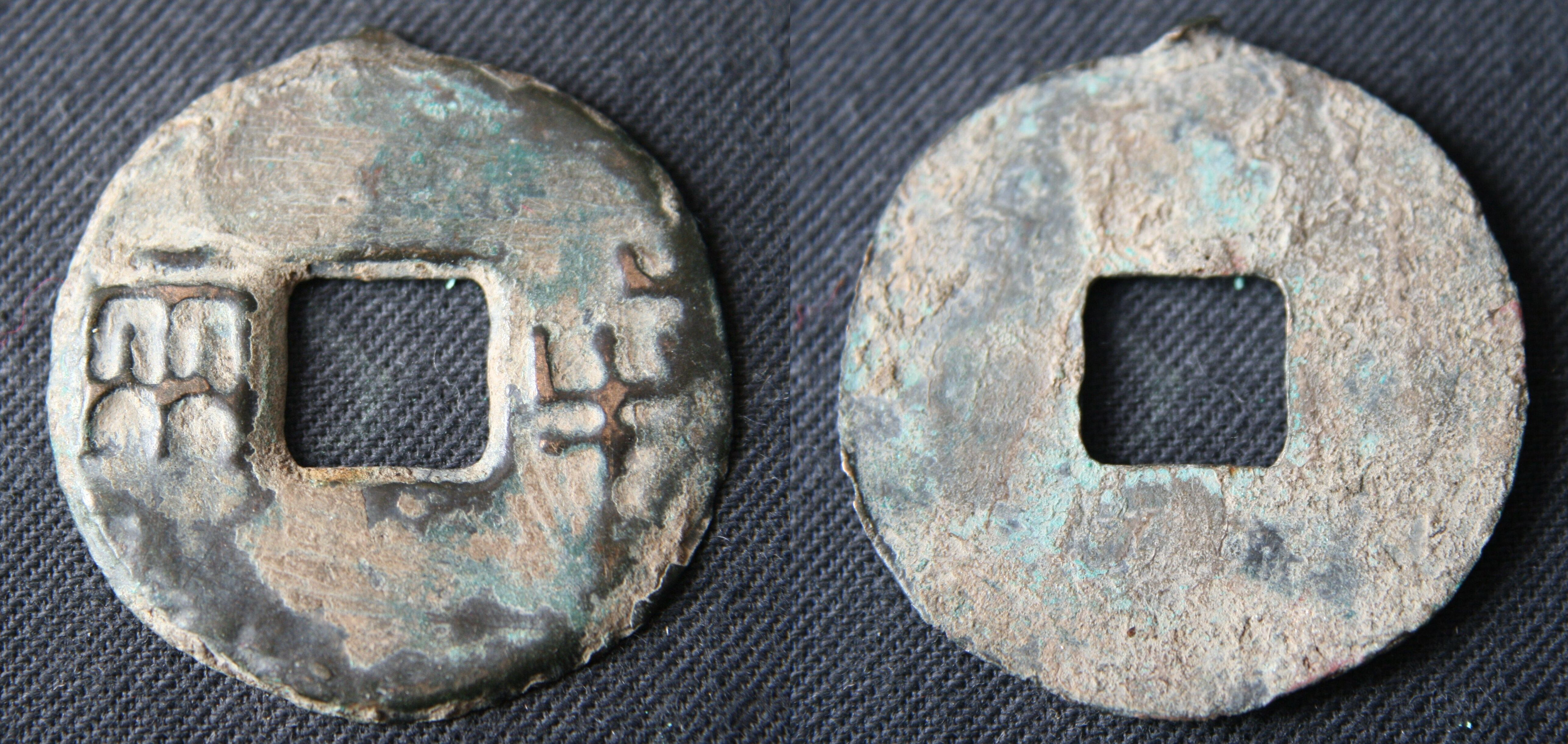
Qin-era banliang coin, with the obverse marked 半两 (bànliǎng)

During the 330s BC, the state of Qin began minting banliang coins, which were round, made mostly of bronze, and marked to indicate a nominal weight of around 8 g (5/16 oz) – though the actual weight varied in reality. After unification, banliang were given official status across the empire, replacing previous regional currencies like spade money and knife money to become the first standardised currency used throughout all of China. Unlike the Han, who initially continued the use of banliang, the Qin did not allow additional coins to be minted by the private sector, and considered those that were to be counterfeit.

=== Construction projects ===
Qin Shi Huang developed plans to fortify Qin's northern border, to protect against nomadic invasions. The resulting construction formed the base of what later became the Great Wall of China, which joined and strengthened the walls made by feudal lords. Another project built during his rule was the Terracotta Army, intended to protect the emperor after his death. The Terracotta Army was inconspicuous due to its underground location, and was not discovered until 1974.

=== Registration system ===
四境之內，丈夫女子皆有名於上
Everywhere within the borders, let all men and women be registered by name with the government

生者著，死者削
Those who are born shall be entered, and those who die, expunged

— The Book of Lord Shang

During the 4th century BC, the state of Qin introduced a registration system for its population, which initially collated the names of individuals, and later began keeping track of entire households. The system, unique in its scope among Qin's contemporaries, is thought to have been established in 375 BC. It was expanded later in the century at the direction of Shang Yang, with passages of The Book of Lord Shang referencing the system likely reflecting the words of Shang Yang himself. The oldest lists to be discovered, excavated at Shuihudi in Hubei and Liye in Hunan, date to the late 3rd century BC. Adapting a concept originally used within the military to society at-large, Qin households were organised into 'groups of five' (五; wǔ), wherein the heads of each household were made mutually responsible for reporting any wrongdoing committed by other members of the group. Under the orders of King Ying Zheng, the state began recording the ages of adult men in 231 BC.

=== Writing reform ===
"Qin" in seal script (top) and regular script (bottom) Chinese characters

The Zhou inherited the writing system of Chinese characters used by the preceding Shang dynasty (c. 1600 – c. 1056 BC) and first attested in oracle bone inscriptions c. 1250 BC. Writing was adopted throughout the Zhou cultural sphere during the first half of the 1st millennium BC, with the shapes and forms of characters in the script gradually evolving over time. With the Warring States period, distinct regional writing styles began to diverge from one another; compared to that of other Zhou states, the script used in Qin generally changed the least during this time.

The standard writing style in the state of Qin was consolidated under Qin Shi Huang into what is known as small seal script. Qin standardization aimed to allow faster writing by officials using brush and ink. It was spread throughout the Qin empire on public stone graphs, unifying in the empire different languages through the written language. With the establishment of the unified writing system, the Qin established an imperial academy and library with appointed scholars to interpret and control texts.

While the Book of Han (111 AD) states that Li Si distributed detailed instructions for writing in small seal script to scribes in 221 BC, these instructions have been lost. However, many contemporary inscriptions on monuments meant to demonstrate small seal character forms have survived. While the regional divergences across China were reduced considerably, the use of variant characters remained frequent among Qin scribes; the traditional idea of a strict standardisation of small seal script appears to be a later notion introduced by the Han.

=== Penal policy ===
Qin law was articulated alongside ritual practice. Writing itself was seen as part of ritual in Ancient China, with Confucius and Laozi portrayed as sages, ritual masters and archivists. The Shiji presents writing and ritual as still being connected during the Qin dynasty. The First Emperor erected stone stele invoking divine protection, which proclaim the establishment of the government, referring to the First Emperor as a sage. Their inscription was supervised by the court, influencing the Han and later dynasties. The Tang dynasty established a requirement for court approval of stele as a safeguard.

Qin law was primarily administrative. Like most ancient societies, the early imperial Chinese state did not have separate structures of administration and jurisprudence. Qin penal practice included concepts such as intent, defendant rights, judicial procedure, requests for retrials, and the distinction between common and statutory law. Comparative model manuals guided penal legal procedures based on real-life situations, with publicly named wrongs linked to punishments.

Shang Yang's code likely drew on Li Kui's Canon of Laws, which considered dealing with thieves and robbers the most urgent legal matter of its time. The Qin dynasty's penal code similarly focuses primarily on theft, though there were certain statutes dealing specifically with infanticide and other unsanctioned harm against children. However, almost all of the Book of Lord Shang was likely composed before Qin unification. Qin law diverged significantly from the time of Shang Yang, and earlier ideas espoused in the Book of Lord Shang.

Targeting unsanctioned punishment, the extremes of Qin law are arguably directed more against ministerial abuse. Showing up in cattle companies, the Qin dynasty did not completely eliminate group responsibility established by Shang Yang, but does not emphasize it either. Mutilating group punishment was directed against more extreme cases of group robbery by policing officials themselves. Smaller administrative crimes only received fines or reprimands, while petty theft committed by individual commoners was punished with a month's labour service.

Anti-Confucianistic sentiments in the Book of Lord Shang are isolated to a few early chapters. While retaining Shang Yang's reforms, the Qin abandoned his anti-Confucianism, his strict, harsh penal policy, and ultimately his heavy emphasis on agriculture. After Shang Yang, the Lushi Chunqiu attests King Huiwen of Qin as having pardoned the death penalty in a case involving murder, based on Confucianistic ethics. Though the work does not endorse simply adopting Confucius, or other major figures, the Qin practice of pardon is at least relatable to that of redemption in the Analects of Confucius, aiming to reduce punishment to a minimum by attempting to ensure a correct application of the rectification of names.

While The Book of Lord Shang earlier recommended harsh punishment, it also "laments" insufficient population for its territories, and the Qin attempted to limit emigration out of the country. In addition to a trend against harsh punishment, the cost of accommodating too much mobile convict labour was moreover "potentially ruinous". Hence, punishment often went unenforced, with criminals sometimes given amnesties, only incurring punishment upon recidivism, and were often pardoned in exchange for fines, labour, or a demotion in aristocratic rank, even for capital offenses, frequently resettling criminals in frontier colonies. Those sentenced to hard labour were sometimes sent to join frontier defences if given amnesty. Men in the colonies sentenced to death were then recruited for expeditionary armies.

Still including mutilating punishments, Qin law would generally be considered harsh by modern standards, though they were "not extraordinarily severe for their time". With mutilation not the most common heavy punishment, and tattooing considered already a heavy mutilating punishment, tattooing was the most common heavy mutilating punishment. Recovered Qin legal practice only mentioned cases of nose or foot cutting a few times. Infrequent capital punishment targeted taboos of incest or temple destruction.

With farmers only otherwise available for a month at a time during off-seasons, and aiming to the avoid the agricultural instability that using corvée would have caused, hard labour became the most common heavy punishment. Though the projects were well planned, the lives of those finally so sentenced were not viewed as valuable as peasants, so that many still died from hard labour. Those sentenced to hard labour generally performed public works inside the country, mainly in road and canal construction. Only a minority were sent to build the great wall.

The Han-era writer Dong Zhongshu (179–104 BC) considered Qin officials and taxes severe, but did not characterise punishments as such; in fact, Dong criticised the Qin system for its inability to punish criminals; though exile as a heavy punishment in China dates to at least the Spring and Autumn period.

== Legacy ==
The Qin, despite existing for only 14 years, are credited with inaugurating the Chinese imperial system, which would persist in some form throughout Chinese history until it was ultimately overthrown by the Xinhai Revolution in 1911.

During the 2nd and 1st centuries BC, Han dynasty scholars began portraying the Qin as a monolithic, legalist tyranny, often invoked as an example of bad governance in contemporary debates about imperial policy. In particular, purges in 213 and 212 BC collectively known as the burning of books and burying of scholars are frequently cited to this end; however, the earliest account of these events is contained in the Shiji (c. 91 BC), and its veracity is disputed by some modern scholars. The Qin were deliberately contrasted with what was characterised as the virtuous rule of the Han. However, the Han essentially inherited the administrative state built by the Qin, including the household registration system. Owing to this continuity, medieval and modern historians have often grouped the Qin and Han together, with the establishment of the Han treated "mainly as a change in ruling houses rather than a system or method of rule".

=== Etymology of China ===
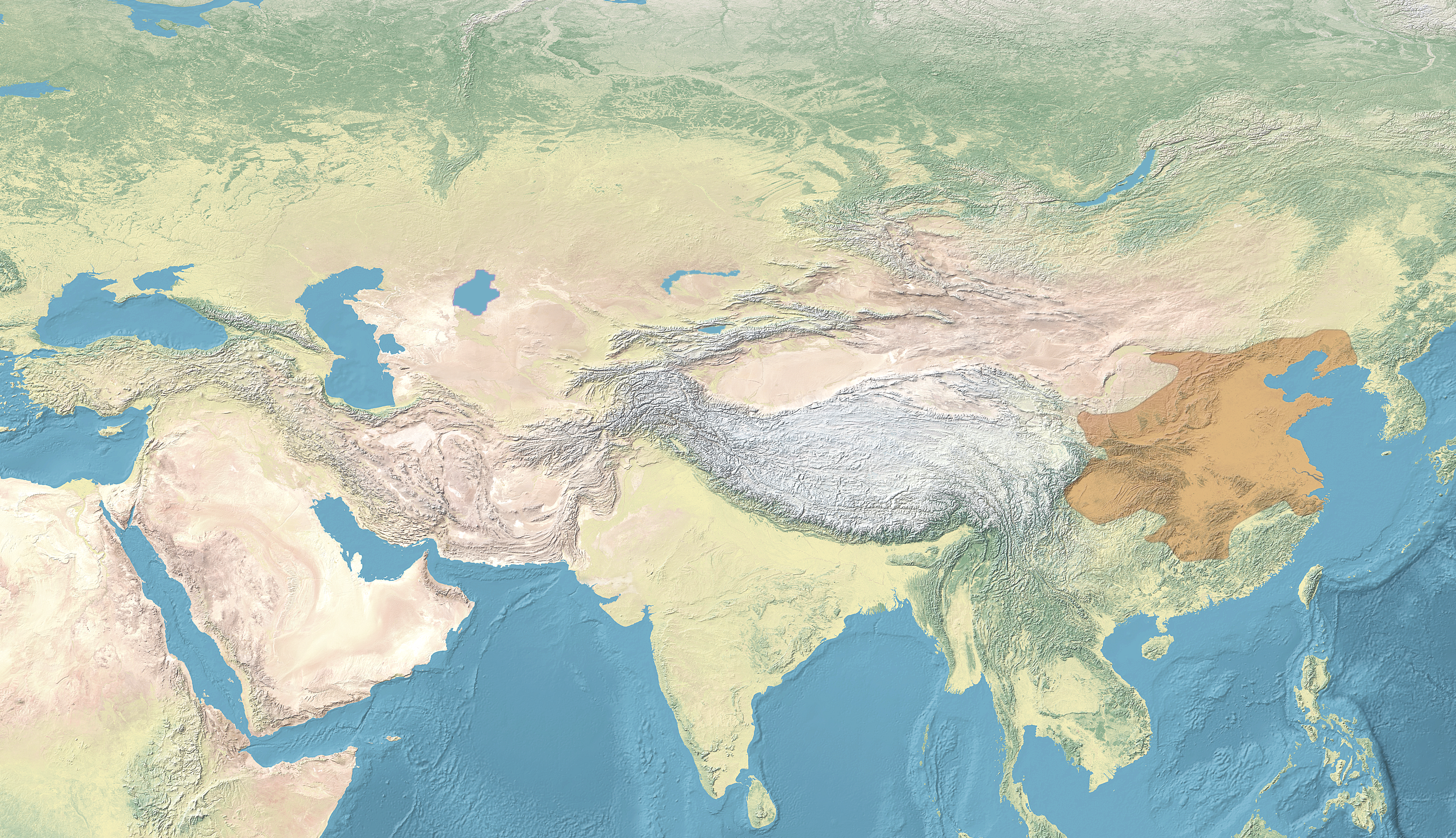
Qin alongside the other major polities of Asia in 221 BC, with the capital Xianyang marked with a red dot

Qin is the likeliest origin for the modern name China and its equivalents in many European languages. The term likely first appeared in the Indo-Aryan languages, attested in Sanskrit as both Cina and Sina, and subsequently entered Greek as Thinai or Sinai. From there it entered the vernacular languages of Europe, e.g. as China in English and Chine in French. This etymology is questioned by some scholars, who suggest that Sina appears in Sanskrit centuries before the Qin dynasty's founding. Other hypothesised origins include the Zhou-era state of Jin that existed prior to the 4th century BC, and Jing (荆), another name for the state of Chu.

== Sovereigns ==
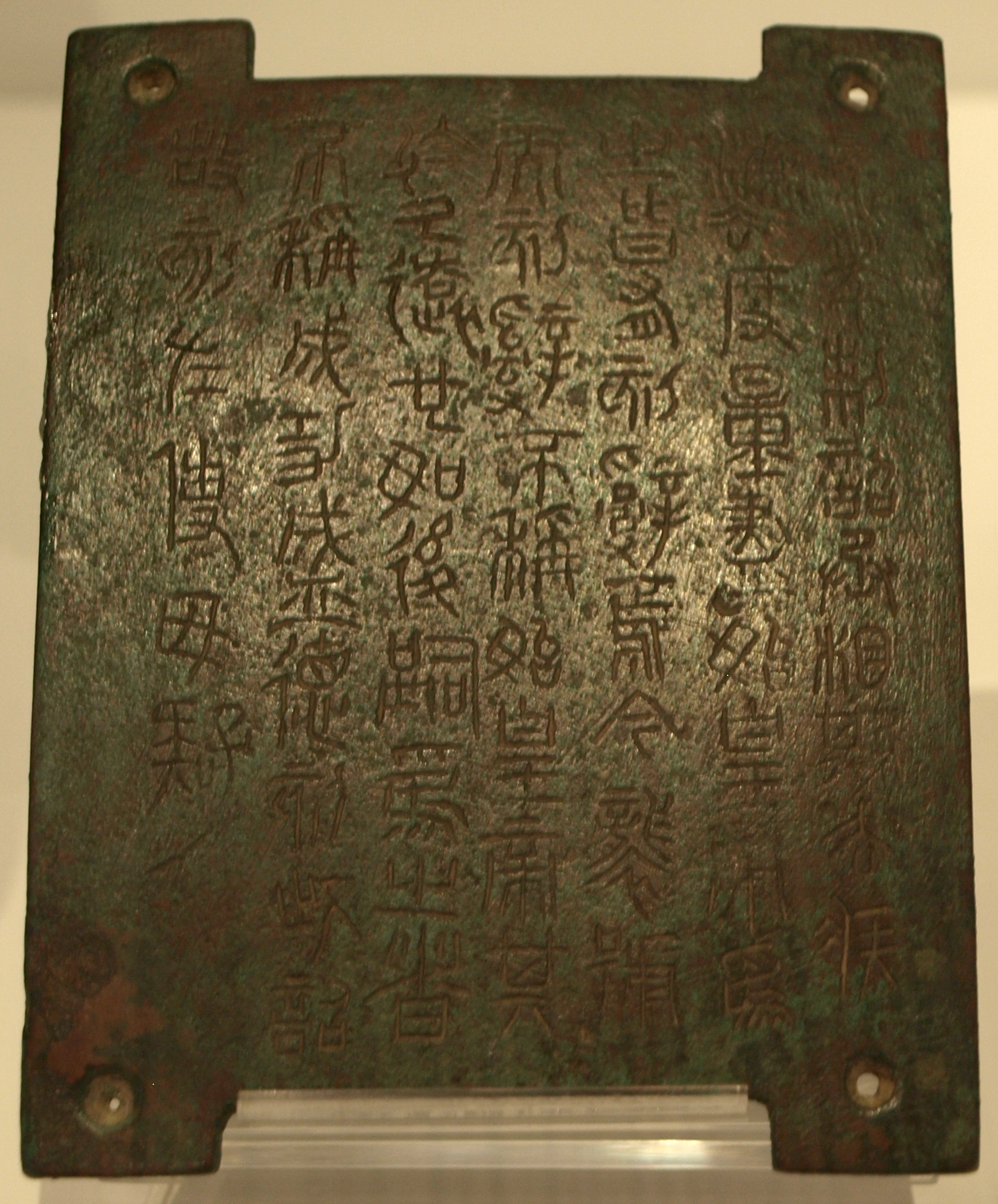
An edict in bronze from the reign of Qin Er Shi

No.	Posthumous name	Personal name	Reign
1	Shi Huangdi	Zheng (政)	221–210 BC
2	Er Shi Huangdi	Huhai (胡亥)	210–207 BC
3	—	Ziying (子嬰)	207 BC

=== Imperial family tree ===
Qin dynasty

See Family tree of Qin
Zheng 政 259–210 BC King of Qin 秦王 r. 247–221 BC Qin Shi Huang 秦始皇 r. 221–210 BC
1	18 or 25 (disputed)
Fusu 扶蘇 d. 210 BC	Huhai 胡亥; 229–207 BC Qin Er Shi 秦二世 r. 210–207 BC
Ziying 子嬰 d. 206 BC King of Qin r. 207 BC

== Notes ==
Preceded by Zhou dynasty	Dynasties in Chinese history 221–207 BC	Succeeded by Han dynasty
