= Hukou (disambiguation) =

Hukou is a system of household registration used in mainland China. It may also refer to:

== Places ==
=== China ===
- Hukou Waterfall (壶口瀑布), the largest waterfall on the Yellow River, at the border of Shanxi and Shaanxi
- Hukou County (湖口县), a county in Jiangxi, China
- Hukou, Chaling (湖口), a town in Chaling County, Hunan, China. It is at the mouth of Poyang Lake, where water flows into the Yangtze River.
- Hukou, Guangdong (湖口), a town in Nanxiong, Guangdong, China
- Hukou, Shanxi (壶口), a town in Ji County, Shanxi, China, on one side of the Waterfall
- Hukou Township, Shaanxi (壶口乡), a town in Yichuan County, Shaanxi, China, on the other side of the Waterfall

=== Taiwan ===
- Hukou, Hsinchu (湖口鄉), a township of Hsinchu County, Taiwan

== See also ==
- Hukou station (disambiguation)
- Penghou, a Chinese tree spirit called Hōkō or Houkou in Japanese
