= Majiang =

Majiang may refer to:

- Majiang County (麻江), Qiandongnan Prefecture, Guizhou, China
- Majiang, Zhaoping County (马江镇), town in Guangxi, China
- Majiang, Chaling (马江镇), town in Chaling County, Hunan, China
- Majiang, Shuangpai (麻江镇), a town Shuangpai County, Hunan
- Mahjong (麻将), a game which is popular in east Asia, especially in Mainland China
- Sesame paste (麻酱), shortening of 芝麻酱; see Tahini
