= Huju =

Huju may refer to:

- Shanghai opera, a Chinese opera genre from Shanghai, also known as Huju
- Huzhou opera, a Chinese opera genre from Huzhou (a city not far from Shanghai), also known as Huju
- Huju, Hunan, a town in Chaling County, Hunan, China
- Huju Chongnyon Station, formerly known as Huju Station, a railway station in Kimhyongjik County, Ryanggang Province, North Korea
