= Yunyang =

Yunyang may refer to several places in China:

- Yunyang, Shiyan, Hubei
- Yunyang County, Chongqing
- Yunyang Subdistrict, Chaling County, Hunan
