= Chu script =

Ancient Chinese writing system

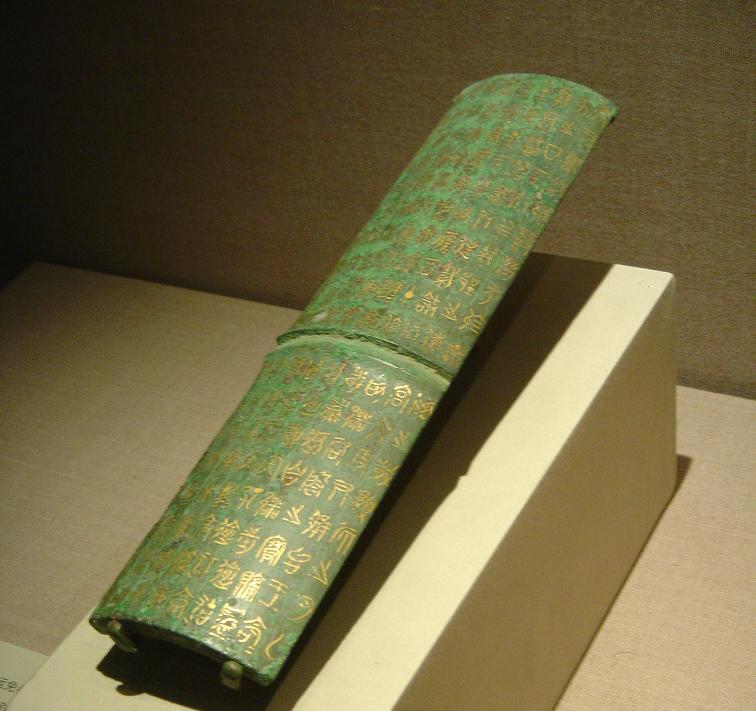
Bronze vessel with Chu script, "Ejun Qijinjie"

The Chu or Chu script is a writing system used in the state of Chu during the Spring and Autumn and Warring States periods. The script was one of the different ancient writing systems used by various countries in China prior to the unification of the empire by Emperor Qin Shi Huang and the implementation of the policy of writing in the same script. It is also known as the “Chu System of Simplified Palm Script” because most of the excavated texts are on silk, in addition to bamboo and wooden slips.

== Characteristics ==
The Chu script was one of the six scripts used by the six Shandong states (Qi, Chu, Yan, Han, Wei, and Zhao), and was widely used during the Spring and Autumn and Warring States periods of ancient China, but was banned after the Qin state annexed the six states and standardized the scripts, and then its use was drastically reduced and ultimately died out.

Since the 1950s, there have been a number of artifacts written in pre-Qin and early Qin-Han scripts on silk and silk unearthed in various places, including the “Wulipai Bamboo Kan” from the Chu Tomb in Changsha, the “Wangshan Bamboo Kan” from the Wangshan Chu Tomb in Jiangling, the “Xinyang Bamboo Kan” from the Chu Tomb at Changtaiguan in Xinyang, Henan, the Palm Script unearthed from the Han Tomb of Mawangdui in 1973, and the “Yumeng Nyinghudi Qin Kan” unearthed from the Qin Tomb in 1975. The scripts in these texts are in the process of transition between seal script and clerical script. Therefore, it is extremely difficult to interpret them accurately.

One example of the difficulties in interpretation is the character “虎”, whose form is difficult to relate imaginatively to the concept of “tiger”, and which in certain contexts actually means “吾”, both in terms of the change in the character form and the way “虎” is written as the first person “吾”. Both the change of character form and the way the character “tiger” is written as the first person “吾” indicate that the ancient scripts were used very differently from today's. At the same time, the scripts were similar to those of today. At the same time, scripts and usages similar to today's are not uncommon, and the Shaanxi Provincial Bureau of Cultural Relics describes on its official website the similarities and differences in the relationship between the Chu script “馬” which is much the same as the modern script “馬”.

The unearthed jiandu are presumed to record a number of texts and books that have been lost in ancient times, and deciphering and research is ongoing.

== See also ==
- Mawangdui Han Tomb - Han tombs excavated after 1972 whose artifacts are exhibited in the same museum.
