= Batuan =

Batuan may refer to:

== Places ==
- Batuan, Bali, a village in Indonesia famous for paintings
- Batuan, Bohol, a municipality in Bohol province, Philippines
- Batuan, Masbate, a municipality in Masbate province, Philippines
- Batuan, Juban, an inactive volcano in Juban municipality, Philippines
- Batuan, Chaling, a township in Chaling County, Hunan, China

== Other uses ==
- Garcinia binucao, a plant species also known as batuan or binukaw

== See also ==
- Butuan, a city in the region of Caraga, Philippines
