= Lushui, Chaling =

Lushui Town 潞水镇
- Town
- Location in Hunan
- Coordinates: 26°57′39″N 113°33′22″E
- Country: People's Republic of China
- Province: Hunan
- Prefecture-level city: Zhuzhou
- County: Chaling

Area
  - Total: 127 km^{2} (49 sq mi)

Population
  - Total: 32,000
  - Density: 250/km^{2} (650/sq mi)
- Time zone: UTC+8 (China Standard)
- Area code: 0733

Lushui (Chinese: 潞水镇; pinyin: Lùshuǐ Zhèn) is a historic town located in the north of Chaling County, Hunan, China.

As a historic division of Chaling, Lushui Commune (潞水公社) was created in 1961 from a part of Dongfeng Commune (东风公社). The commune was reorganized as a township in 1984, then the township was reorganized as a town in 1992.

Lushui Town was dissolved on November 20, 2015, nine villages of the town were amalgamated to Yaolu Town (腰潞镇), the other 3 villages were merged to Sicong Subdistrict (思聪街道).

== Subdivisions ==
The town is divided into 12 villages and 1 community, which include the following areas: Lushui Community, Datai Village, Nongyuan Village, Shoutuan Village, Tiantu Village, Xiafang Village, Yuanwang Village, Dayuan Village, Shuangguan Village, Jieshi Village, Longxi Village, Miaoshi Village, and Miaoping Village.
