= Xin Zhui =

Well-preserved ancient body found in China

- Marchioness of Dai
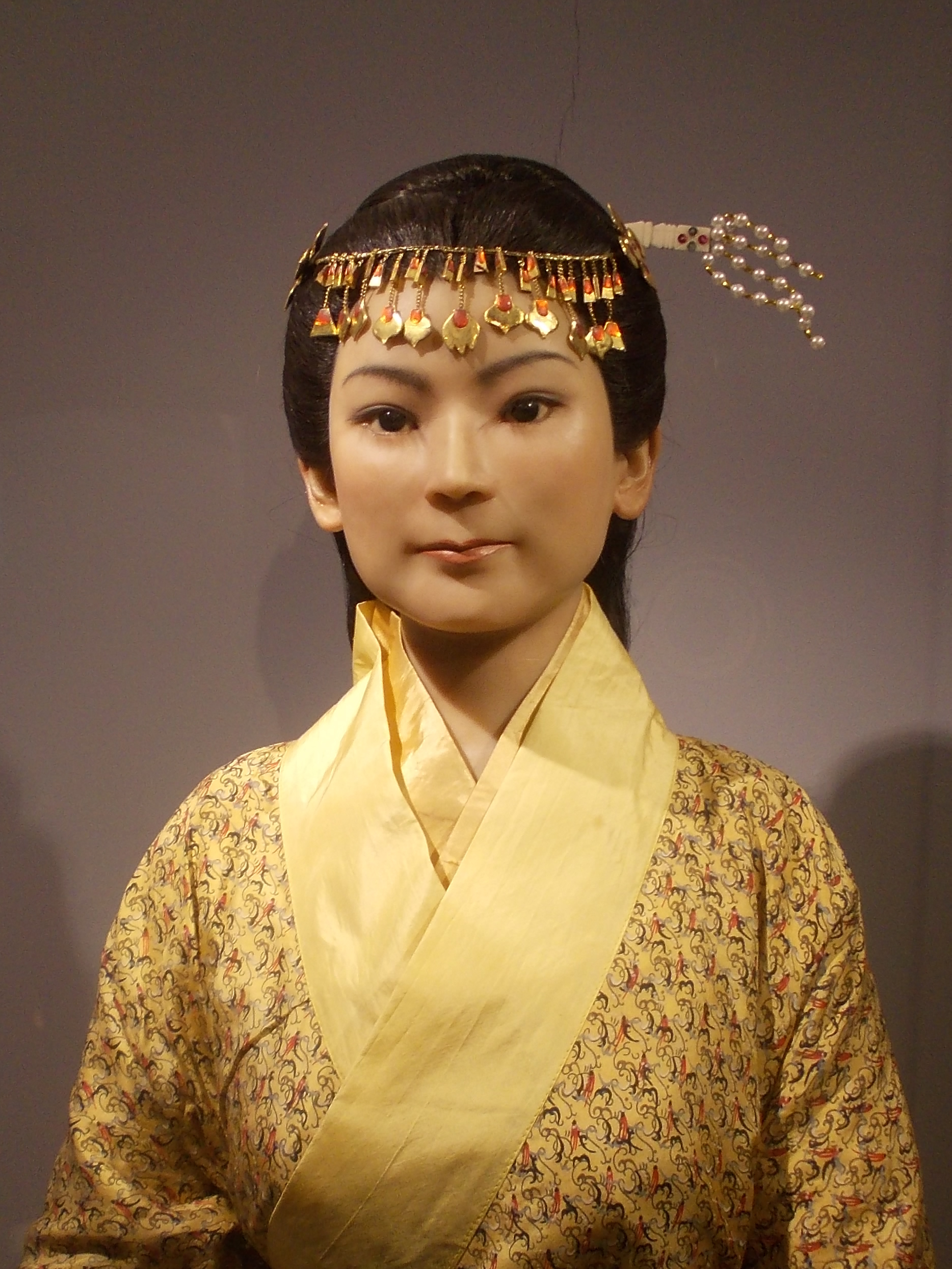
- A wax sculpture reconstruction of Xin Zhui
- Dynasty: Han
- Born: c. 217 BC
- Died: 169 or 168 BC (aged 48–49)
- Buried: Mawangdui, Changsha, Hunan Province, China
- Husband: Li Cang (利蒼), Marquis of Dai

Xin Zhui
- Chinese: 辛追
Transcriptions
Standard Mandarin
- Hanyu Pinyin: Xīn Zhuī
- IPA: [ɕín ʈʂwéɪ]
Yue: Cantonese
- Yale Romanization: Sān Jēui
- Jyutping: San^{1} Zeoi^{1}
- IPA: [sɐn˥ tsɵɥ˥]
Southern Min
- Hokkien POJ: Sin Tui

Xin Zhui (Chinese: 辛追; [ɕín ʈʂwéɪ]; c. 217 BC – 169 or 168 BC), also known as Lady Dai or the Marchioness of Dai, was a Chinese noblewoman. She was the wife of Li Cang (利蒼), (Note: Li's name was recorded as "利仓" (same pronunciation) in Records of the Grand Historian and as "Li Zhucang" (黎朱苍) in Book of Han.) the Marquis of Dai (軑) and chancellor of the Changsha Kingdom, during the Western Han dynasty. Her tomb, containing her well-preserved remains and 1,400 artifacts, was discovered in 1971 at Mawangdui, Changsha. Her body and belongings are currently under the care of the Hunan Museum; artifacts from her tomb were displayed in Santa Barbara and New York City in 2009. Her body is notable as being one of the best-preserved mummies ever found.

== Life ==
Xin Zhui is thought to have lived a wealthy lifestyle. She had private musicians for entertainment who would play for her parties as well as for her personal amusement. She may have enjoyed playing music as well, particularly the guqin, which was traditionally associated with refinement and intellect. (Note: Although traditional literature associates the playing of the qin as being a masculine activity, contemporary paintings and other artifacts strongly suggest that women enjoyed playing the instrument as well.) As a noble, Xin Zhui also had access to a variety of imperial foods, including various types of meat, which were reserved for the royal family and members of the ruling class. Most of her clothing was made of silk and other valuable textiles, and she owned many cosmetics.

As she aged, Xin Zhui suffered from many ailments that eventually led to a heart attack that caused her death. Along with schistosomiasis, a parasitic infection, she also had coronary thrombosis and arteriosclerosis, most likely linked to excessive weight gained due to a sedentary lifestyle, diabetes, angina pectoris, liver disease, and hypertension. Lumbago and a compressed spinal disc probably caused her immense pain, which contributed to a decrease in physical activity. She also suffered from gallstones, one of which lodged in her bile duct and further deteriorated her condition. Her arteries were found to be heavily congested, leading to congestive heart failure.

A total of 130 melon seeds were found in Xin Zhui's stomach, intestines, and esophagus; researchers believed she consumed the melon very quickly. From this, researchers inferred that she died in summer, when fruits and melons ripen. The presence of melon seeds in her stomach also indicates that she died within two to three hours of eating the fruit.

Xin Zhui died at approximately 50 years of age in 169 or 168 BC.

== Discovery ==
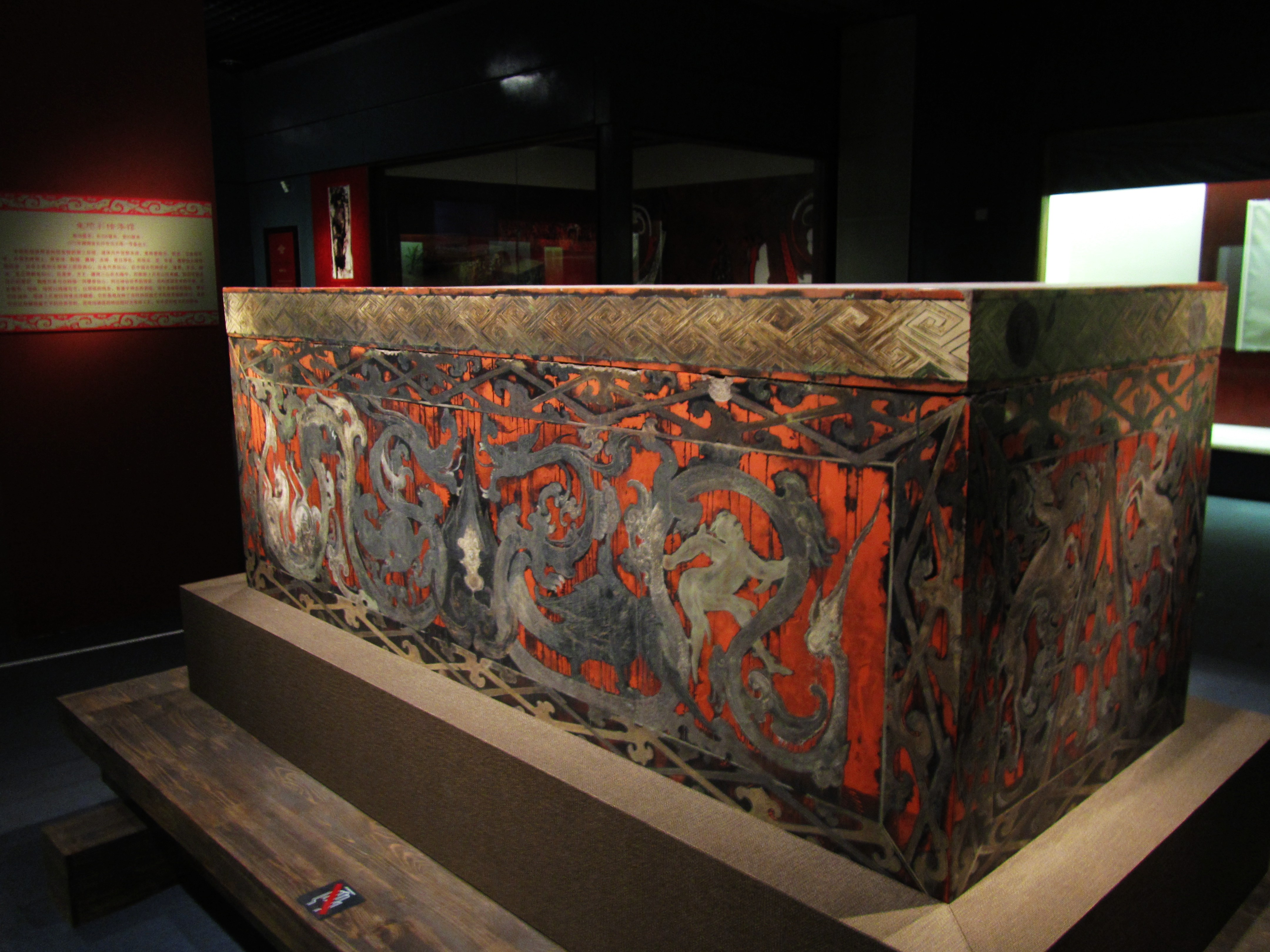
The lacquered coffin of Xin Zhui. From Tomb No. 1 at Mawangdui, 2nd century BC

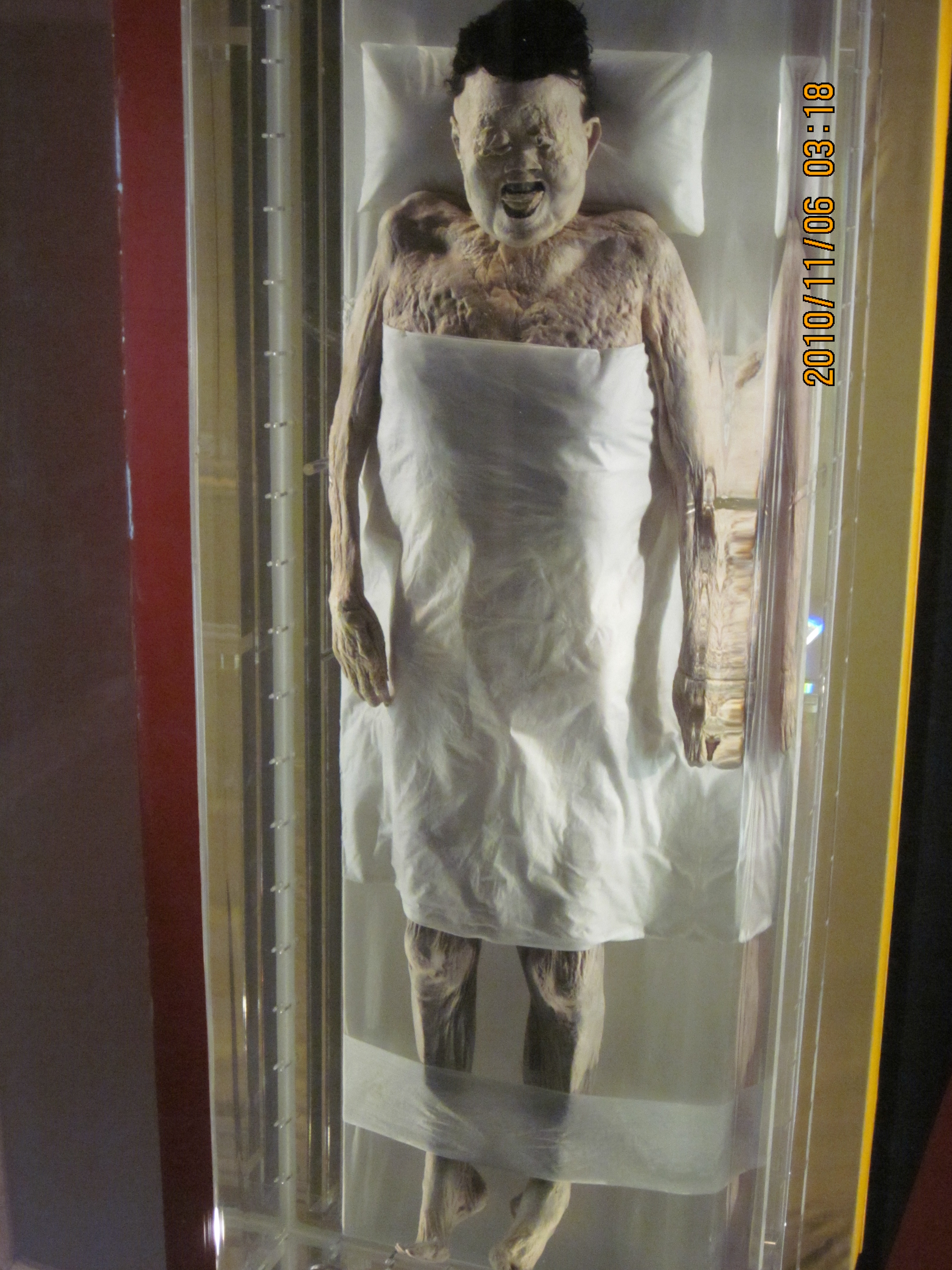
The preserved body of Xin Zhui

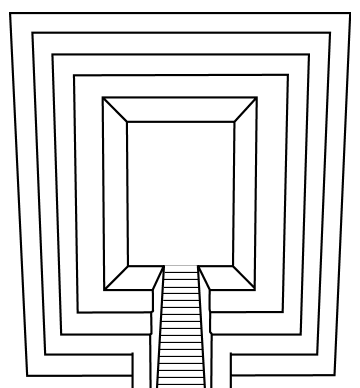
Diagram of tomb no. 1, where Xin Zhui's body was found

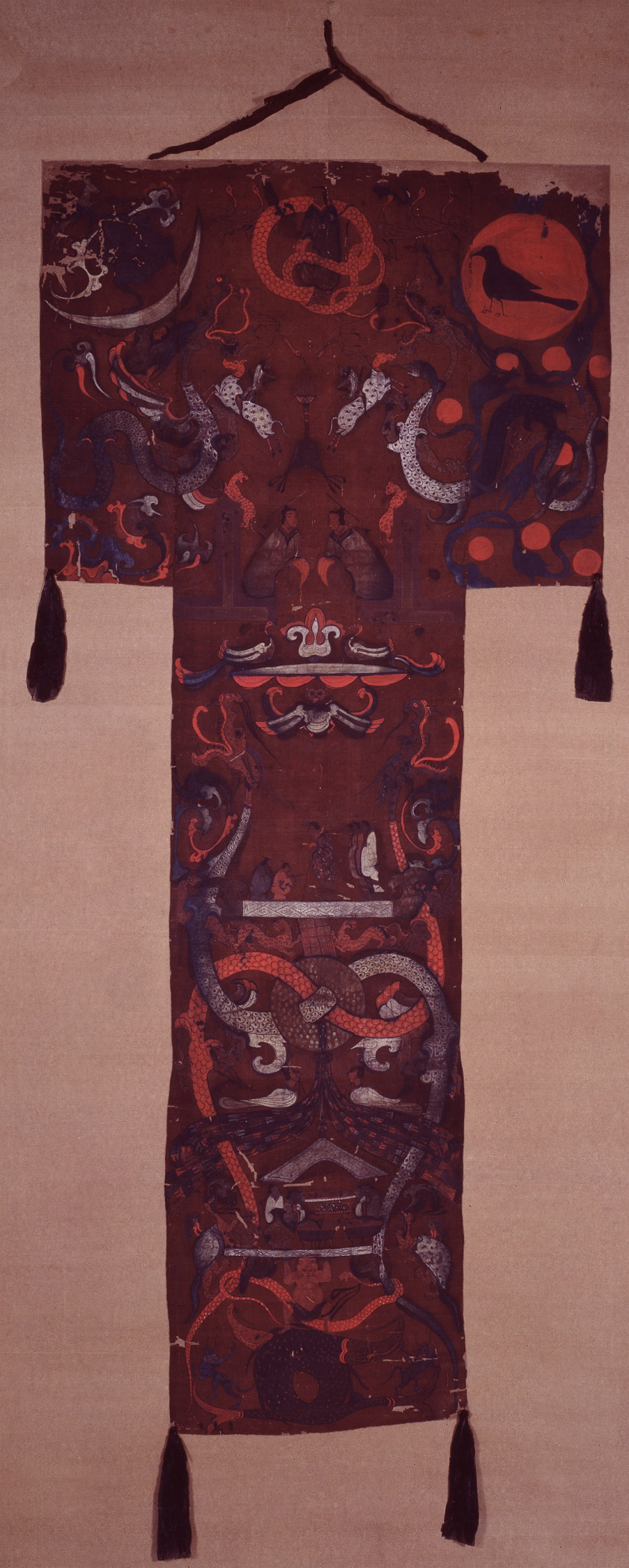
Western Han painted silk found draped over the coffin of Xin Zhui, it depicts the heaven (upper part), the human realm (middle part), and the netherworld (bottom part)

In 1968, workers digging an air raid shelter for a hospital near Changsha unearthed the tomb of Xin Zhui, as well as the tombs of her husband and a young man who is most commonly thought to be her son. With the assistance of over 1,500 local high school students, archaeologists began a large excavation of the site beginning in January 1972. Xin Zhui's body was found within four rectangular pine constructs that sat inside one another which were buried beneath layers of charcoal and white clay. The corpse was wrapped in twenty layers of clothing bound with silk ribbons.

In the tomb of Xin Zhui, four coffins of decreasing sizes enclose one another. The first and outermost coffin is painted black, the color of death and the underworld. All painted images sealed inside this coffin were thus designed not for an outside viewer but for the deceased and concern the themes of death and rebirth, protection in the afterlife, and immortality. The second coffin has a black background but is painted with a pattern of stylized clouds and with protective deities and auspicious animals roaming an empty universe. A tiny figure, the deceased woman, is emerging at the bottom center of the head end. Only her upper body is shown, indicating she is about to enter a new world. The third coffin exhibits a different color scheme and iconography. It is shining red, the color of immortality, and the decorative motifs include divine animals and a winged immortal flanking three-peaked Mount Kunlun, which is a prime symbol of eternal happiness. Inside this tomb on top of the fourth and innermost coffin, the excavators found a painted silk banner about two meters long.

Yellow and black feathers are stuck on the cover board of the coffin. The feathers stuck to the coffin were expressing the hopes that Xin Zhui would grow feathers on the body and enter the heavens to become immortal.

Xin Zhui's body was remarkably well preserved. Her skin was soft and moist, with muscles that still allowed for her arms and legs to flex at the joints. All her organs and blood vessels were also intact, with small amounts of Type A blood being found in her veins. There was hair on her head, with a wig pinned with a hair clasp on the back of her head. There was skin on her face, and her eyelashes and nose hair remained intact. The tympanic membrane of her left ear was also intact, and her finger and toe prints were distinct. This preservation allowed doctors at Hunan Provincial Medical Institute to perform an autopsy on 14 December 1972. Much of what is known about Xin Zhui's lifestyle was derived from this and other examinations. As a member of the nobility, her body would have been washed with fragrant water and wine, which has antibacterial properties.

In the Western Han dynasty, elaborate and lavish burials were common practice; it was believed that another world, or afterlife, existed for the dead, and they needed food and accommodation just like the living. Therefore, these necessities in life should be brought into the grave for use in the afterlife. The coffin contained over 150 types of food and drink in total, including grains, vegetables, meats, pastries, and wine. The importance of filial piety during that time also resulted in a lavish burial with many artifacts. More than 1,400 precious artifacts were found with Xin Zhui's body including a wardrobe containing 100 silk garments, 182 pieces of expensive lacquerware, makeup and toiletries, ornate burial banners, medicinal products, and 162 carved wooden figurines representing servants and musicians.

=== Fluid ===
The fluid present in the coffin allowed Xin Zhui's body to remain in such well-preserved condition. The mysterious liquid she was soaked in was acidic, which may have worked to preserve the body by preventing bacteria from growing. Tests revealed it to also contain salt and magnesium. Many scientists believe that the fluid stemmed from the body, rather than liquid poured into the coffin. When the autopsy on Xin Zhui's remains was done, contact with the fluid caused a rash on the hands of the scientists conducting it. The rash persisted on their skin for three months.

=== Preservation ===
Scientists believe that three major factors helped preserve her body. First was the careful preparation of the body for burial, which slowed the early stage of decomposition. Second, the body was placed in an airtight set of coffins. Lastly, the burial chamber was positioned deep underground, surrounded by charcoal and white clay. Water and air did not leak in and the temperature stayed constantly cool. However, scientists do not know for certain what combination of factors helped preserve Xin Zhui's corpse, or why almost the same conditions failed to preserve other bodies.

Other "Mawangdui-Type" cadavers in similar conditions have been found in China. Two from the same time period as Xin Zhui; they belong to a male official named Sui Xiaoyuan found in Jingzhou and a noblewoman named Ling Huiping found in Lianyungang. No consistent pattern explained why their bodies were preserved. All three had coffins containing liquid. However, Lady Dai's was acidic, whereas others' were alkaline, which would have aided bacterial growth. The tombs were also dug to different depths, from 5 metres (16 feet) to 16 metres (52 feet) and contained differing amounts of charcoal and white clay. In addition, similar airtight and watertight coffins failed to keep other cadavers from decomposing into skeletons or dust.

The body of Wu Rui, who was King of Changsha in the time of Xin Zhui's youth, was reported to be in a perfect condition when it was dug out four centuries later. According to legend, a man who took part in the grave robbery on the orders of Sun Quan later remarked to an officer that the latter closely resembled Wu Rui in appearance, but a bit shorter. The astonished officer then confirmed that he was indeed a descendant of the Changsha royal family.

== Significance ==
Besides having some of the best preserved human remains ever discovered in China, the contents of Xin Zhui's tomb revealed much information about life in the Han dynasty that was previously unknown. The discovery continues to advance the fields of archaeology and science in the 21st century, particularly in the area of preservation of ancient human remains. Scientists in 2003 developed a "secret compound" that was injected into Xin Zhui's still existing blood vessels to assure her preservation.

Her funerary banner had Han dynasty religious art motifs on it. The woman on the top is possibly Xin Zhui herself drawn in imitation of Nüwa or the snake-like spirits next to her who could have been inspired by Nüwa, in the process of becoming a xian.

== See also ==
- Mawangdui Silk Texts
