= Yaopi, Chaling =

Yaopi Town 腰陂镇
- Town
- Location in Hunan
- Coordinates: 26°53′00″N 113°38′27″E
- Country: People's Republic of China
- Province: Hunan
- Prefecture-level city: Zhuzhou
- County: Chaling

Area
  - Total: 230 km^{2} (89 sq mi)

Population
  - Total: 57,600
  - Density: 250/km^{2} (650/sq mi)
- Time zone: UTC+8 (China Standard)
- Area code: 0733

Yaopi (Chinese: 腰陂镇; pinyin: Yāopí Zhèn) is a former town in the middle east of Chaling County, Hunan, China.

As a historical division of Chaling, Yaopi Commune (腰陂公社) was created in 1961 from a part of Dongfeng Commune (东风公社). The commune was reorganized as a township in 1984, the township was reorganized as a town in 1990. In February 2007, Qidi Township (七地乡) and Hengwu Village (横屋村) of the historic Yaoshui Township (尧水乡) were merged to Yaopi Town.

Yaopi Town was dissolved on November 20, 2015, while 24 villages and a community of the town were amalgamated to Yaolu Town (腰潞镇). The other three villages were merged to Mijiang Subdistrict (洣江街道).
