= Gaolong, Chaling =

Gaolong Town 高陇镇
- Town
- Location in Hunan
- Coordinates: 26°57′02″N 113°47′08″E
- Country: People's Republic of China
- Province: Hunan
- Prefecture-level city: Zhuzhou
- County: Chaling

Area
  - Total: 140.66 km^{2} (54.31 sq mi)

Population
  - Total: 19,500
  - Density: 139/km^{2} (359/sq mi)
- Time zone: UTC+8 (China Standard)
- Area code: 0733

Gaolong Town (simplified Chinese: 高陇镇; traditional Chinese: 高隴鎮; pinyin: Gāolǒng Zhèn) is an urban town in Chaling County, Hunan Province, People's Republic of China.

== Cityscape ==
The town is divided into 17 villages and 1 community, which includes the following areas: Gaolong Community, Guangming Village, Xinggao Village, Shichuang Village, Lishi Village, Songjiang Village, Guangquan Village, Longji Village, Xingfeng Village, Gucheng Village, Zhuangtian Village, Renyuan Village, Shichong Village, Madu Village, Bailong Village, Shuitou Village, Changxing Village, and Jiudu Village.
