= Taokeng, Chaling =

Taokeng Township 桃坑乡
- Township
- Location in Hunan
- Coordinates: 26°40′09″N 113°45′07″E
- Country: People's Republic of China
- Province: Hunan
- Prefecture-level city: Zhuzhou
- County: Chaling

Area
  - Total: 270 km^{2} (100 sq mi)

Population
  - Total: 16,200
  - Density: 60/km^{2} (160/sq mi)
- Time zone: UTC+8 (China Standard)
- Area code: 0733

Taokeng Township (simplified Chinese: 桃坑乡; traditional Chinese: 桃坑鄉; pinyin: Táokēng Xiāng) is a rural township in Chaling County, Hunan Province, People's Republic of China.

== Cityscape ==
The township is divided into 24 villages, which include the following areas: Kengkou Village, Shangping Village, Dafen Village, Shitan Village, Yekeng Village, Taokeng Village, Shangyuan Village, Zhongyuan Village, Maxi Village, Daijiang Village, Tianhe Village, Xiale Village, Dongjiang Village, Zhongdong Village, Nankeng Village, Xikeng Village, Datang Village, Xiangjiang Village, Guaping Village, Chunfeng Village, Jiaoping Village, Xiaofeng Village, Huali Village, and Caixia Village.
