= Wuxingzhan =

170 BCE text on astronomy and astrology, Hunan

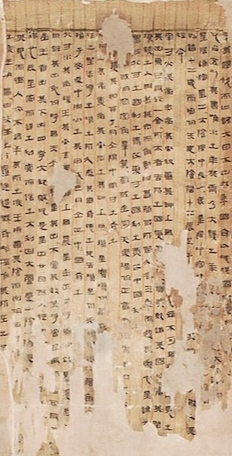
A silk manuscript of the Wuxingzhan, from the Hunan Museum

The Wuxingzhan (五星占), translated to English as the Prognostications of the Five Planets, is a 170 BCE text on astronomy and astrology found in Mawangdui tomb, near Changsha, Hunan. The text was compiled around the Han Dynasty period in China. Thought to be lost, the text was rediscovered during the 1970s.

== Contents ==
The text is about nine chapters covering different planets: Jupiter, Venus, Mars, Saturn, and Mercury. The Wuxingzhan provides numerical data on the visibility and movement of the five classical planets in a non-classical order. It also includes original excerpts from ancient Chinese astronomical works by Gan De and Shi Shen.

=== Saturn ===
The Wuxingzhan states that Saturn's orbital period is 30 years, in comparison, the Grand Inception Calendar says 29.79 years. Much like the calendar, the Wuxingzhan is more concerned with calendrical accuracy than relying on mere astrology.

=== Venus ===
In terms of Venus, the Wuxingzhan states that the planet is visible for 224 days, correcting the 240 days noted in other sources, likely due to a copying error. Venus's true orbital period is about 224.70 days, but early Chinese astronomers struggled to define it clearly due to its position relative to the sun. They described its visibility in terms of "appearing and disappearing." The Wuxingzhan also mentions a 16.96-day interval between Venus's disappearance as an evening star and reappearance as a morning star, differing from the 35 days in Huainanzi, possibly due to viewing conditions.

== Influence ==
The Huainanzi, another text from the Han Dysnaty period, uses the Wuxingzhan as its source on astrology. China scholar John S. Major notes that the Huainanzi, drawing from the Wuxingzhan, summarizes the astrology of the five planets without technical details for the "executive summary". In contrast, the "Treatise" uses the Wuxingzhan to detail the planets' predictions.
