= Xiadong, Chaling =

Xiadong Township 下东乡
- Township
- Location in Hunan
- Coordinates: 26°46′25″N 113°31′48″E
- Country: People's Republic of China
- Province: Hunan
- Prefecture-level city: Zhuzhou
- County: Chaling

Area
  - Total: 31.9 km^{2} (12.3 sq mi)

Population
  - Total: 17,200
  - Density: 539/km^{2} (1,400/sq mi)
- Time zone: UTC+8 (China Standard)
- Area code: 0733

Xiadong Township (simplified Chinese: 下东乡; traditional Chinese: 下東鄉; pinyin: Xiàdōng Xiāng) is a rural township in Chaling County, Hunan Province, People's Republic of China.

== Cityscape ==
The township is divided into 18 villages, which include the following areas: Toupu Village, Rushiping Village, Huangtang Village, Chayuan Village, Fengshu Village, Tiaoxin Village, Xiaoche Village, Guanghui Village, Dongshanba Village, Erpu Village, Qiaobian Village, Xintian Village, Guanpu Village, Jinxing Village, Qixin Village, Mengxi Village, Changle Village, and Silian Village.
