= Zaoshi, Chaling =

Zaoshi Town 枣市镇
- Town
- Location in Hunan
- Coordinates: 26°40′15″N 113°26′38″E
- Country: People's Republic of China
- Province: Hunan
- Prefecture-level city: Zhuzhou
- County: Chaling

Area
  - Total: 112.75 km^{2} (43.53 sq mi)

Population
  - Total: 27,000
  - Density: 240/km^{2} (620/sq mi)
- Time zone: UTC+8 (China Standard)
- Area code: 0733

Zaoshi Town (simplified Chinese: 枣市镇; traditional Chinese: 棗市鎮; pinyin: Zǎoshì Zhèn) is an urban town in Chaling County, Hunan Province, People's Republic of China.

== Cityscape ==
The town is divided into 18 villages and 1 community, which include the following areas: Zaoshi Community, Guantang Village, Dongling Village, Xiling Village, Yankou Village, Zaoyuan Village, Dongtou Village, Lingguan Village, Jingyuan Village, Wuxing Village, Chebei Village, Sashui Village, Tianjia Village, Houquan Village, Dachong Village, Huxing Village, Duijiang Village, Caobai Village, and Haitan Village.
