= Batuan, Chaling =

Batuan Township 八团乡
- Township
- Location in Hunan
- Coordinates: 27°02′10″N 113°43′20″E
- Country: People's Republic of China
- Province: Hunan
- Prefecture-level city: Zhuzhou
- County: Chaling

Area
  - Total: 116 km^{2} (45 sq mi)

Population
  - Total: 65,000
  - Density: 560/km^{2} (1,500/sq mi)
- Time zone: UTC+8 (China Standard)
- Area code: 0733

Batuan (simplified Chinese: 八团乡; traditional Chinese: 八團鄉; pinyin: Bātuán Xiāng) is a historic township in the north of Chaling County, Hunan, China. As a historic division of Chaling, Batuan Commune (八团公社) was created in 1961 from part of Huotian Commune (火田公社). The commune was reorganized as a township in 1984. On November 20, 2015, Batuan Township was merged to Huotian Town (火田镇).

== Subdivisions ==
The township is divided into 14 villages, which include the following areas: Baishi Community, Wolong Village, Peijiang Village, Daying Village, Xiaoying Village, Donghuang Village, Dongping Village, Shigu Village, Xiangyang Village, Dalong Village, Daping Village, Meizhuang Village, Tilong Village, and Jiangdong Village.
