= Jieshou, Chaling =

Jieshou Town 界首镇
- Town
- Location in Hunan
- Coordinates: 26°36′14″N 113°24′48″E
- Country: People's Republic of China
- Province: Hunan
- Prefecture-level city: Zhuzhou
- County: Chaling County

Area
  - Total: 84 km^{2} (32 sq mi)

Population
  - Total: 28,000
  - Density: 330/km^{2} (860/sq mi)
- Time zone: UTC+8 (China Standard)
- Area code: 0733

Jieshou Town (simplified Chinese: 界首镇; traditional Chinese: 界首鎮; pinyin: Jièshǒu Zhèn) is an urban town in Chaling County, Hunan Province, People's Republic of China.

== Cityscape ==
The town is divided into 18 villages and 1 community, which includes the following areas: Jieshou Community, Baizhou Village, Huoxing Village, Miaoqian Village, Hongguang Village, Jieshi Village, Daxin Village, Hepu Village, Gongfu Village, Helong Village, Shanglian Village, Jingling Village, Lianhe Village, Zhuling Village, Jiashan Village, Hejia Village, Huajia Village, Baisha Village, and Cangxia Village.
