= Lingfang, Chaling =

Lingfang Township 舲舫乡
- Township
- Location in Hunan
- Coordinates: 26°43′35″N 113°36′48″E
- Country: People's Republic of China
- Province: Hunan
- Prefecture-level city: Zhuzhou
- County: Chaling

Area
  - Total: 87.4 km^{2} (33.7 sq mi)

Population
  - Total: 29,100
  - Density: 333/km^{2} (862/sq mi)
- Time zone: UTC+8 (China Standard)
- Area code: 0733

Lingfang Township (simplified Chinese: 舲舫乡; traditional Chinese: 舲舫鄉; pinyin: Língfǎng Xiāng) is a rural township in Chaling County, Hunan Province, People's Republic of China.

== Cityscape ==
The township is divided into 18 villages, which include the following areas: Dizhou Village, Changya Village, Tangchong Village, Lingfang Village, Yuanjing Village, Songjiang Village, Xi'an Village, Hewu Village, Zikeng Village, Zhongzhou Village, Zhongzhou Village, Taoshui Village, Ciwan Village, Longzhukeng Village, Zhangyang Village, Dayue Village, Nanchong Village, Chepu Village, and Guanxi Village.
