= Yaolu =

Town in Hunan, China

Yaolu (Chinese: 腰潞镇; pinyin: yāo-lù zhèn) is a town located in the middle east of Chaling County, Hunan, China. The town was formed by merging 9 villages of the former Lushui Town, 24 villages and a community of the former Yaopi Town (腰陂镇) on November 20, 2015. Yaolu covers an area of 282.09 km^{2} (108.92 sq mi), and as of 2015, it has a population of 64,600. Its administrative centre is at Yaopi community (腰陂).
