= Yantang, Chaling =

Yantang Town 严塘镇
- Town
- Location in Hunan
- Coordinates: 26°47′23″N 113°41′48″E
- Country: People's Republic of China
- Province: Hunan
- Prefecture-level city: Zhuzhou
- County: Chaling

Area
  - Total: 243 km^{2} (94 sq mi)

Population
  - Total: 40,750
  - Density: 168/km^{2} (434/sq mi)
- Time zone: UTC+8 (China Standard)
- Area code: 0733

Yantang Town (simplified Chinese: 严塘镇; traditional Chinese: 嚴塘鎮; pinyin: Yántáng Zhèn) is an urban town in Chaling County, Hunan Province, People's Republic of China.

== Cityscape ==
The town is divided into 32 villages and 1 community, which includes the following areas: Xinjie Community, Zhangshi Village, Kanxia Village, Helei Village, Gaoxing Village, Wanli Village, Jingtou Village, Longshang Village, Gantang Village, Zhongbao Village, Shangwan Village, Meitian Village, Tangjing Village, Tianxin Village, Hexin Village, Zhuping Village, Youzui Village, Shaxi Village, Ranyang Village, Shajiang Village, Huangqian Village, Changjiang Village, Longli Village, Yaoshi Village, Huamu Village, Quanshan Village, Nan'an Village, Lianxin Village, Daixi Village, Shansi Village, Aili Village, Shuanglong Village, and Gaojin Village.
