= Huanxi, Chaling =

Huanxi Town
- Town

Chinese transcription(s)
  - Simplified: 浣溪镇
  - Traditional: 浣溪鎮
  - Pinyin: Huànxī Zhèn
- Location in China
- Coordinates: 26°33′47″N 113°36′03″E
- Country: People's Republic of China
- Province: Hunan
- City: Zhuzhou
- County: Chaling County

Area
  - Total: 136 km^{2} (53 sq mi)

Population
  - Total: 16,000
  - Density: 120/km^{2} (300/sq mi)
- Time zone: UTC+8 (China Standard)
- Area code: 0733

Huanxi Town (simplified Chinese: 浣溪镇; traditional Chinese: 浣溪鎮; pinyin: Huànxī Zhèn) is an urban town in Chaling County, Zhuzhou City, Hunan Province, People's Republic of China.

== Cityscape ==
The town is divided into 17 villages and 1 community:

- Youyi Village
- Matang Village
- Tuqiao Village
- Meilin Village
- Hetang Village
- Gumu Village
- Dongliu Village
- Badan Village
- Taiying Village
- Bailu Village
- Feiyan Village
- Xijiang Village
- Longxia Village
- Xiaofen Village
- Xiaxiao Village
- Yangliu Village
- Hanjiang Village
- Huanxi Community
