= Pingshui, Chaling =

Pingshui Town
- Town

Chinese transcription(s)
  - Simplified: 平水镇
  - Traditional: 平水鎮
  - Pinyin: Pingshui Zhen
- Location in China
- Coordinates: 26°50′33″N 113°24′06″E
- Country: People's Republic of China
- Province: Hunan
- City: Zhuzhou
- County: Chaling County

Area
  - Total: 137.6 km^{2} (53.1 sq mi)

Population
  - Total: 26,760
  - Density: 194.5/km^{2} (503.7/sq mi)
- Time zone: UTC+8 (China Standard)
- Area code: 0733

Pingshui Town (simplified Chinese: 平水镇; traditional Chinese: 平水鎮; pinyin: Píngshuǐ Zhèn) is an urban town in Chaling County, Zhuzhou City, Hunan Province, People's Republic of China.

== Cityscape ==
The town is divided into 19 villages and 1 community, which include the following areas: Pingshui Community, Huangshi Village, Longzhouxin Village, Baji Village, Shuiyuan Village, Fengxian Village, Shijiang Village, Sanmen Village, Hedong Village, Maoping Village, Jinshan Village, Qiujia Village, Shizhu Village, Longxin Village, Shibaotou Village, Erxian Village, Wufeng Village, Xiping Village, Huangnitang Village, and Xiaoshui Village.
