= Zhitang, Chaling =

Zhitang Town 秩堂镇
- Town
- Location in Hunan
- Coordinates: 26°56′32″N 113°51′23″E
- Country: People's Republic of China
- Province: Hunan
- Prefecture-level city: Zhuzhou
- County: Chaling

Area
  - Total: 163 km^{2} (63 sq mi)

Population
  - Total: 26,000
  - Density: 160/km^{2} (410/sq mi)
- Time zone: UTC+8 (China Standard)
- Area code: 0733

Zhitang Town (simplified Chinese: 秩堂镇; traditional Chinese: 秩堂鎮; pinyin: Zhìtáng Zhèn) is an urban town in Chaling County, Hunan Province, People's Republic of China.

== Cityscape ==
The town is divided into 17 villages and 1 community, which include the following areas: Pengjiaci Community, Ankengci Village, Xiaotang Village, Hehu Village, Tianhu Village, Dongshou Village, Mashou Village, Jichuan Village, Xinjiang Village, Huangtu Village, Shilong Village, Shilong Village, Pitang Village, Xiaotian Village, Xihu Village, Jinhu Village, Taihu Village, Dongkeng Village, and Huangcao Village.
