= Hukou, Chaling =

Hukou Town 湖口镇
- Town
- Location in Hunan
- Coordinates: 26°36′10″N 113°39′14″E
- Country: People's Republic of China
- Province: Hunan
- Prefecture-level city: Zhuzhou
- County: Chaling

Area
  - Total: 72.7 km^{2} (28.1 sq mi)

Population
  - Total: 34,000
  - Density: 470/km^{2} (1,200/sq mi)
- Time zone: UTC+8 (China Standard)
- Area code: 0733

Hukou Town (simplified Chinese: 湖口镇; traditional Chinese: 湖口鎮; pinyin: Húkǒu Zhèn) is an urban town in Chaling County, Hunan Province, People's Republic of China.

== Cityscape ==
| Hukou Community Beidou Village; Changjiang Village; Huanghu Village; Hukou Village; Jiangnan Village; Jinghe Village | Miaoshi Village Midu Village; Nanjiang Village; Qingcheng Village; Shannan Village; Shihu Village; Shijing Village; Tangtou Village | Tongxin Village Xiaotan Village; Xincheng Village; Xinyuan Village; Yikou Village; Yixin Village; Yuanxian Village; Zhuyuan Village |
