= Yunyang Subdistrict =

Yunyang Subdistrict 云阳街道
- Town
- Location in Hunan
- Coordinates: 26°47′13″N 113°32′17″E
- Country: People's Republic of China
- Province: Hunan
- Prefecture-level city: Zhuzhou
- County: Chaling

Area
  - Total: 14 km^{2} (5.4 sq mi)

Population
  - Total: 90,000
  - Density: 6,400/km^{2} (17,000/sq mi)
- Time zone: UTC+8 (China Standard)
- Area code: 0733

Yunyang Subdistrict (simplified Chinese: 云阳街道; traditional Chinese: 雲陽街道; pinyin: Yúnyáng Jiēdào) is an urban subdistrict and the seat of Chaling County in Hunan, China.

== Cityscape ==
The town is divided into 4 villages and 6 communities, which includes the following areas: Jinshan Community, Yandi Community, Mishui Community, Jiaotong Community, Yunpan Community, Layuan Community, Qianjin Village, Nonglin Village, Shibaqiu Village, and Qujiang Village.
