= Huotian, Chaling =

Huotian Town 火田镇
- Town
- Location in Hunan
- Coordinates: 26°56′56″N 113°42′33″E
- Country: People's Republic of China
- Province: Hunan
- Prefecture-level city: Zhuzhou
- County: Chaling

Area
  - Total: 144 km^{2} (56 sq mi)
- Time zone: UTC+8 (China Standard)
- Area code: 0733

Huotian Town (simplified Chinese: 火田镇; traditional Chinese: 火田鎮; pinyin: Huǒtián Zhèn) is an urban town in Chaling County, Hunan Province, People's Republic of China.

== Cityscape ==
The town is divided into 14 villages and 1 community, which include the following areas: Huotian Community, Wumen Village, Beishui Village, Xinhua Village, Lianxi Village, Miaobei Village, Mafu Village, Beijiang Village, Gushi Village, Shantian Village, Fujiang Village, Zhoubei Village, Fengjing Village, Zhangchong Village, and Shaxia Village.
