= Hunan Museum =

- 湖南博物院
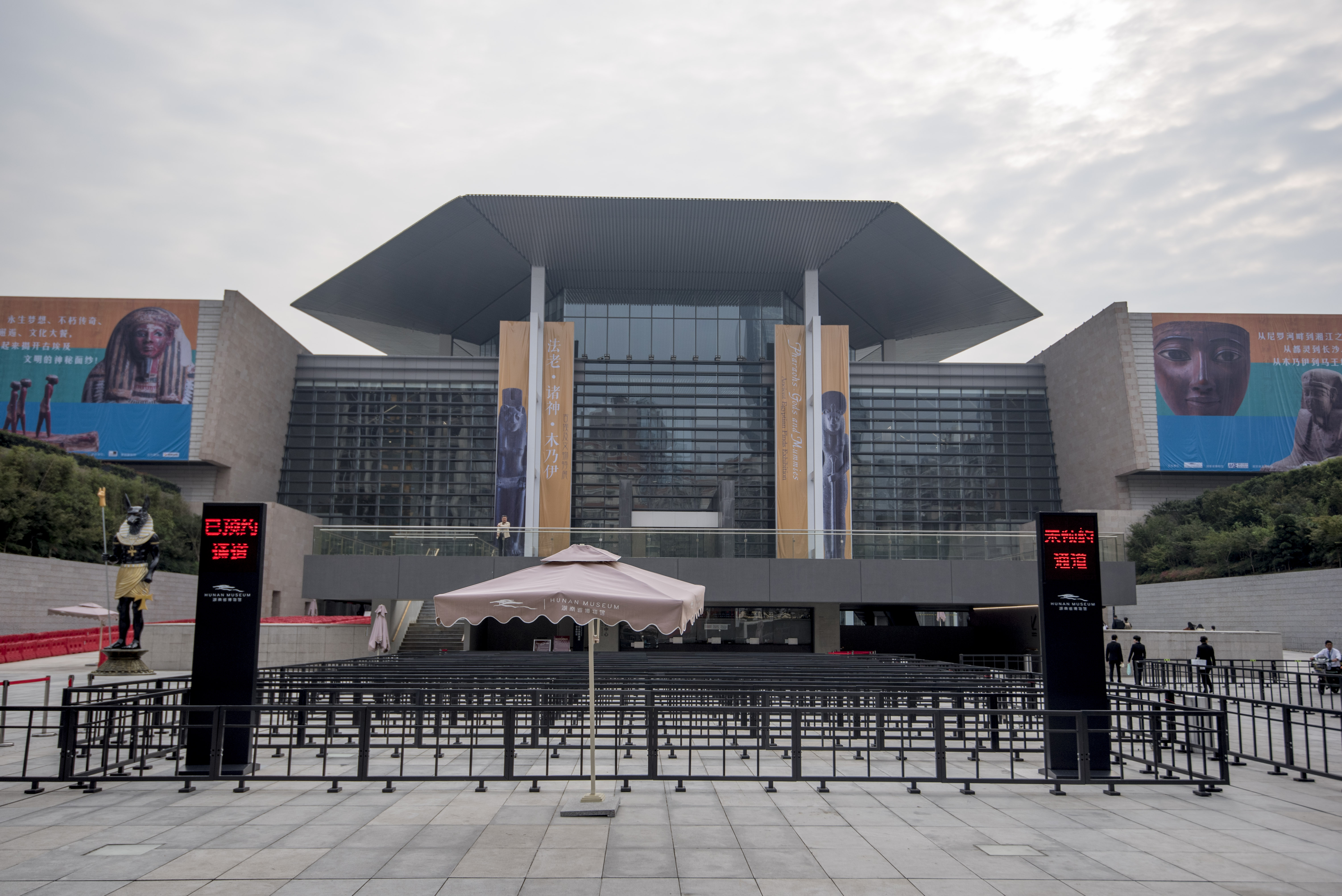
- New building of Hunan Museum
- Interactive fullscreen map
- Established: 1951
- Location: Kaifu District, Changsha, Hunan, China
- Coordinates: 28°12′55″N 112°59′16″E
- Type: Provincial museum
- Key holdings: Cultural relics from Mawangdui
- Collections: 180,000
- President: Chen Jianmin (陈建民)
- Website: www.hnmuseum.com/en

Chinese name
- Chinese: 湖南博物院
Transcriptions
Standard Mandarin
- Hanyu Pinyin: Húnán Bówùyuàn

The Hunan Museum (Chinese: 湖南博物院) is the provincial museum of Hunan, China. It was built in 1951 and opened to the public in July 1956. It is located in the provincial capital Changsha at No. 50, Dongfeng Lu next to the Revolutionary Martyr's Park.

It spans a total area of about 50,000 square metres (12 acres), with a constructed area of 20,000 square metres (4.9 acres).

The museum has a collection of more than 180,000 objects, including items found in the tombs of the Marquis of Dai and his wife, Xin Zhui, in Mawangdui.

The museum was closed on 18 June 2012 for renovation and expansion works and reopened on 29 November 2017.

== History ==
The Hunan Museum was first built in 1951 and opened to the public in July 1956.

On June 18, 2012, the museum closed its doors to the public due to reconstruction. China Central Academy of Fine Arts, assisted by Japanese architect Arata Isozaki, designed the present building. The construction began in 2012 and the museum was completed in 2017. The museum was reopened to the general public on November 29, 2017. The new building covers approximately 49,000 square metres (530,000 sq ft), with a building area of 91,000 square metres (980,000 sq ft).

== Gallery ==
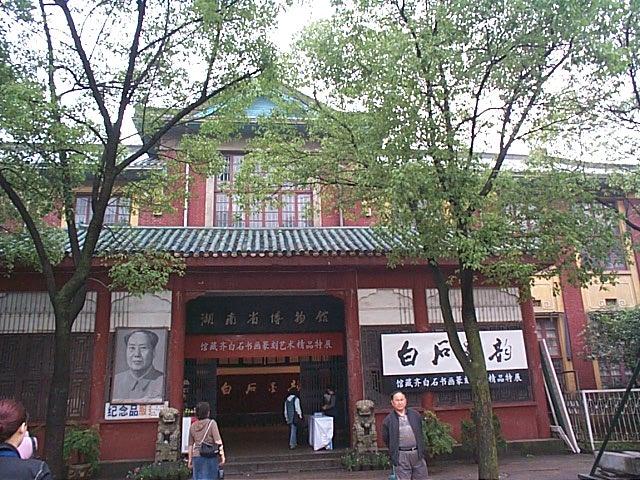
The entrance to the museum (2002)

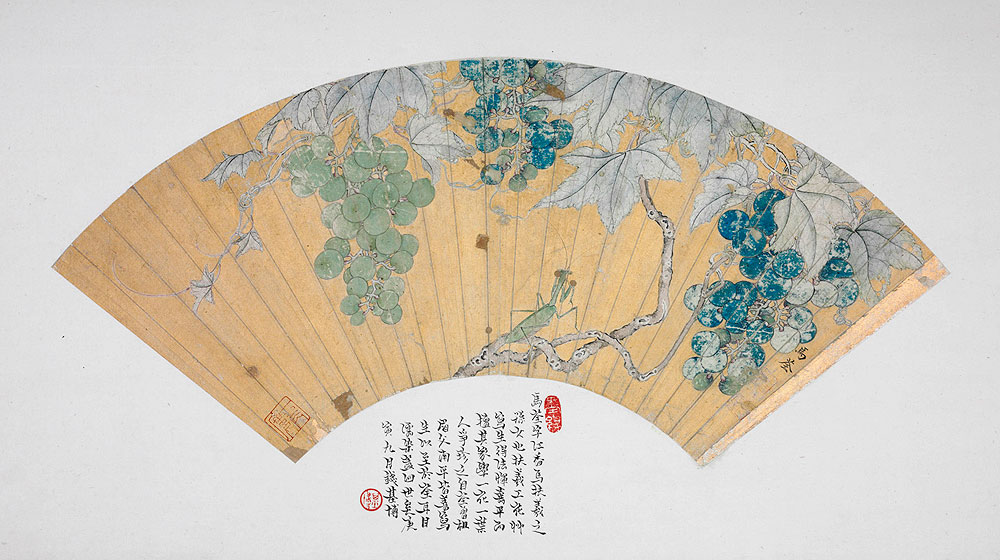
Eighteenth century painting by Ma Quan, Grapes and Mantis (葡萄螳螂图)
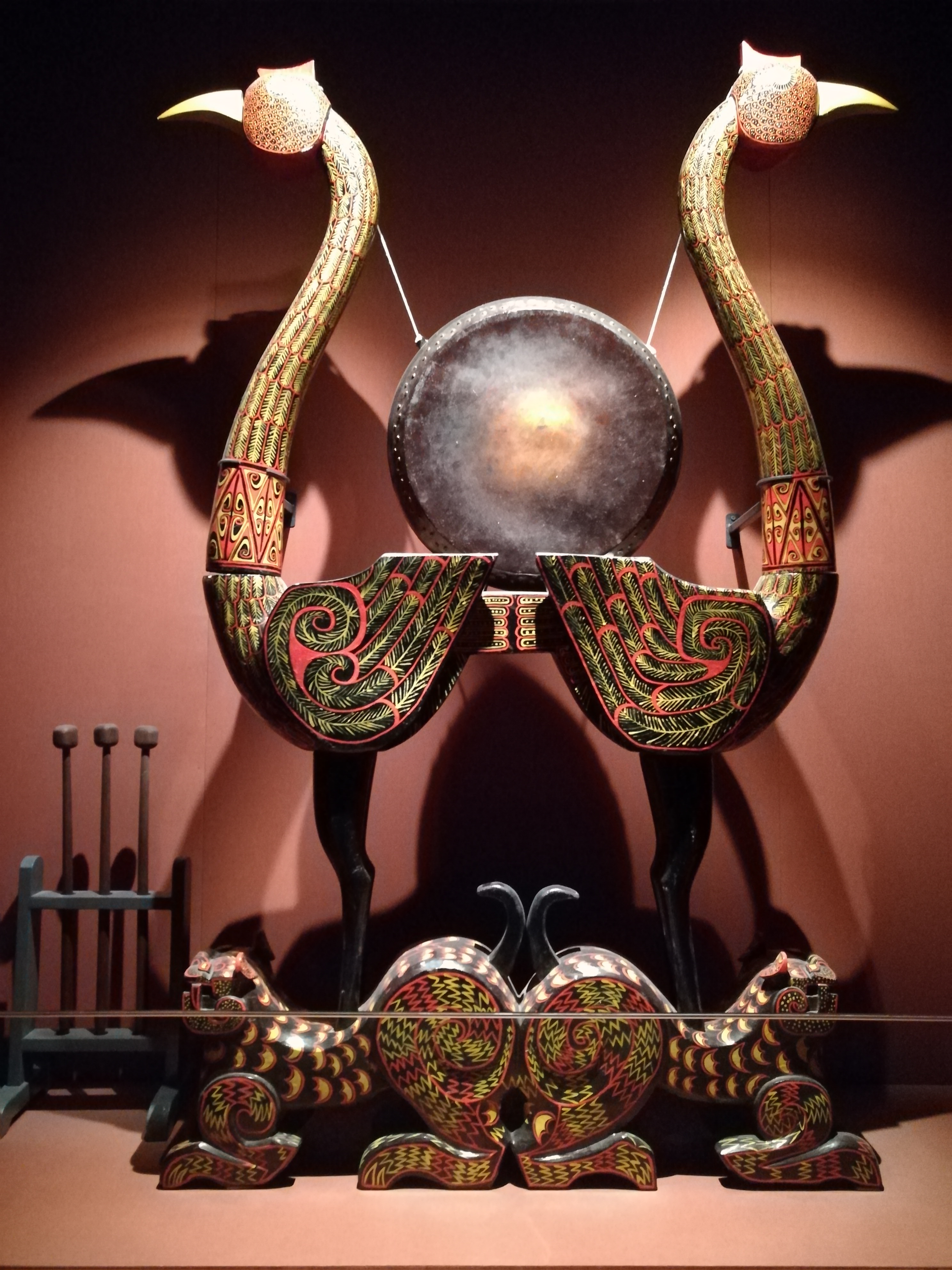
Warring States bronze drum

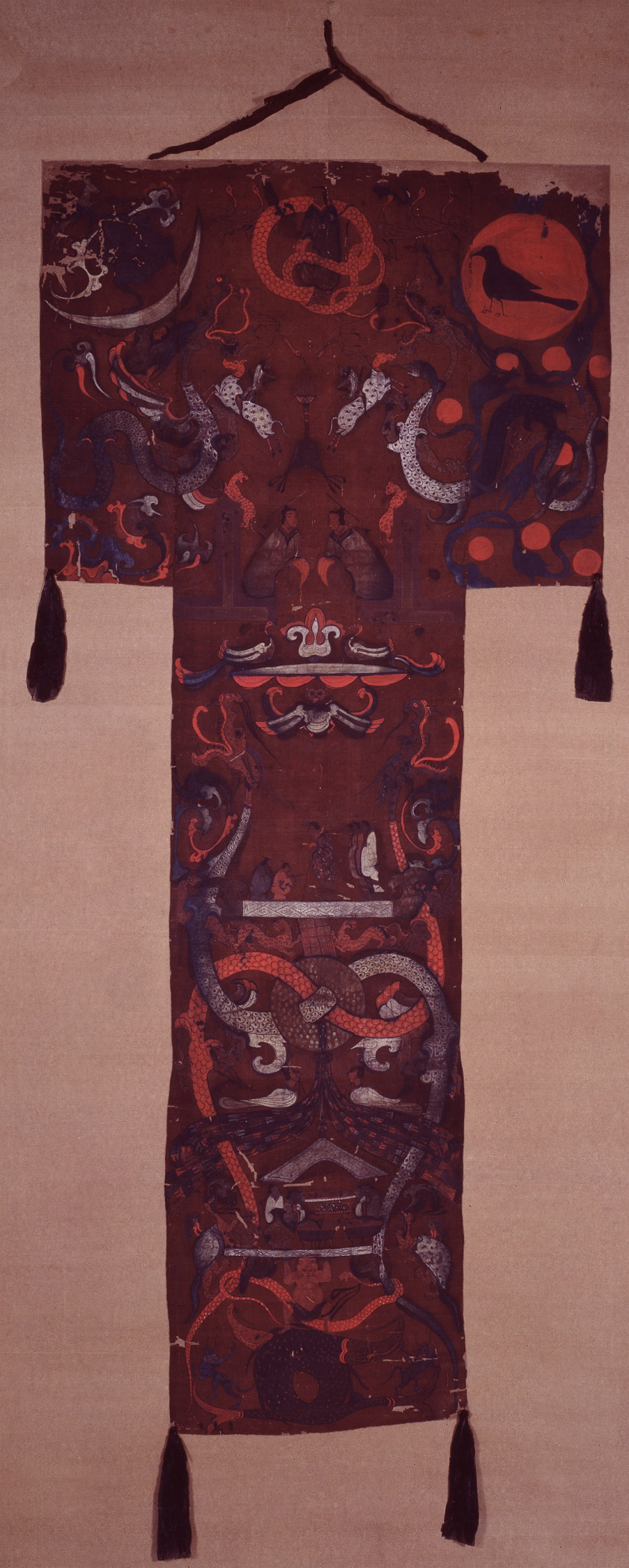
Western Han funerary banner from the tomb of Xin Zhui, Mawangdui

== See also ==
- List of museums in China
