= Mijiang, Chaling =

Mijiang Township 洣江乡
- Township
- Location in Hunan
- Coordinates: 26°47′31″N 113°33′22″E
- Country: People's Republic of China
- Province: Hunan
- Prefecture-level city: Zhuzhou
- County: Chaling

Area
  - Total: 41.2 km^{2} (15.9 sq mi)

Population
  - Total: 26,670
  - Density: 647/km^{2} (1,680/sq mi)
- Time zone: UTC+8 (China Standard)
- Area code: 0733

Mijiang Township (simplified Chinese: 洣江乡; traditional Chinese: 洣江鄉; pinyin: Mǐjiāng Xiāng) is a rural township in Chaling County, Hunan Province, People's Republic of China.

== Cityscape ==
The township is divided into 18 villages, which include the following areas: Xiayao Community, Zhongyao Village, Hujia Village, Xinhe Village, Dazhou Village, Duli Village, Hutang Village, Yahuan Village, Oujiang Village, Wulongping Village, Taoyuan Village, Shiliang Village, Ronghua Village, Gongtang Village, Zhangshu Village, Lixin Village, Zhumu Village, and Xingqiao Village.
