= Majiang, Chaling =

Majiang Town 马江镇
- Town
- Location in Hunan
- Coordinates: 26°42′43″N 113°32′25″E
- Country: People's Republic of China
- Province: Hunan
- Prefecture-level city: Zhuzhou
- County: Chaling

Area
  - Total: 85 km^{2} (33 sq mi)

Population
  - Total: 33,000
  - Density: 390/km^{2} (1,000/sq mi)
- Time zone: UTC+8 (China Standard)
- Area code: 0733

Najiang Town (simplified Chinese: 马江镇; traditional Chinese: 馬江鎮; pinyin: Mǎjiāng Zhèn) is an urban town in Chaling County, Hunan Province, People's Republic of China.

== Cityscape ==
The town is divided into 19 villages and 1 community, which includes the following areas: Majiang Community, Changyuan Village, Hongqi Village, Changlian Village, Motou Village, Tangfu Village, Dongchong Village, Xichong Village, Mayuan Village, Maojia Village, Jingquan Village, Xiaobi Village, Yueling Village, Mashi Village, Xuanwu Village, Gaoyuan Village, Zenghu Village, Dengping Village, Langtan Village, and Lianhu Village.
