= Mawangdui =

Archaeological site in China

Coordinates: 28°12′31″N 113°01′18″E

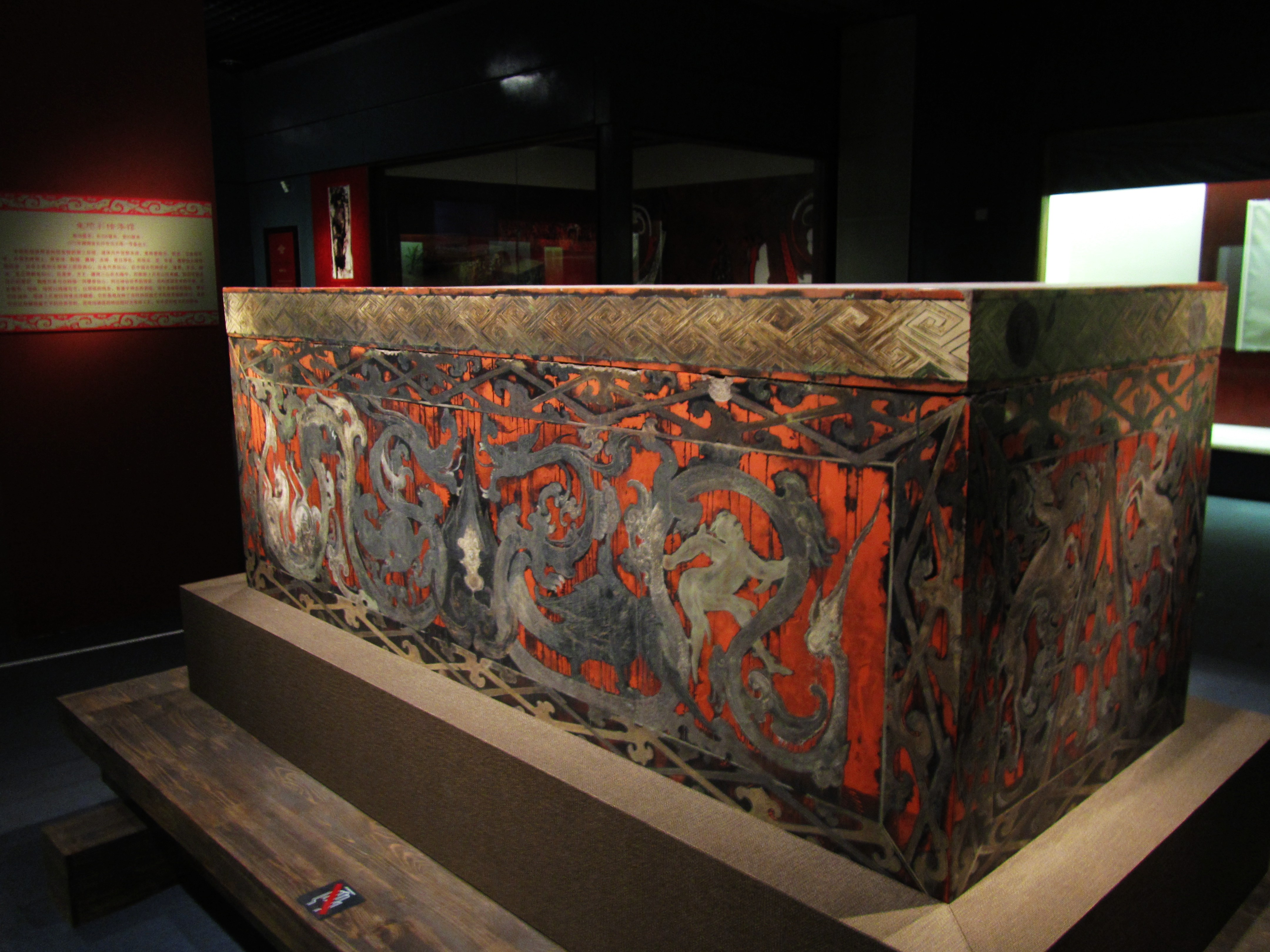
The lacquered coffin of lady Xin Zhui (217–168 BC). Unearthed from Tomb No. 1 at Mawangdui, 2nd century BC

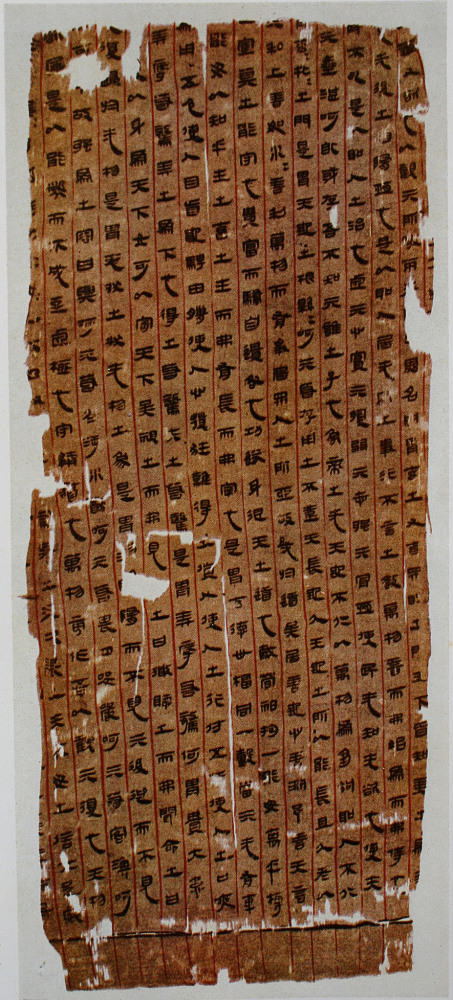
Manuscript on silk, 2nd century BC

Mawangdui (simplified Chinese: 马王堆; traditional Chinese: 馬王堆; pinyin: Mǎwángduī; lit. 'King Ma's Mound') is an archaeological site located in Changsha, China. The site consists of two saddle-shaped hills and contained the tombs of three people from the Changsha Kingdom during the western Han dynasty (206 BC – 9 AD): the Chancellor Li Cang, his wife Xin Zhui, and a male believed to have been their son. The site was excavated from 1972 to 1974. Most of the artifacts from Mawangdui are displayed at the Hunan Provincial Museum. It was called "King Ma's Mound" possibly because it was (erroneously) thought to be the tomb of Ma Yin (853–930), a ruler of the Chu kingdom during the Five Dynasties and Ten Kingdoms period. The original name might have been the similarly-sounding "saddle-shaped mound" (馬鞍堆; mǎ ān duī).

== Tombs and their occupants ==
The tombs were made of large cypress planks. The outside of the tombs were layered with white clay and charcoal. White clay layering originated with Chu burials, while charcoal layering was practiced during the early western Han dynasty in the Changsha area. The tombs contained nested lacquered coffins, a Chu burial custom. The four lacquered coffins are estimated to represent one million hours of human labour. The tombs also followed the burial practices dictated by Emperor Wen of Han, containing no jade or precious metals.

The eastern tomb, Tomb no. 1, contained the remains of a woman in her fifties (Lady Dai, personal name Xin Zhui). Her mummified body was so well-preserved that researchers were able to perform an autopsy on her body, which showed that she probably died of a heart attack. Specifically, her diet was too rich in sugars and meats, and she suffered from arterial-coronary problems. Buried with her were skeletons of various food-animals, jujubes, lotus soup, grains and a complete meal including soup, rice and meat skewers on a lacquer set. Researchers found honeydew melon seeds in her stomach, implying consumption right before death. She outlived the occupants of the other two tombs.

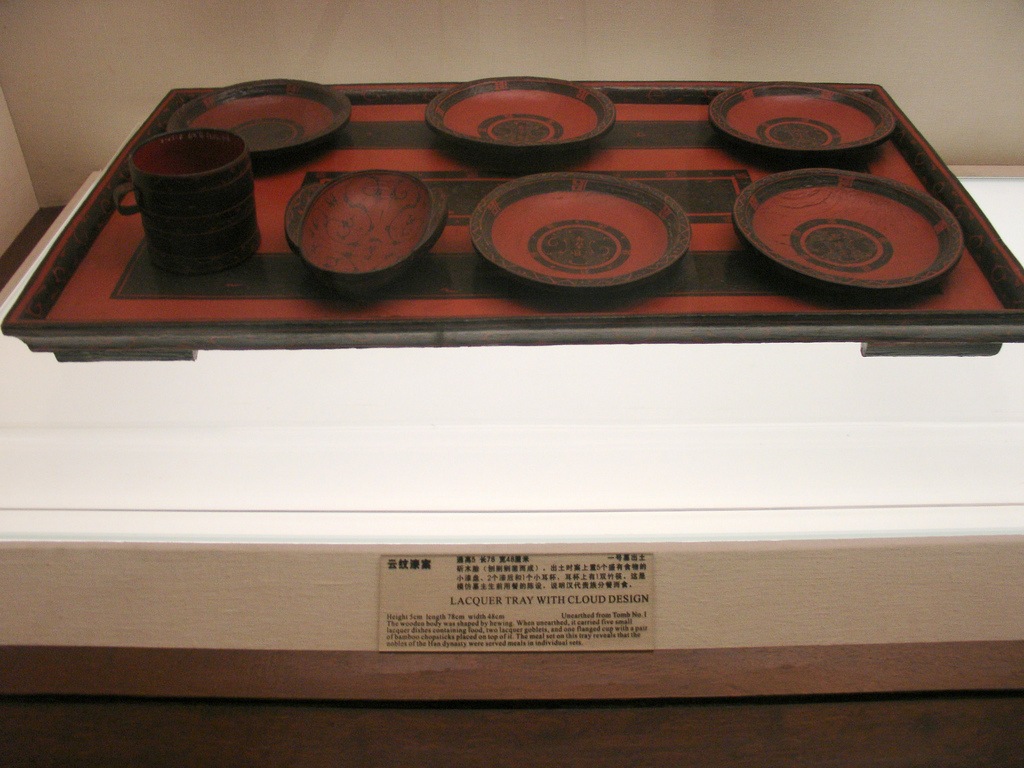
Western Han (202 BC – 9 AD) era lacquerwares and lacquer tray unearthed from the 2nd-century-BC Han Tomb No.1 at Mawangdui

The tomb of Xin Zhui was by far the best preserved of the three. A complete cosmetic set, lacquered pieces and finely woven silk garments with paintings are almost perfectly preserved. Her coffins were painted according to Chu customs and beliefs, with whirling clouds interwoven with mystical animals and dragons. The corpse was bound tightly in layers of silk cloth and covered with a wonderfully painted T-shaped tapestry depicting the netherworld, earth and heavens with Chinese mythological characters as well as Xin Zhui. There was also a silk painting showing a variety of exercises that researchers have called the forerunner of tai ji.

The western tomb, Tomb no. 2, was the burial site of the first Marquis of Dai, Li Cang (利蒼). He died in 186 BC. The Han dynasty had appointed Li Cang as the chancellor of the Kingdom of Changsha, an imperial fiefdom of Han. This tomb had been plundered several times by grave robbers.

Tomb 3 was directly south of Tomb 1, and contained the tomb of a man in his thirties who died in 168 BC. The occupant is believed to have been a relative of Li Cang and his wife. This tomb contained a rich trove of military, medical, and astronomical manuscripts written on silk.

== Artifacts ==
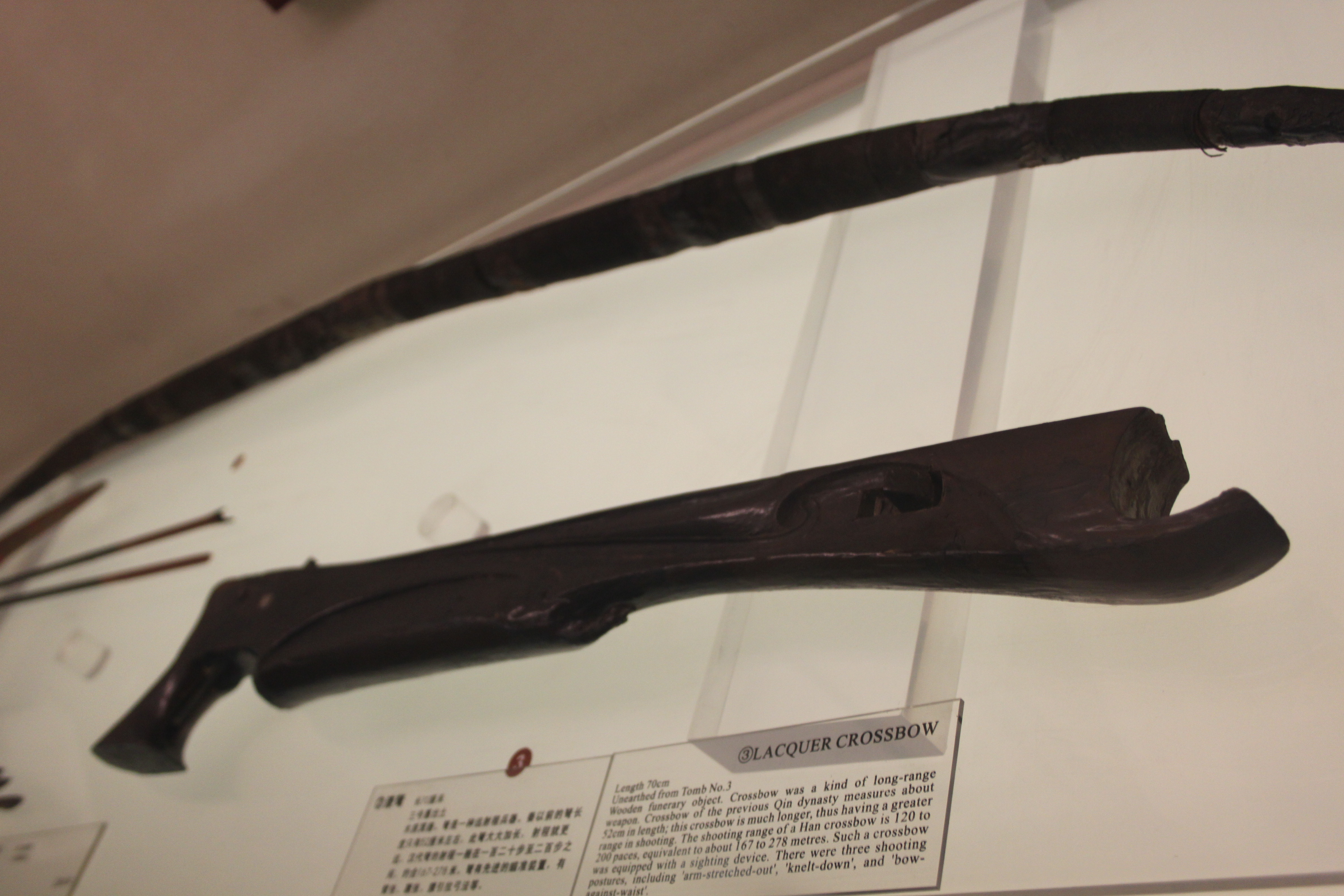
Crossbow from Mawangdui

=== Tombs 1 and 2 ===
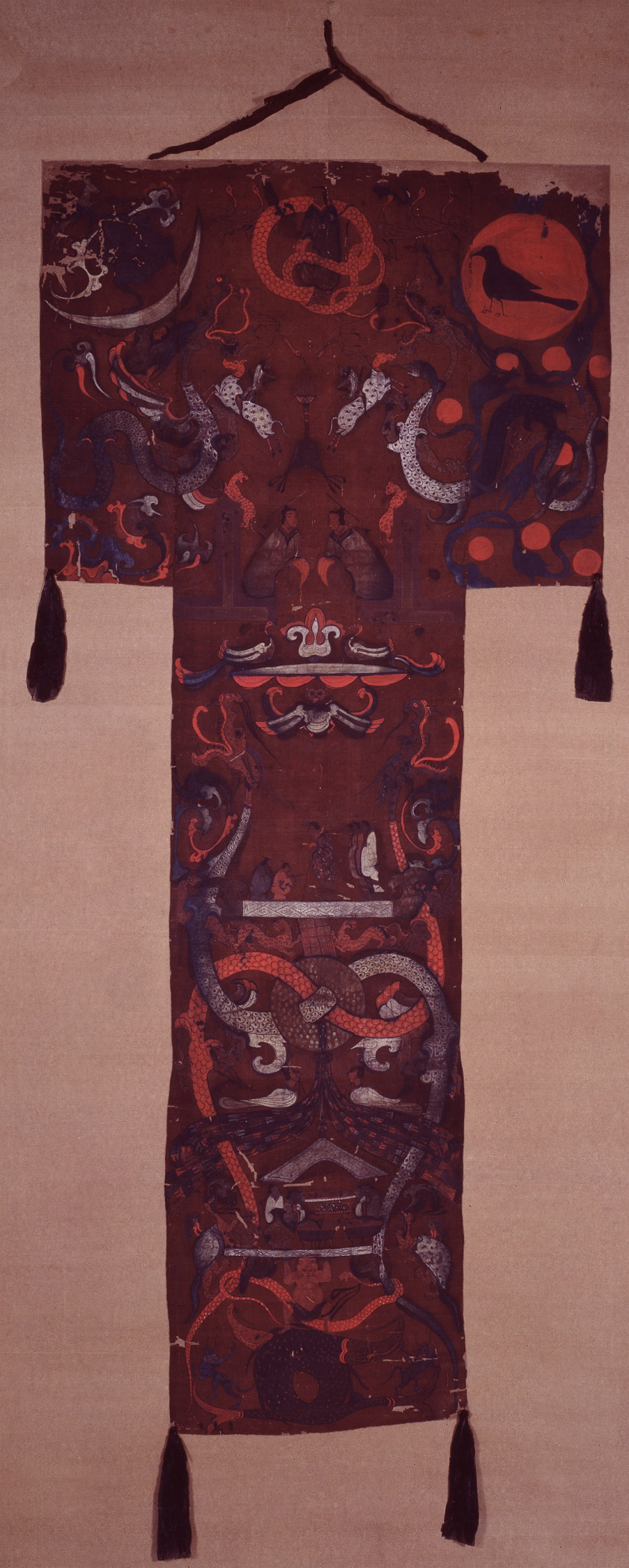
Western Han painting on silk was found draped over the coffin in the grave of Lady Dai (c. 168 BC) at Mawangdui near Changsha in Hunan province.

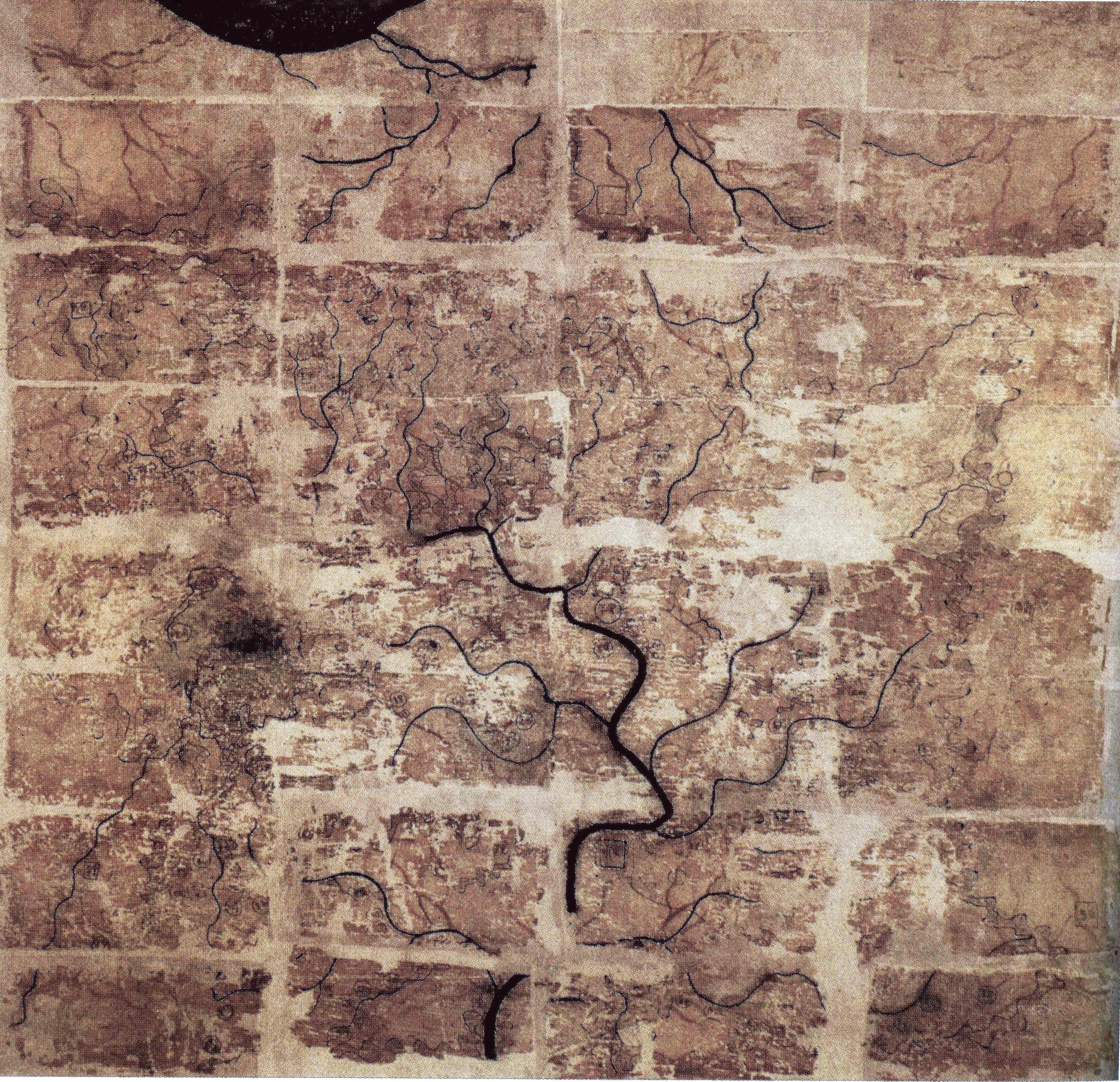
An early Western-Han silk map found in Tomb 3 of Mawangdui, depicting the Kingdom of Changsha and Kingdom of Nanyue in southern China (note: the south direction is oriented at the top).

Held in particularly high regard are the lacquered wine-bowls and cosmetic boxes, showcasing the regional lacquerware industry's craftsmanship.

Among the most famous artifacts from Mawangdui are the silk funeral banners. These T-shaped banners were draped on the coffin of Tomb 1. The banners depict the Chinese concepts of the cosmos and the afterlife at the time of the western Han dynasty. A silk banner of similar style and function was found in Tomb 3.

The T-shaped silk funeral banner in the tomb of the Marquise (Tomb 1) is called the "name banner" with the written name of the deceased replaced with a portrait. We know the name because the tomb's original inventory is still intact, and this is what it is called on the inventory. The Marquise was buried in four coffins; the silk banner drapes the innermost of the coffins.

On the T-shaped painted silk garment, the uppermost horizontal section of the T represents heaven. The bottom of the vertical section of the T represents the underworld. The middle (the top of the vertical) represents earth. In heaven we can see Chinese deities such as Nuwa and Chang'e, as well as Daoist symbols such as cranes (representing immortality). Between heaven and earth we can see heavenly messengers sent to bring Lady Dai to heaven. Underneath this are Lady Dai's family offering sacrifices to help her journey to heaven. Beneath them is the underworld, with two giant sea serpents intertwined.

The contents of Tomb 2 had been destroyed or removed by robbers. An excavation report has been published in Chinese; there has not been an English printing yet.

=== Tomb 3 ===
Tomb 3 contained a silk name banner (similar to that of tomb 1) and three maps drawn on silk: a topographic map, a military map and a prefecture map. The maps display the Hunan, Guangdong and Guangxi region and depict the political boundary between the Han dynasty and Nanyue. At the time of discovery, these were the oldest maps yet discovered in China, until 1986 when Qin State maps dating to the 4th century BC were found.

Tomb 3 contained a wealth of classical texts. Texts on astronomy accurately depicted the planetary orbits for Venus, Jupiter, Mercury, Mars and Saturn and described various comets. Historical texts included the Chunqiu shiyu and a copy of the Zhan Guo Ce.

Mawangdui texts of the I Ching and Tao Te Ching are hundreds of years earlier than those known before. The tomb also contained a rich collection of Huang-Lao Taoist texts.

Various medical scrolls were found in Tomb 3, including depictions of daoyin (qigong) exercises and two silk scrolls documenting moxibustion, Moxibustion Classic of Eleven Foot-Hand Meridians (omitting the Pericardium channel) and Prescriptions for Fifty-two Diseases. Interestingly there are no references to acupuncture, indicating that moxibustion may have been a primary medical intervention at the time.

== See also ==
- Book of Silk
- Changsha Kingdom
- Han dynasty tomb architecture
- List of Chinese cultural relics forbidden to be exhibited abroad
- Mawangdui Silk Texts
- Tomb of Marquis Yi of Zeng
