= Sicong, Chaling =

Sicong Township 思聪乡
- Township
- Location in Hunan
- Coordinates: 26°48′48″N 113°32′19″E
- Country: People's Republic of China
- Province: Hunan
- Prefecture-level city: Zhuzhou
- County: Chaling

Area
  - Total: 41.2 km^{2} (15.9 sq mi)

Population
  - Total: 30,200
  - Density: 733/km^{2} (1,900/sq mi)
- Time zone: UTC+8 (China Standard)
- Area code: 0733

Sicong Township (simplified Chinese: 思聪乡; traditional Chinese: 思聰鄉; pinyin: Sīcōng Xiāng) is a rural township in Chaling County, Hunan Province, People's Republic of China.

== Cityscape ==
The township is divided into 13 villages and 1 community, which include the following areas: Huochazhan Community, Heping Village, Shentang Village, Hualong Village, Huaxing Village, Huafeng Village, Zuolong Village, Lianxing Village, Chachong Village, Liexing Village, Daxing Village, Sicong Village, Huishan Village, and Hongqiao Village.
