= Wu Rui =

3rd century BC Chinese general who helped Liu Bang establish the Han dynasty

Wu Rui 吳芮 (Chinese)
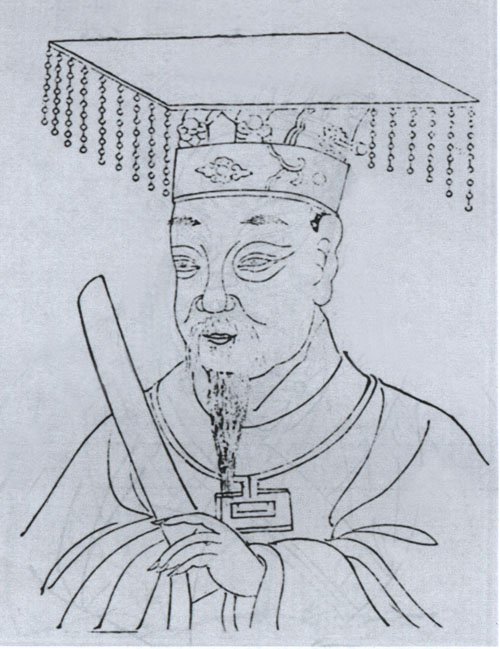
- Portrait from Wu's Genealogy in 1929

King of Hengshan (衡山王)
- Tenure: 206–March 202 BC

King of Changsha (長沙王)
- Tenure: March 202–September 202 BC
- Successor: Wu Chen (吳臣)
- Died: c. September 202 BC; Han China
- Issue: Lady Wu (吳氏), wife of Ying Bu; Wu Chen (吳臣)
Posthumous name
- Wen (文)

Wu Rui (Simplified Chinese: 吴芮; Traditional Chinese: 吳芮; died c. September 202 BC (Note: According to vol. 11 of Zizhi Tongjian, Wu Rui died in the 7th month of the 5th year of Liu Bang's reign (including his tenure as King of Han).)), King Wen of Changsha, was an ancient Chinese general and rebel leader who helped Liu Bang establish the Han dynasty. A Baiyue magistrate of Po County under the Qin dynasty, he rose to become King of Hengshan during the collapse of Qin and was enfeoffed as King of Changsha during the early Han dynasty.

== Life ==
An ethnic Yue, Wu Rui was the son of Wu Shen (吳申, Wú Shēn), formerly grand marshal (大司馬, dà sīmǎ, the highest military office) of the Chu state. During the Qin dynasty, Wu Rui was the magistrate of Po County, which had not yet flooded. He enjoyed high popularity and prestige among the local Baiyue people and was known as "Lord of the Po" (番君). After Chen Sheng and Wu Guang launched the Dazexiang Uprising against the Qin, Wu Rui organized a Baiyue army and joined the rebellion. Wu Rui's followers included Mei Xuan (梅鋗, Méi Xuān) and his son-in-law Ying Bu, both of whom assisted Liu Bang and played a major role in his victory against Qin and Xiang Yu.

In 206 BC, Wu Rui was bestowed the title King of Hengshan (衡山王, Héngshān wáng) by Xiang Yu, as one of the 18 kings under the "Hegemon-King of Western Chu" (a.k.a. Xiang Yu). In 202 BC, after Liu Bang's victory in the Battle of Gaixia, Wu Rui, along with other kings loyal to Liu Bang, called the latter to ascend the title of emperor. Soon after the foundation of Han dynasty, he was moved from Hengshan to become the King of Changsha. Wu Rui died shortly after reaching Linxiang (present-day Changsha), the capital of his new fief.

Wu Rui
- Traditional Chinese: 吳芮
- Simplified Chinese: 吴芮
Transcriptions
Standard Mandarin
- Hanyu Pinyin: Wú Ruì
- Wade–Giles: Wu Jui

== Legacy ==
Wu Rui was buried near Changsha. After his death, the kingdom passed to his son, Wu Chen (吳臣, Wú Chén). His descendants honored him under the posthumous name King Wen ("the civil king"). His line was the only one among non-Liu family kings to survive past Liu Bang's reign.

In the early Three Kingdoms period, Wu Rui's tomb was demolished to provide the source of wood for a new temple for Sun Jian. The body was so well preserved that one of the participants later commented to Wu Gang (吳綱, Wú Gāng), then "colonel of the Nanman" (南蠻校尉, Nánmán xiàowèi) and a living descendant of Wu Rui, that he looked particularly similar to his ancestor.
