= Huju, Hunan =

Huju Town 虎踞镇
- Town
- Location in Hunan
- Coordinates: 26°55′00″N 113°23′25″E
- Country: People's Republic of China
- Province: Hunan
- Prefecture-level city: Zhuzhou
- County: Chaling

Area
  - Total: 83 km^{2} (32 sq mi)

Population
  - Total: 28,000
  - Density: 340/km^{2} (870/sq mi)
- Time zone: UTC+8 (China Standard)
- Area code: 0733

Huju Town (simplified Chinese: 虎踞镇; traditional Chinese: 虎踞鎮; pinyin: Hǔjū Zhèn) is an urban town in Chaling County, Hunan Province, People's Republic of China.

== Cityscape ==
The town is divided into 15 villages and 1 community, which include the following areas: Huju Community, Shuangyuan Village, Hehu Village, Yinhu Village, Huxi Village, Hefeng Village, Huangping Village, Diche Village, Gaoshui Village, Gaoying Village, Chagan Village, Yingfeng Village, Sanxing Village, Sanda Village, Qiaoxia Village, and Xinhu Village.
