= Hukou Station =

Hukou station may refer to:

- Hukou station, a station of the Wuhan Metro
- Hukou railway station, a railway station of the Taiwan Railways Administration West Coast line
- Hukou railway station (Jiangxi), a railway station in Hukou County, Jiujiang, Jiangxi, China
