= Chaling County =

Chaling County 茶陵县
- County
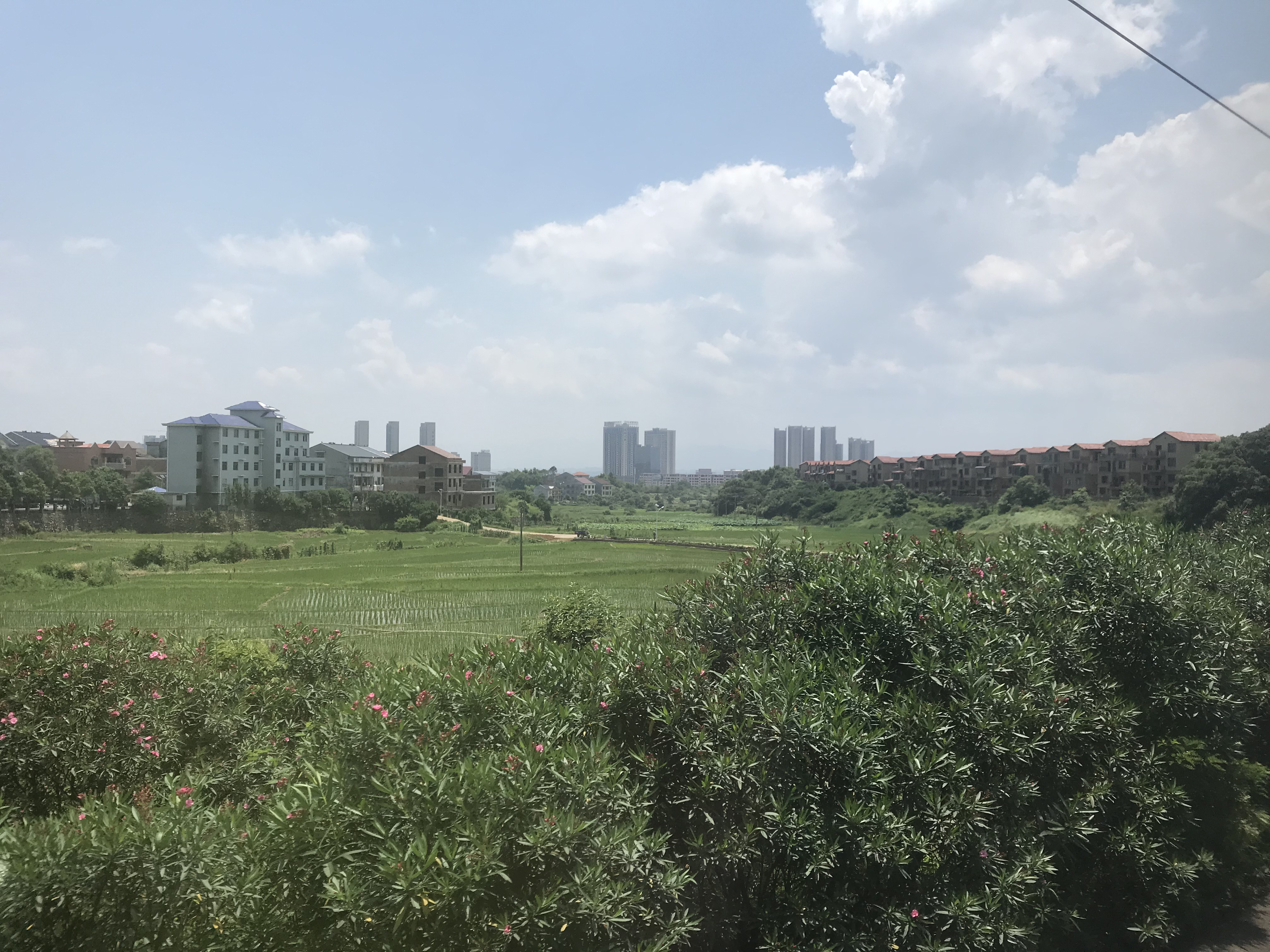

- Location in Hunan
- Coordinates: 26°48′50″N 113°38′28″E
- Country: People's Republic of China
- Province: Hunan
- Prefecture-level city: Zhuzhou
- Seat: Yunyang Subdistrict
- Time zone: UTC+8 (China Standard)

Chaling County (simplified Chinese: 茶陵县; traditional Chinese: 茶陵縣; pinyin: Chálíng Xiàn; lit. 'tea hill') is a county in Hunan Province, China, under the administration of Zhuzhou City. Located on the south eastern margin of the province, the county is bordered to the north by You County, to the east by Anren County, to the south by Yanling County, and to the east by Lianhua, Yongxin Counties and Jinggangshan City of Jiangxi. Chaling County covers 2,500 km^{2} (970 sq mi), as of 2015, it had a registered population of 631,036 and resident a population of 586,000. The county has 4 subdistricts, 10 towns and 2 townships under its jurisdiction, and the county seat is at Yunyang Subdistrict (云阳街道).

== Subdivisions ==
Name	Hanzi	Population (2005)	Area (km^{2})	Note
Chengguan	城关镇	90,000	14	
Jieshou	界首镇	28,000	84	
Yantang	严塘镇	40,750	243	
Hukou	湖口镇	34,000	72.7	
Huanxi	浣溪镇	16,000	136	
Majiang	马江镇	33,000	85	
Gaolong	高陇镇	19,500	140.66	
Yaobei	腰陂镇	57,600	230	
Lushui	潞水镇	32,000	127	
Huju	虎踞镇	28,000	83	
Pingshui	平水镇	26,700	137.6	
Zaoshi	枣市镇	27,000	112.75	
Huotian	火田镇		144	
Taokeng	桃坑乡	16,200	270	
Xiadong	下东乡	17,200	31.9	
Lingfang	舲舫乡	29,100	87.4	
Sicong	思聪乡	30,200	41.2	
Mijiang	洣江街道	26,670	41.2	
Batuan	八团乡	65,000	116	
Zhitang	秩堂乡	26,000	163	

In the present, Chaling County has 4 subdistricts, 10 towns and 2 townships.

4 subdistricts

- Mijiang (洣江街道)
- Sicong (思聪街道)
- Xiadong (下东街道)
- Yunyang (云阳街道)

10 towns

- Gaolong (高陇镇)
- Huju (虎踞镇)
- Hukou (湖口镇)
- Huotian (火田镇)
- Jieshou (界首镇)
- Majiang (马江镇)
- Yantang (严塘镇)
- Yaolu (腰潞镇)
- Zaoshi (枣市镇)
- Zhitang (秩堂镇)

2 towns

- Lingfang (舲舫乡)
- Taokeng (桃坑乡)

== Climate ==
Climate data for Chaling, elevation 136 m (446 ft), (1991–2020 normals, extremes 1981–2010)
Month	Jan	Feb	Mar	Apr	May	Jun	Jul	Aug	Sep	Oct	Nov	Dec	Year
Record high °C (°F)	26.3 (79.3)	31.7 (89.1)	35.2 (95.4)	35.9 (96.6)	36.6 (97.9)	38.0 (100.4)	40.2 (104.4)	40.7 (105.3)	38.4 (101.1)	36.1 (97.0)	32.5 (90.5)	25.6 (78.1)	40.7 (105.3)
Mean daily maximum °C (°F)	10.0 (50.0)	13.0 (55.4)	16.9 (62.4)	23.6 (74.5)	28.0 (82.4)	31.1 (88.0)	34.5 (94.1)	33.5 (92.3)	29.9 (85.8)	24.9 (76.8)	19.0 (66.2)	13.0 (55.4)	23.1 (73.6)
Daily mean °C (°F)	6.5 (43.7)	9.0 (48.2)	12.7 (54.9)	18.7 (65.7)	23.2 (73.8)	26.5 (79.7)	29.2 (84.6)	28.4 (83.1)	25.1 (77.2)	20.0 (68.0)	14.3 (57.7)	8.8 (47.8)	18.5 (65.4)
Mean daily minimum °C (°F)	4.0 (39.2)	6.2 (43.2)	9.8 (49.6)	15.2 (59.4)	19.7 (67.5)	23.3 (73.9)	25.3 (77.5)	24.8 (76.6)	21.6 (70.9)	16.5 (61.7)	10.9 (51.6)	5.7 (42.3)	15.3 (59.5)
Record low °C (°F)	−4.2 (24.4)	−3.9 (25.0)	−1.4 (29.5)	3.7 (38.7)	9.8 (49.6)	13.9 (57.0)	18.4 (65.1)	18.2 (64.8)	13.2 (55.8)	4.6 (40.3)	−0.6 (30.9)	−7.5 (18.5)	−7.5 (18.5)
Average precipitation mm (inches)	77.2 (3.04)	87.1 (3.43)	178.0 (7.01)	166.9 (6.57)	202.1 (7.96)	235.3 (9.26)	133.8 (5.27)	146.2 (5.76)	66.8 (2.63)	59.7 (2.35)	80.1 (3.15)	56.8 (2.24)	1,490 (58.67)
Average precipitation days (≥ 0.1 mm)	14.0	13.6	18.3	17.0	16.7	14.5	11.4	12.3	8.8	7.6	9.8	10.2	154.2
Average snowy days	2.9	1.4	0.3	0	0	0	0	0	0	0	0.1	0.8	5.5
Average relative humidity (%)	80	80	82	80	79	80	74	76	76	73	75	75	78
Mean monthly sunshine hours	64.4	68.3	75.3	112.0	142.3	156.7	243.7	215.3	173.4	148.7	122.6	109.0	1,631.7
Percentage possible sunshine	19	22	20	29	34	38	58	54	47	42	38	34	36
Source: China Meteorological Administration
