= Fan Kuai =

General of Han Dynasty of China

- 樊噲
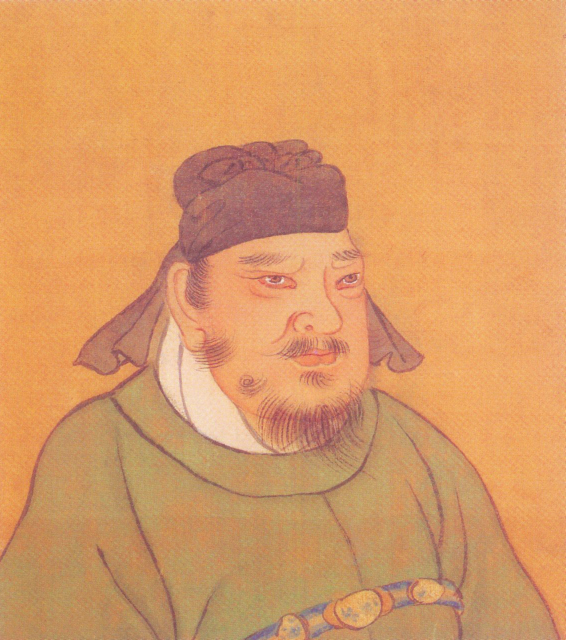
- A Ming dynasty illustration of Fan Kuai

Personal details
- Born: 242 BC? Feng County, Jiangsu
- Died: 189 BC
- Spouse: Lü Xu
- Children: Fan Kang; Fan Shiren; one daughter
- Occupation: General
- Posthumous name: Marquis Wu (武侯)
- Peerage: Marquis of Wuyang (舞陽侯)

Fan Kuai (242? – c.July 189 BC) was a Chinese military general of the early Western Han dynasty. He was a prominent figure of the Chu–Han Contention (206–202 BC), a power struggle for supremacy over China between the Han dynasty's founder, Liu Bang, and his rival Xiang Yu.

== Early life ==
Fan Kuai was a close friend of Liu Bang, and both were from the same hometown of Pei County (present-day Feng County, Jiangsu). In his early days, he was a butcher specialized in preparing dog meat. He married Lü Xu, the younger sister of Liu Bang's wife Lü Zhi, making him an extended kin of the Liu family (later the royal family of Han dynasty) via affinity.

== Rebelling against the Qin dynasty ==
Once, Liu Bang released the prisoners he was escorting and became an outlaw on Mount Mangdang (in present-day Yongcheng, Henan). Following the Dazexiang Uprising in 209 BC, the magistrate of Pei County also wanted to rebel so he heeded Xiao He and Cao Shen's advice, and sent Fan Kuai to Mount Mangdang to invite Liu Bang and his men back to help him. However, the magistrate changed his mind later and denied Liu Bang entry into the city. The citizens responded to Liu Bang's call and killed the magistrate, allowing Liu and his men to return home. Liu Bang was then known as "Duke of Pei" and Fan Kuai served as one of his close aides and bodyguards. Fan Kuai distinguished himself on the battlefield as a mighty warrior and capable general. He fought in many battles on Liu Bang's side and claimed the heads of enemies in increasing order in each battle, and was rewarded with promotions to higher ranks each time.

== Chu–Han contention ==
=== Feast at Hong Gate ===
Fan Kuai is best known for defending Liu Bang at the Feast at Hong Gate, which was actually a trap set to kill Liu. He rushed to Liu Bang's defence when he heard that Xiang Yu's advisor Fan Zeng intended to have Liu killed. Fan Kuai chided Xiang Yu openly, making a speech about Liu Bang's accomplishments and stating that it would be unjust for Xiang to kill Liu. Xiang Yu was impressed by Fan Kuai's bravery and offered him a seat at the feast. Liu Bang escaped from the feast later on the pretext of going to the latrine, with Fan Kuai accompanying him.

After the fall of the Qin dynasty, Xiang Yu divided the former Qin Empire into the Eighteen Kingdoms, appointed Liu Bang as "King of Han" with the lands of Shu as his fiefdom. Liu Bang seized the lands of the Three Qins and engaged in a long power struggle with Xiang Yu for supremacy over China, historically known as the Chu–Han Contention. Fan Kuai participated actively in many of the battles between the two contending forces and became famous for his prowess in battle.

== Service during the Han dynasty ==
After the establishment of the Han dynasty, Emperor Gao (Liu Bang) enfeoffed Fan Kuai as the Marquis of Wuyang (舞陽侯) in recognition of Fan's contributions to the dynasty's founding. After Fan Kuai's death, he was posthumously conferred the title "Marquis Wu" (武侯) while his son Fan Kang inherited his title of "Marquis of Wuyang". Fan Kuai's wife Lü Xu was put to death in the aftermath of the Lü Clan Disturbance in 180 BC and Fan Kang was killed as well. Several months later, Emperor Wen conferred the title on Fan Shiren, another son of Fan Kuai who was not born to Lü Xu.

== Modern references ==
In Chinese folk religion, Fan Kuai is sometimes regarded as a patron deity of butchers. In the action RPG Prince of Qin, Fan Kuai appears as a non-playable character and the player can find out Liu Bang's whereabouts from him.

His direct descendants still live in Pei County (沛县), the hometown of Fan Kuai, well known in the locale for their traditional Chinese medical skills. Fan Lei (樊蕾), performed a good role in contemporary Chinese Visual Art, and education on Gongbi, extend the good tradition of the Chinese culture.

== In popular culture ==
In Romance of the Three Kingdoms, Xu Chu, the general and guard of Cao Cao, was known as the "Tiger Warrior" (虎士). Cao Cao claimed, "This man is my Fan Kuai!" Fan Kuai is the epitome of a brave guard.
