= Sima Qian =

Chinese historian (c. 145 – c. 86 BCE)

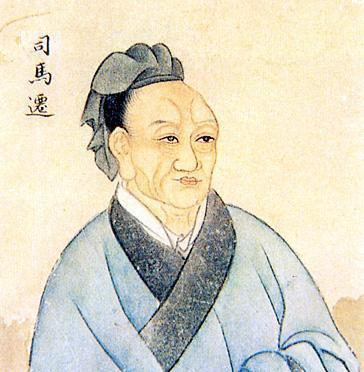
- Born: c. 145 BC; Longmen, Han dynasty (now Hancheng, Shaanxi)
- Died: c. 86 BC
- Occupations: Historian; astronomer; astrologer; poet
- Known for: Shiji
- Relatives: Sima Tan (father)

Chinese name
- Traditional Chinese: 司馬遷
- Simplified Chinese: 司马迁
Transcriptions
Standard Mandarin
- Hanyu Pinyin: Sīmǎ Qiān
- Bopomofo: ㄙ ㄇㄚˇ ㄑㄧㄢ
- Wade–Giles: Ssŭ^{1}-ma^{3} Ch'ien^{1}
- IPA: [sɹ̩́.mà tɕʰjɛ́n]
Yue: Cantonese
- Yale Romanization: Sī-máh Chīn
- Jyutping: Si1 maa5 Cin1
- IPA: [si˥.ma˩˧ tsʰin˥]
Southern Min
- Hokkien POJ: Su-má Chhian
- Tâi-lô: Su-má Tshian
Middle Chinese
- Middle Chinese: Sɨ-mæ^{X} Tshjen
Old Chinese
- Baxter–Sagart (2014): *s-lə mˤraʔ [tsʰ]ar

Courtesy name
- Traditional Chinese: 子長
- Simplified Chinese: 子长
Transcriptions
Standard Mandarin
- Hanyu Pinyin: Zǐzhǎng
- Bopomofo: ㄗˇ ㄓㄤˇ
- Wade–Giles: Tzu^{3}-chang^{3}
- IPA: [tsɹ̩̀.ʈʂàŋ]
Yue: Cantonese
- Yale Romanization: Jí-jéung
- Jyutping: Zi2 zoeng2
- IPA: [tsi˧˥.tsœŋ˧˥]
Southern Min
- Hokkien POJ: Tzú-tiúnn
Middle Chinese
- Middle Chinese: Tsɨ^{X}-drɨang
Old Chinese
- Baxter–Sagart (2014): *tsəʔ Cə-[N]-traŋ

Sima Qian (c. 145 BC – c. 86 BC) was a Chinese historian during the early Han dynasty. He is considered the father of Chinese historiography for the Shiji (sometimes translated into English as Records of the Grand Historian), a general history of China covering more than two thousand years from the rise of the legendary Yellow Emperor and formation of the first Chinese polity to the reign of Emperor Wu of Han, during which Sima wrote. As the first universal history of the world as it was known to the ancient Chinese, the Shiji served as a model for official histories for subsequent dynasties across the Sinosphere until the 20th century.

Sima Qian's father, Sima Tan, first conceived of the ambitious project of writing a complete history of China, but had completed only some preparatory sketches at the time of his death. After inheriting his father's position as court historian in the imperial court, he was determined to fulfill his father's dying wish of composing and putting together this epic work of history.

However, in 99 BC, he offended Emperor Wu by speaking in defense of the general Li Ling, whom Emperor Wu blamed for surrendering after an unsuccessful campaign against the Xiongnu. Given the choice of being executed or castrated, Sima chose the latter in order to finish his historical work. Although he is universally remembered for the Records, surviving works indicate that he was also a gifted poet and prose writer, and he was instrumental in the creation of the Taichu calendar, which was officially promulgated in 104 BC.

Sima was acutely aware of the importance of his work to posterity and its relationship to his own personal suffering. In the postface of the Records, he implicitly compared his universal history of China to the classics of his day, the Guoyu by Zuo Qiuming, "Li Sao" by Qu Yuan, and the Art of War by Sun Bin, pointing out that their authors all suffered great personal misfortunes before their lasting monumental works could come to fruition. Sima Qian is also depicted in the Wu Shuang Pu by Jin Guliang.

== Early life and education ==
Sima Qian was born at Xiayang in Zuopingyi (near present-day Hancheng, Shaanxi). He was probably born around 145 BC, although some sources say he was born about 135 BC. Around 136 BC, his father Sima Tan was appointed to the position of "grand historian" (tàishǐ 太史, alternatively "grand scribe" or "grand astrologer") at the imperial court. The grand historian was a relatively low-ranking official whose main duty was to formulate the yearly calendar, identifying which days were ritually auspicious or inauspicious, and present it to the emperor prior to the new year. His other duties included traveling with the emperor for important rituals and recording daily events both at the court and around the country. By his account, by the age of ten Sima was able to "read the old writings" and was considered to be a promising scholar. Sima grew up in a Confucian environment, and Sima always regarded his historical work as an act of Confucian filial piety.

In 126 BC, around the age of 20, Sima Qian began an extensive tour around China as it existed in the Han dynasty. He started his journey from the imperial capital, Chang'an (modern Xi'an), then went south across the Yangtze to Changsha Kingdom (modern Hunan), where he visited the Miluo River site where the Warring States–era poet Qu Yuan was traditionally said to have drowned himself. He then went to seek the burial place of the legendary rulers Yu the Great on Mount Xianglu and Shun in the Jiuyi Mountains (modern Ningyuan County, Hunan). He then went north to Huaiyin (modern Huai'an, Jiangsu) to see the grave of Han dynasty general Han Xin, then continued north to Qufu, the hometown of Confucius, where he studied ritual and other traditional subjects.

== As Han court official ==
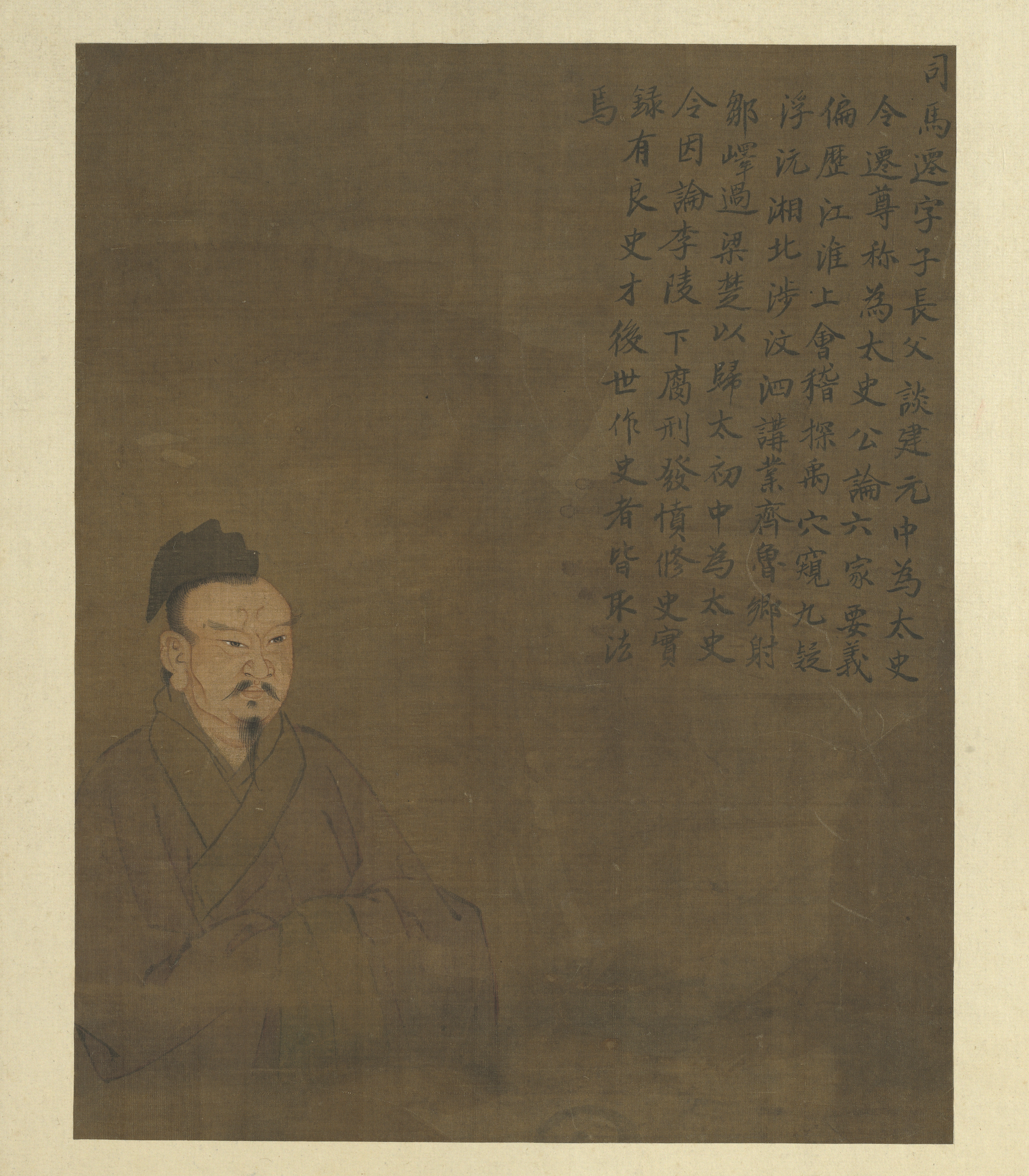
Portrait of Sima Qian (National Palace Museum)

After his travels, Sima was chosen to be a Palace Attendant in the government, whose duties were to inspect different parts of the country with Emperor Wu in 122 BC. Sima married young and had one daughter. In 110 BC, at the age of 35, Sima Qian was sent westward on a military expedition against some "barbarian" tribes. That year, his father fell ill due to the distress of not being invited to attend the Imperial Feng Sacrifice. Suspecting that his time was running out, he summoned his son back home to take over the historical work he had begun. Sima Tan wanted to follow the Spring and Autumn Annals, the first chronicle in the history of Chinese literature.

It appears that Sima Tan was only able to put together an outline of the work before he died. The postface of the completed Shiji, there is a short essay on the six philosophical schools that is explicitly attributed to Sima Tan. Otherwise, there are only fragments of the Shiji that are speculated to be authored by Sima Tan or based on his notes. Fueled by his father's inspiration, Sima Qian spent much of the subsequent decade authoring and compiling the Shiji (sometimes translated into English as Records of the Grand Historian) and completed it before 91 BC, probably around 94 BC. Three years after the death of his father, Sima Qian assumed his father's previous position as taishi. In 105 BC, Sima was among the scholars chosen to reform the calendar. As a senior imperial official, Sima was also in the position to offer counsel to the emperor on general affairs of state.

=== Li Ling affair ===
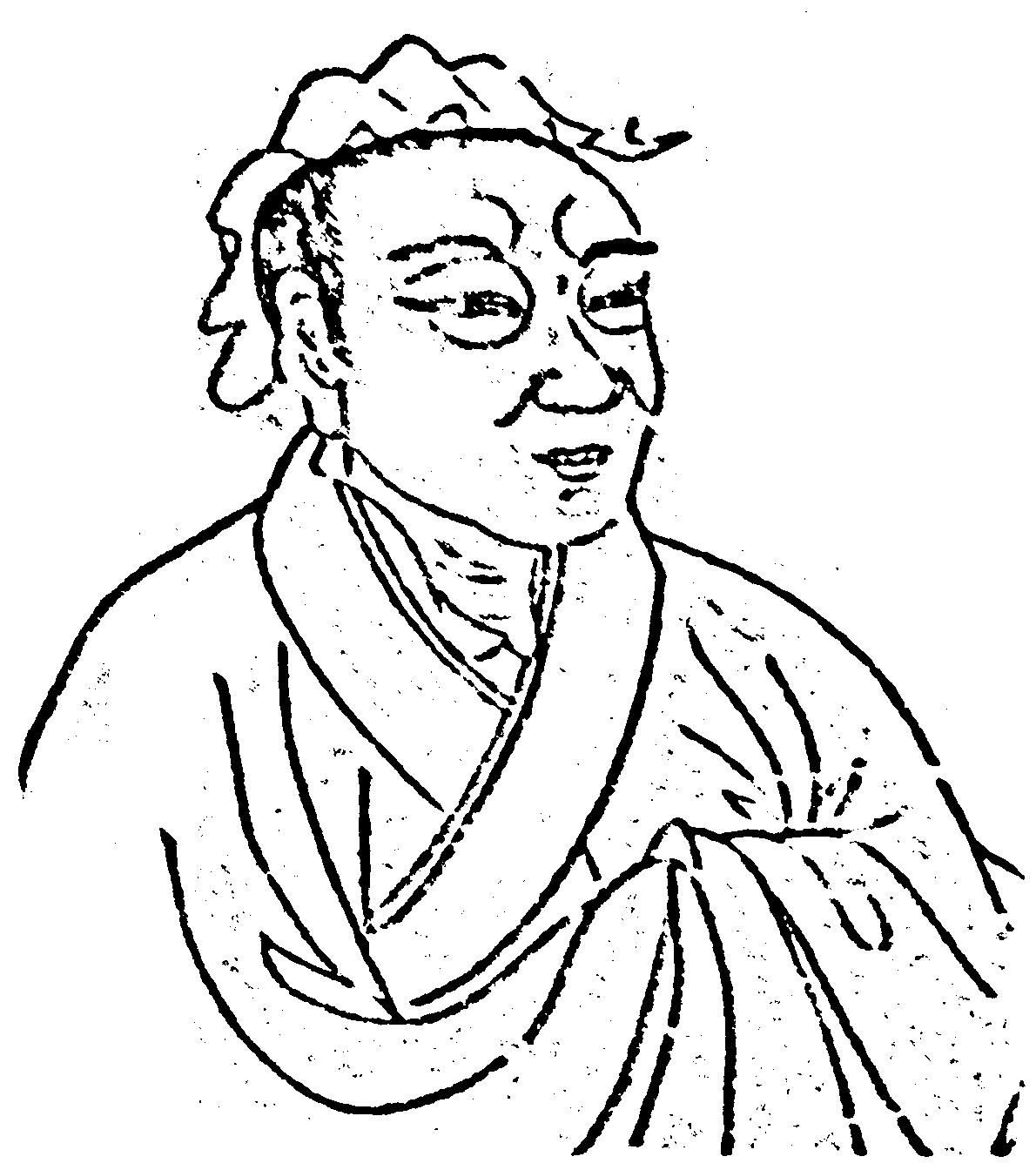
A Ming period (1368–1644) portrait of Sima Qian

In 99 BC, Sima became embroiled in the Li Ling affair, where Li Ling and Li Guangli, two military officers who led a campaign against the Xiongnu in the north, were defeated and taken captive. Emperor Wu attributed the defeat to Li Ling, with all government officials subsequently condemning him for it. Sima was the only person to defend Li Ling, who had never been his friend but whom he respected. Emperor Wu interpreted Sima's defence of Li as an attack on his brother-in-law, Li Guangli, who had also fought against the Xiongnu without much success, and sentenced Sima to death. At that time, execution could be commuted either by money or castration. Since Sima did not have enough money to atone for his "crime", he chose the latter and was then thrown into prison, where he endured three years. He described his pain thus: "When you see the jailer you abjectly touch the ground with your forehead. At the mere sight of his underlings you are seized with terror ... Such ignominy can never be wiped away." Sima called his castration "the worst of all punishments".

In 96 BC, on his release from prison, Sima chose to live on as a palace eunuch to complete his histories, rather than commit suicide as was expected of a gentleman-scholar who had been disgraced by being castrated. As Sima Qian himself explained in his Letter to Ren An:

且夫臧獲婢妾猶能引決，況若僕之不得已乎。所以隱忍苟活，函糞土之中而不辭者，恨私心有所不盡，鄙沒世而文采不表於後也。古者富貴而名摩滅，不可勝記，唯俶儻非常之人稱焉。
If even the lowest slave and scullion maid can bear to commit suicide, why should not one like myself be able to do what has to be done? But the reason I have not refused to bear these ills and have continued to live, dwelling in vileness and disgrace without taking my leave, is that I grieve that I have things in my heart which I have not been able to express fully, and I am shamed to think that after I am gone my writings will not be known to posterity. Too numerous to record are the men of ancient times who were rich and noble and whose names have yet vanished away. It is only those who were masterful and sure, the truly extraordinary men, who are still remembered.

僕竊不遜，近自託於無能之辭，網羅天下放失舊聞，考之行事，綜其終始，稽其成敗興壞之理 ... 凡百三十篇，亦欲以究天人之際，通古今之變，成一家之言。草創未就，適會此禍，惜其不成，是以就極刑而無慍色。僕誠已著此書，藏諸名山，傳之其人通邑大都，則僕償前辱之責，雖萬被戮，豈有悔哉！
I too have ventured not to be modest but have entrusted myself to my useless writings. I have gathered up and brought together the old traditions of the world which were scattered and lost. I have examined the deeds and events of the past and investigated the principles behind their success and failure, their rise and decay [...] in one hundred and thirty chapters. I wished to examine into all that concerns heaven and man, to penetrate the changes of the past and present, completing all as the work of one family. But before I had finished my rough manuscript, I met with this calamity. It is because I regretted that it had not been completed that I submitted to the extreme penalty without rancor. When I have truly completed this work, I shall deposit it in the Famous Mountain. If it may be handed down to men who will appreciate it, and penetrate to the villages and great cities, then though I should suffer a thousand mutilations, what regret should I have?

— Sima Qian, "Letter to Ren An" (96 BC; Burton Watson, trans.)

=== Later years and death ===
Upon his release from prison in 97/96 BC, Sima Qian continued to serve in the Han court as zhongshuling (中書令), a court archivist position reserved for eunuchs with considerable status and with higher pay than his previous position of historian.

The Letter to Ren An was written by Sima Qian in reply to Ren An in response to the latter's involvement in Crown Prince Liu Ju's rebellion in 91 BC. This is the last record of Sima Qian in contemporary documents. The letter is a reply to a lost letter by Ren An to Sima Qian, perhaps asking Sima Qian to intercede on his behalf as Ren An was facing execution for accusations of being an opportunist and displaying equivocal loyalty to the emperor during the rebellion. In his reply, Sima Qian stated that he is a mutilated man with no influence at court. Some later historians claimed that Sima Qian himself became implicated in the rebellion as a result of his friendship with Ren An and was executed as part of the purge of the crown prince's supporters in court; however, the earliest-attested record of this account dates from the 4th century. Moreover, it has also been pointed out that Sima Qian would have been reluctant to render substantive aid to Ren An, given the severe consequences that he suffered for supporting General Li Ling, as well as Ren An's failure to act on his behalf during the Li Ling affair. Although there are many theories regarding the exact dating as well as the true nature and purpose of the Letter to Ren An, one common interpretation suggests that the letter, in part, tacitly expressed a refusal to play an active role in securing a reduced punishment for Ren An.

The early-20th-century scholar Wang Guowei stated that there are no reliable records establishing when Sima Qian died. He and most modern historians believe that Sima Qian spent his last days as a scholar in reclusion (隱士; yǐnshì) after leaving the Han court, perhaps dying around the same time as Emperor Wu in 87/86 BC. (Note: Wang Guowei: "絕不可考......然視為與武帝相終始，當無大誤。" (It [when Sima Qian died] absolutely cannot be determined. However, it should not be a great mistake if one viewed Sima Qian as beginning and ending with Emperor Wu [of Han].))

== Shiji ==
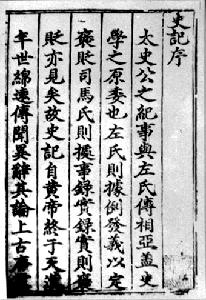
The first page of the Shiji

=== Format ===
The Shiji totals over 500,000 characters in length, organized into 130 chapters. While the style and form of Chinese historiography was not static over time, the Shiji created a permanent standard for quality and style for later scholars. Before Sima, histories focused on recounting particular events or the affairs of a specific region; his idea of a general history guided later historiographers, like Sima Guang and Zheng Qiao (鄭樵), authors of the Zizhi Tongjian (1084) and Tongzhi (1161) respectively. While the traditional format by which official histories would be organized was codified later by Ban Gu in the Book of Han (111 AD), historians consider the Shiji to have informed Ban's work.

The jizhuanti (紀傳體) format divides a work into several different types of chapters, most prominently 'basic annals' (本紀; benji) and 'ordered biographies' (列傳; liezhuan). Benji contain biographies for each sovereign, ordered chronologically and organized by dynasty; liezhuan contain biographies of influential individuals outside the nobility, sometimes for one prominent individual, but often for two or more people who, in Sima's judgment, played comparably important roles. In addition to these namesake categories, there are chapters falling under the categories of 'tables' (表; biao) collating graphical chronologies of royalty and nobility, and 'treatises' (書; shu) giving historical accounts of topics like music, ritual, or economics. Most importantly, the 'house chronicles' (世家; shijia) document important events during each ruler's reign for each state within the Zhou dynasty, as well as histories of the noble houses established during the Han.

The Shiji includes 12 basic annals, 10 tables, 8 treatises, 30 house chronicles, and 70 ordered biographies; with the final ordered biography serving as the postface. This final chapter details the background of how the Shiji was composed and compiled, and gives brief justifications for the inclusion of the major topics, events, and individuals in the work. As part of the background, the postface provides a short sketch of the history of the Sima clan, from legendary times to his father Sima Tan. It also details the dying words of Sima Tan, tearfully exhorting the author to compose the present work, and contains a biographical sketch of the author himself. The postface concludes with a self-referential description of the postface as the 70th and last of the Ordered Biographies chapters.

=== Influences and legacy ===
Sima was greatly influenced by Confucius's Spring and Autumn Annals, which on the surface is a succinct chronology from the events of the reigns of the twelve dukes of Lu from 722 to 484 BC. Many Chinese scholars have and still do view how Confucius ordered his chronology as the ideal example of how history should be written, especially with regards to what he chose to include and to exclude, and his choice of words as indicating moral judgments. Seen in this light, the Spring and Autumn Annals are a moral guide to the proper way of living. Sima took this view himself as he explained:

夫春秋 ... 別嫌疑，明是非，定猶豫，善善惡惡，賢賢賤不肖，存亡國，繼絕世，補敝起廢。
It [Spring and Autumn Annals] distinguishes what is suspicious and doubtful, clarifies right and wrong, and settles points which are uncertain. It calls good good and bad bad, honours the worthy, and condemns the unworthy. It preserves states which are lost and restores the perishing family. It brings to light what was neglected and restores what was abandoned.

Sima saw the Shiji as belonging to the same tradition, as he explained in the introduction to chapter 61:

或曰：天道無親，常與善人。若伯夷、叔齊，可謂善人者非邪。積仁絜行如此而餓死。... 盜蹠日殺不辜，肝人之肉 ... 竟以壽終。是遵何德哉。 ... 余甚惑焉，儻所謂天道，是邪非邪。
Some people say "It is Heaven's way, without distinction of persons, to keep the good perpetually supplied." Can we say then that Boyi and Shuqi were good men or not? They clung to righteousness and were pure in their deeds yet they starved to death ... Robber Zhi day after day killed innocent men, making mincemeat of their flesh ... But in the end he lived to a great old age. For what virtue did he deserve this? ... I find myself in much perplexity. Is this so-called "Way of Heaven" right or wrong?

To resolve this theodical problem, Sima argued that while the wicked may succeed and the good may suffer in their own life-times, it is the historian who ensures that in the end good triumphs. For Sima, the writing of history was no mere antiquarian pursuit, but was rather a vital moral task as the historian would "preserve memory", and thereby ensure the ultimate victory of good over evil. Sima wrote:

蘇秦兄弟三人，皆游說諸侯以顯名，其術長於權變。而蘇秦被反閒以死，天下共笑之，諱學其術。 ... 夫蘇秦起閭閻，連六國從親，此其智有過人者。吾故列其行事，次其時序，毋令獨蒙惡聲焉。
Su Qin and his two brothers all achieved fame among the feudal lords as itinerant strategists. Their policies laid great stress upon stratagems and shifts of power. But because Su Qin died a traitor's death, the world has united in scoffing at him and has been loath to study his policies ... Su Qin arose from the humblest beginnings to lead the Six States in the Vertical Alliance, and this is evidence that he possessed an intelligence surpassing the ordinary person. For this reason I have set forth this account of his deeds, arranging them in proper chronological order, so that he may not forever suffer from an evil reputation and be known for nothing else.

Such a moralizing approach to history with the historian high-guiding the good and evil to provide lessons for the present could be dangerous for the historian as it could bring down the wrath of the state onto the historian as happened to Sima himself. As such, the historian had to tread carefully and often expressed his judgements in a circuitous way designed to fool the censor.

Sima himself stated he was writing in this tradition in the conclusion to chapter 110, writing:

孔氏著春秋，隱桓之閒則章，至定哀之際則微，為其切當世之文而罔褒，忌諱之辭也。
When Confucius wrote the Spring and Autumn Annals, he was very open in treating the reigns of Yin and Huan, the early dukes of Lu; but when he came to the later period of Dukes Ding and Ai, his writing was much more covert. Because in the latter case he was writing about his own times, he did not express his judgements frankly, but used subtle and guarded language.

Bearing this in mind, not everything that Sima wrote should be understood as conveying didactic moral lessons. But several historians have suggested that parts of the Shiji, such as where Sima placed his section on Confucius's use of indirect criticism in the part of the book dealing with the Xiongnu "barbarians" might indicate his disapproval of the foreign policy of the Emperor Wu.

In writing the Shiji, Sima initiated a new writing style by presenting history in a series of biographies. His work extends over 130 chapters—not in historical sequence, but divided into particular subjects, including annals, chronicles, and treatises—on music, ceremonies, calendars, religion, economics, and extended biographies. Sima's work influenced the writing style of other histories outside of China as well, such as the Korean Samguk sagi. Sima adopted a new method in sorting out the historical data and a new approach to writing historical records. At the beginning of the Shiji, Sima declared himself a follower of Confucius's approach in the Analects to "hear much but leave to one side that which is doubtful, and speak with due caution concerning the remainder". Reflecting these rigorous analytic methods, Sima declared that he would not write about periods of history where there was insufficient documentation. As such, Sima wrote "the ages before the Ch'in dynasty are too far away and the material on them too scanty to permit a detailed account of them here". In the same way, Sima discounted accounts in the traditional records that were "ridiculous" such as the pretense that Prince Tan could via the use of magic make the clouds rain grain and horses grow horns. Sima constantly compared accounts found in the manuscripts with what he considered reliable sources like Confucian classics like the Classic of Poetry, Book of Documents, Book of Rites, Classic of Music, I Ching and Spring and Autumn Annals. When Sima encountered a story that could not be cross-checked with the Confucian classics, he systemically compared the information with other documents. Sima mentioned at least 75 books he used for cross-checking. Furthermore, Sima often questioned people about historical events they had experienced. Sima mentioned after one of his trips across China that: "When I had occasion to pass through Feng and Beiyi I questioned the elderly people who were about the place, visited the old home of Xiao He, Cao Can, Fan Kuai and Xiahou Ying, and learned much about the early days. How different it was from the stories one hears!" Reflecting the traditional Chinese reverence for age, Sima stated that he preferred to interview the elderly as he believed that they were the most likely to supply him with correct and truthful information about what had happened in the past. During one of this trips, Sima mentioned that he was overcome with emotion when he saw the carriage of Confucius together with his clothes and various other personal items that had belonged to Confucius.

=== Innovations and unique features ===
Despite his very large debts to Confucian tradition, Sima was an innovator in four ways. To begin with, Sima's work was concerned with the history of the known world. Previous Chinese historians had focused on only one dynasty and/or region. Sima's history of 130 chapters began with the legendary Yellow Emperor and extended to his own time, and covered not only China, but also neighboring nations like Korea and Vietnam. In this regard, Sima was significant as the first Chinese historian to treat the peoples living to the north of the Great Wall like the Xiongnu as human beings who were implicitly the equals of the Middle Kingdom, instead of the traditional approach which had portrayed the Xiongnu as savages who had the appearance of humans, but the minds of animals. In his comments about the Xiongnu, Sima refrained from evoking claims about the innate moral superiority of the Han over the "northern barbarians" that were the standard rhetorical tropes of Chinese historians in this period. Likewise, Sima in his chapter about the Xiongnu condemns those advisors who pursue the "expediency of the moment", that is advise the Emperor to carry policies such as conquests of other nations that bring a brief moment of glory, but burden the state with the enormous financial and often human costs of holding on to the conquered land. Sima was engaging in an indirect criticism of the advisors of the Emperor Wu who were urging him to pursue a policy of aggression towards the Xiongnu and conquer all their land, a policy to which Sima was apparently opposed.

Sima also broke new ground by using more sources like interviewing witnesses, visiting places where historical occurrences had happened, and examining documents from different regions and/or times. Before Chinese historians had tended to use only reign histories as their sources. The Shiji was further very novel in Chinese historiography by examining historical events outside of the courts, providing a broader history than the traditional court-based histories had done. Lastly, Sima broke with the traditional chronological structure of Chinese history. Sima instead had divided the Shiji into five divisions: the basic annals which comprised the first 12 chapters, the chronological tables which comprised the next 10 chapters, treatises on particular subjects which make up 8 chapters, accounts of the ruling families which take up 30 chapters, and biographies of various eminent people which are the last 70 chapters. The annals follow the traditional Chinese pattern of court-based histories of the lives of various emperors and their families. The chronological tables are graphs recounting the political history of China. The treatises are essays on topics such as astronomy, music, religion, hydraulic engineering and economics. The last section dealing with biographies covers individuals judged by Sima to have made a major impact on the course of history, regardless of whether they were of noble or humble birth and whether they were born in the central states, the periphery, or barbarian lands. Unlike traditional Chinese historians, Sima went beyond the androcentric, nobility-focused histories by dealing with the lives of women and men such as poets, bureaucrats, merchants, comedians/jesters, assassins, and philosophers. The treatises section, the biographies sections and the annals section relating to the Qin dynasty (as a former dynasty, there was more freedom to write about the Qin than there was about the reigning Han dynasty) that make up 40% of the Shiji have aroused the most interest from historians and are the only parts of the Shiji that have been translated into English.

When Sima placed his subjects was often his way of expressing obliquely moral judgements. Empress Lü and Xiang Yu were the effective rulers of China during reigns Hui of the Han and Yi of Chu, respectively, so Sima placed both their lives in the basic annals. Likewise, Confucius is included in the fourth section rather the fifth where he properly belonged as a way of showing his eminent virtue. The structure of the Shiji allowed Sima to tell the same stories in different ways, which allowed him to pass his moral judgements. For example, in the basic annals section, the Emperor Gaozu is portrayed as a good leader whereas in the section dealing with his rival Xiang Yu, the Emperor is portrayed unflatteringly. Likewise, the chapter on Xiang presents him in a favorable light whereas the chapter on Gaozu portrays him in more darker colors. At the end of most of the chapters, Sima usually wrote a commentary in which he judged how the individual lived up to traditional Chinese values like filial piety, humility, self-discipline, hard work and concern for the less fortunate. Sima analyzed the records and sorted out those that could serve the purpose of Shiji. He intended to discover the patterns and principles of the development of human history. Sima also emphasized, for the first time in Chinese history, the role of individual men in affecting the historical development of China and his historical perception that a country cannot escape from the fate of growth and decay.

Unlike the Book of Han, which was written under the supervision of the imperial dynasty, Shiji was a privately written history since he refused to write Shiji as an official history covering only those of high rank. The work also covers people of the lower classes and is therefore considered a "veritable record" of the darker side of the dynasty. In Sima's time, literature and history were not seen as separate disciplines as they are now, and Sima wrote his magnum opus in a very literary style, making extensive use of irony, sarcasm, juxtaposition of events, characterization, direct speech and invented speeches, which led the American historian Jennifer Jay to describe parts of the Shiji as reading more like a historical novel than a work of history. For an example, Sima tells the story of a Chinese eunuch named Zhonghang Yue who became an advisor to the Xiongnu kings. Sima provides a long dialogue between Zhonghang and an envoy sent by the Emperor Wen of China during which the latter disparages the Xiongnu as "savages" whose customs are barbaric while Zhonghang defends the Xiongnu customs as either justified and/or as morally equal to Chinese customs, at times even morally superior as Zhonghang draws a contrast between the bloody succession struggles in China where family members would murder one another to be Emperor vs. the more orderly succession of the Xiongnu kings. The American historian Tamara Chin wrote that though Zhonghang did exist, the dialogue is merely a "literacy device" for Sima to make points that he could not otherwise make. The favorable picture of the traitor Zhonghang who went over to the Xiongnu who bests the Emperor's loyal envoy in an ethnographic argument about what is the morally superior nation appears to be Sima's way of attacking the entire Chinese court system where the Emperor preferred the lies told by his sycophantic advisors over the truth told by his honest advisors as inherently corrupt and depraved. The point is reinforced by the fact that Sima has Zhonghang speak the language of an idealized Confucian official whereas the Emperor's envoy's language is dismissed as "mere twittering and chatter". Elsewhere in the Shiji Sima portrayed the Xiongnu less favorably, so the debate was almost certainly more Sima's way of criticizing the Chinese court system and less genuine praise for the Xiongnu.

Sima has often been criticized for "historizing" myths and legends as he assigned dates to mythical and legendary figures from ancient Chinese history together with what appears to be suspiciously precise genealogies of leading families over the course of several millennia (including his own where he traces the descent of the Sima family from legendary emperors in the distant past). However, archaeological discoveries in recent decades have confirmed aspects of the Shiji, and suggested that even if the sections of the Shiji dealing with the ancient past are not totally true, at least Sima wrote down what he believed to be true. In particular, archaeological finds have confirmed the basic accuracy of the Shiji including the reigns and locations of tombs of ancient rulers.

== Literary figure ==
Sima's Shiji is respected as a model of biographical literature with high literary value and still stands as a textbook for the study of classical Chinese. Sima's works were influential to Chinese writing, serving as ideal models for various types of prose within the neo-classical ("renaissance" 复古) movement of the Tang–Song period. The great use of characterisation and plotting also influenced fiction writing, including the classical short stories of the middle and late medieval period (Tang-Ming) as well as the vernacular novel of the late imperial period. Sima had immense influence on historiography not only in China, but also in Japan and Korea. For centuries afterwards, the Shiji was regarded as the greatest history book written in Asia. Sima is little known in the English-speaking world as a full translation of the Shiji in English has not yet been completed.

His influence was derived primarily from the following elements of his writing: his skillful depiction of historical characters using details of their speech, conversations, and actions; his innovative use of informal, humorous, and varied language; and the simplicity and conciseness of his style. Even the 20th-century literary critic Lu Xun regarded Shiji as "the historians' most perfect song, a 'Li Sao' without the rhyme" (史家之絶唱，無韻之離騷) in his Outline of Chinese Literary History (漢文學史綱要).

=== Other literary works ===
Sima's famous letter to his friend Ren An about his sufferings during the Li Ling Affair and his perseverance in writing Shiji is today regarded as a highly admired example of literary prose style, studied widely in China even today. The Letter to Ren An contains the quote, "Men have always had but one death. For some it is as weighty as Mount Tai; for others it is as insignificant as a goose down. The difference is what they use it for." (人固有一死，或重于泰山，或輕于鴻毛，用之所趨異也。) This quote has become one of the most well known in all of Chinese literature. In modern times, Chairman Mao paraphrased this quote in a speech in which he paid tribute to a fallen PLA soldier.

Sima Qian wrote eight rhapsodies (fu), which are listed in the bibliographic treatise of the Book of Han. All but one, the "Rhapsody in Lament for Gentlemen who do not Meet their Time" (士不遇賦) have been lost, and even the surviving example is probably not complete.

== Astronomer/astrologer ==
Sima and his father both served as the taishi (太史) of the Former Han dynasty, a position which includes aspects of being a historian, a court scribe, calendarist, and court astronomer/astrologer. At that time, the astrologer had an important role, responsible for interpreting and predicting the course of government according to the influence of the Sun, Moon, and stars, as well as other astronomical and geological phenomena such as solar eclipses and earthquakes, which depended on revising and upholding an accurate calendar.

Before compiling Shiji, Sima Qian was involved in the creation of the 104 BC Taichu Calendar 太初暦 (太初 became the new era name for Emperor Wu and means "supreme beginning"), a modification of the Qin calendar. This is the first Chinese calendar whose full method of calculation (暦法) has been preserved.

The minor planet "12620 Simaqian" is named in his honour.

== Family ==
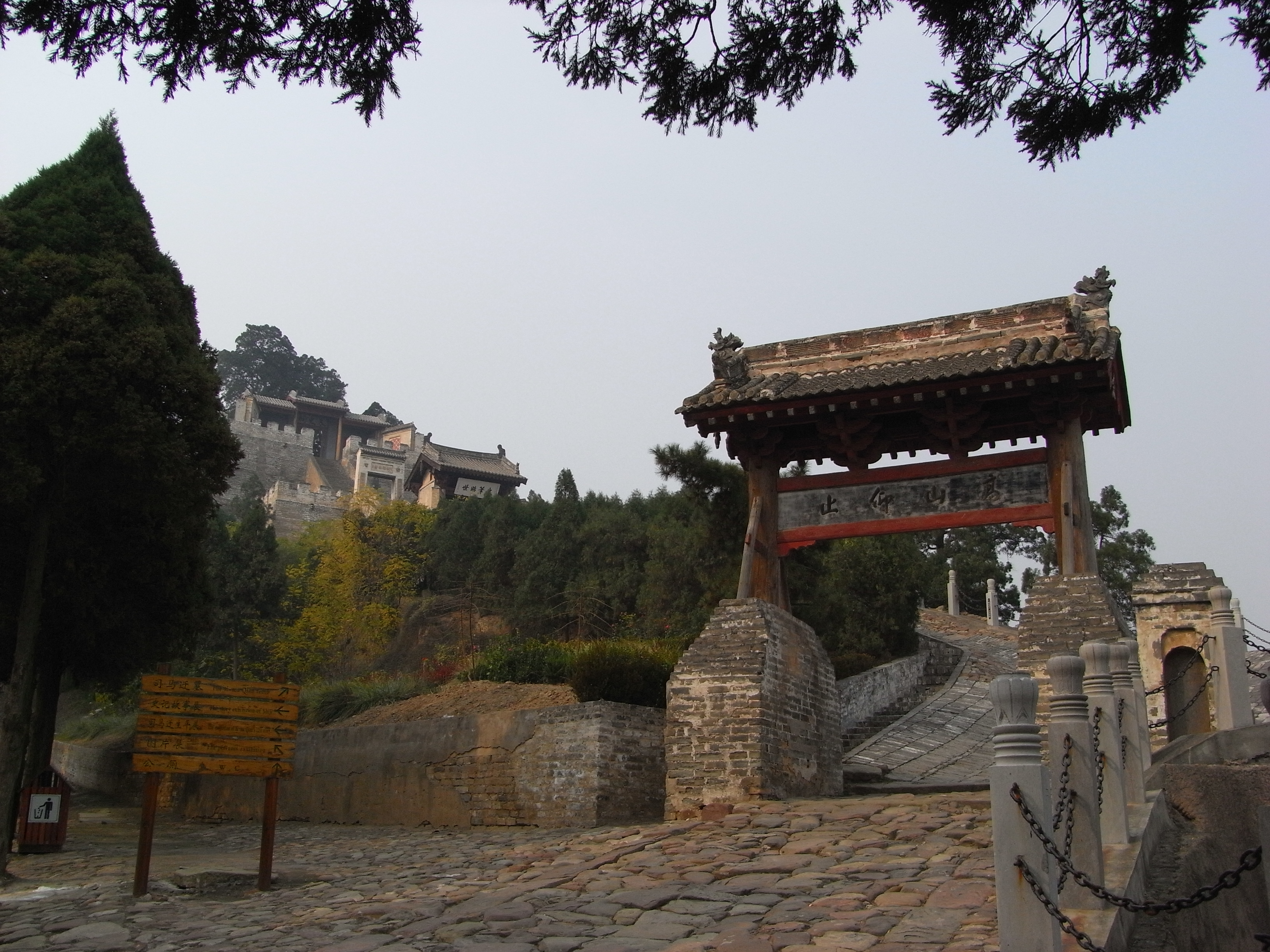
The tomb and ancestral temple of Sima Qian, located in Hancheng, Shaanxi.

Sima Qian was the son of court astrologer (太史令) Sima Tan, who was a descendant of Qin general Sima Cuo (司馬錯), the commander of Qin army in the state's conquest of Ba and Shu.

Before his castration, Sima Qian was recorded to have two sons and a daughter. While little is recorded of his sons, his daughter later married Yang Chang (楊敞) of the Yang clan of Hongnong, and had sons Yang Zhong (楊忠) and Yang Yun (楊惲; died c. February 55 BC) It was Yang Yun who hid his grandfather's great work, and decided to release it during the reign of Emperor Xuan.

=== Unsubstantiated descendants ===
According to local legend, Sima Qian had two sons, the older named Sima Lin (司馬臨) and younger named Sima Guan (司馬觀), who fled the capital to Xu Village (徐村) in what is now Shanxi province during the Li Ling affair, for fear of falling victim to familial extermination. They changed their surnames to Tong (同 = 丨+ 司) and Féng (馮 = 仌 + 馬), respectively, to hide their origins while continuing to secretly offer sacrifices to the Sima ancestors. To this day, people living in the village with surnames Feng and Tong are forbidden from intermarrying on the grounds that the relationship would be incestuous.

According to the Book of Han, Wang Mang sent an expedition to search for and ennoble a male-line descent of Sima Qian as 史通子 ("Viscount of Historical Mastery"), although it was not recorded who received this title of nobility. A Qing dynasty stele Records of the Renovation of the Temple of the Grand Historian (重修太史廟記) erected in the nearby county seat Han City (韓城) claims that the title was given to the grandson of Sima Lin.
