= Feng County =

Feng County may refer to two counties in China:

- Feng County, Shaanxi (凤县), under the administration of Baoji, Shaanxi
- Feng County, Jiangsu (丰县), under the administration of Xuzhou, Jiangsu
