= Rail transport in Jiangsu =

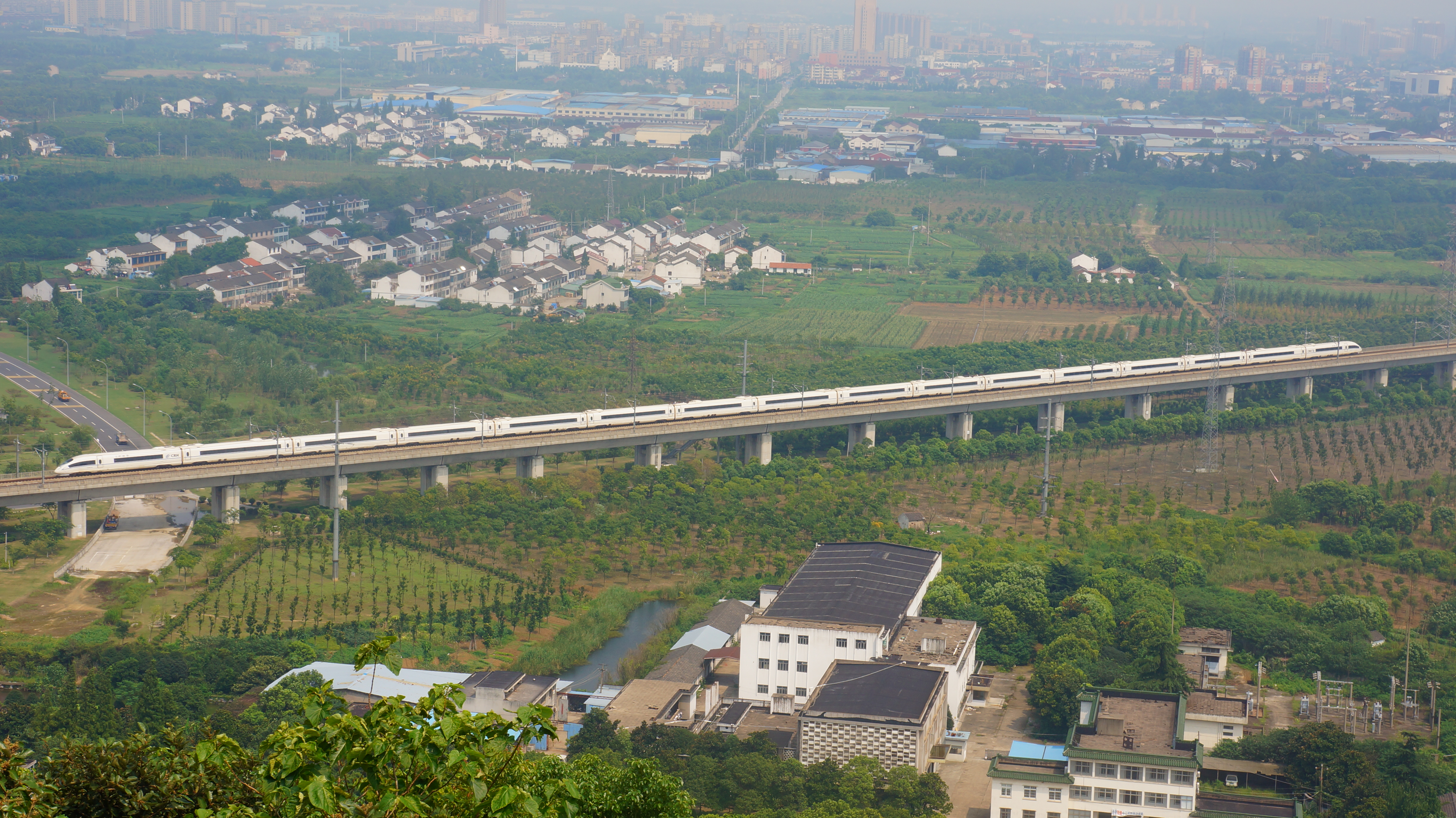
A high-speed train service on a viaduct near Houshan

Railways in Jiangsu, China have existed in the province since the early 20th century. More than 40 large and medium-sized cities in Jiangsu are connected by rail; Nanjing and Xuzhou are transportation centers. Two national rail lines—Longhai Railway (with service from Lianyungang to Ürümqi) and Jinghu Railway (with service from Beijing to Shanghai)—cross the province. A rail link among eight cities in the province (Nanjing, Zhenjiang, Changzhou, Wuxi, Suzhou, Yangzhou, Taizhou and Nantong) is planned. Train travel is popular in China; it is fast, more widely available than automobile travel and more economical than travel by air.

== History ==
The first railway in Jiangsu Province was the South Yangtze River section of the Jinghu Railway. A line from Shanghai to Xiaguan and Nanjing, known as the Huning Railway (and during the Republic of China era as the Kingwu Railway), was completed between April 1905 and July 1908 following an investment of British capital. In 1933, a train ferry service was opened on the Yangtze between Xiaguan and Pukou (both in Nanjing), and a direct express was initiated from Shanghai to Beiping.

Further track upgrades were completed over the following 50 years. On 18 April 2007 (after the sixth "speed-up movement" in China), part of Huning Railway was altered so it could support China Railway High-speed (CRH) trains travelling at speeds of 250 kilometres per hour (160 mph). An even faster CRH service, operating at up to 350 kilometres per hour (220 mph), commenced on 12 May 2010. By the end of 2008 eight railway lines (excluding the Corporation line) served the province, totalling 1,678 kilometres (1,043 mi) of track, with an additional two country lines of 37.5 kilometres (23.3 mi).

=== Operational lines ===
- Jinghu Railway (Jiangsu section)
- Longhai Railway (east section)
- Ningxi Railway
- Ningtong Railway
- Ningqi Railway
- Xinchang Railway
- Hening Railway
- Huning Intercity Railway
- Jinghu High Speed Railway (Jiangsu section)
- Ninghang Intercity Railway
- Ningan Intercity Railway

=== Under construction ===
- Shanghai–Nantong Railway
- Huaiyangzhen Railway
- Lianyan Railway

=== Planning ===
- Suhuai Railway (Suzhou to Huaian)
- Zhennan Railway
- Changsujia Intercity Railway
- Xuding Railway(Xuzhou to Dingtao)
- Haiyang Railway (Haian to Yangkou)
- Fengpei Railway (Feng to Pei)

== See also ==
- Rail transport in the People's Republic of China
- List of railways in China
