= Fengxian =

Fengxian may refer to:

- Fengxian District (奉贤区), Shanghai
- Feng County, Jiangsu (丰县), sometimes romanised as Fengxian
- Feng County, Shaanxi (凤县), sometimes romanised as Fengxian
- Lü Bu (? - 198 AD), courtesy name Fengxian, Chinese military general during the late Eastern Han dynasty
