= Cao Shen =

Chinese politician (died 190 BCE)

Cao Shen / Cao Can
- 曹參
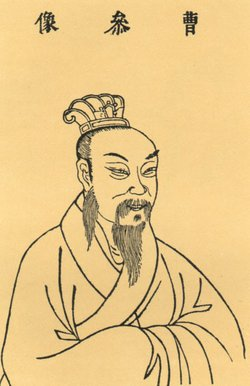
- An illustration of Cao Shen in the Sancai Tuhui

Chancellor of State (相國)
- In office 193–190 BC
- Monarch: Emperor Hui of Han
- Preceded by: Xiao He

Personal details
- Born: Unknown Pei County, Jiangsu
- Died: 190 BC
- Occupation: Official
- Courtesy name: Jingbo (敬伯)
- Peerage: Marquis of Pingyang (平陽侯)
- Religion: Legalised Chinese religion

Cao Shen or Cao Can (died 24 September 190 BCE), courtesy name Jingbo (Chinese: 敬伯), was a Chinese military general and politician. He served as a chancellor of the Western Han dynasty. He participated in the Chu–Han Contention on Liu Bang (Emperor Gaozu of Han)'s side and contributed greatly to the founding of the Han dynasty.

== Early life ==
Cao Shen was from Pei County in present-day Jiangsu and he served as a prison warden in his early days. He was a close friend of Liu Bang. Once, Liu Bang was tasked with escorting some convicts to Mount Li to become labourers, but some prisoners escaped and Liu was forced to become a fugitive. He sought refuge with his followers on Mount Mangdang (in present-day Yongcheng, Henan) and maintained secret contact with Cao Shen and Xiao He.

In 209 BC, after the Dazexiang Uprising broke out, the magistrate of Pei County considered rebelling against the Qin dynasty as well, so he heeded Cao Shen and Xiao He's advice to invite Liu Bang back to support him. However, the magistrate changed his mind later and denied Liu Bang entry into the city. He was worried that Xiao He and Cao Shen might open the city gates for Liu Bang, so he planned to have them killed, but Xiao and Cao managed to escape and join Liu. The townsfolk rebelled against the magistrate and killed him, allowing Liu Bang and his men to enter. Liu Bang built up his rebel army in Pei County and Cao Shen served as one of his advisors.

== Insurrection against the Qin dynasty ==
Cao Shen defeated the Qin armies led by Xue Guo, Hu Ling and Fang Yu, and was promoted to a high rank by Liu Bang for his contributions. Cao Shen defeated Zhang Han's army and drove Zhang towards Puyang. He returned to help Liu Bang, who was trapped at Yongqiu, and defeated Li You, the Qin general defending Sanchuan. By then, Cao Shen had conquered two fiefs and 122 counties in total. In the following battles against Qin, Cao Shen defeated the Qin generals Wang Li and Zhao Ben and captured the Wu and Yao passes leading to Xianyang (the Qin capital).

== Chu–Han Contention ==
After the fall of the Qin dynasty, Liu Bang received the title of "King of Han" from Xiang Yu, and was relocated to Hanzhong. Liu Bang granted Cao Shen the title of "Marquis of Jiancheng" (建成侯) and promoted him to a general rank. Cao Shen helped Liu Bang conquer the Three Qins. During the Chu–Han Contention, a power struggle between Liu Bang and Xiang Yu, Cao Shen joined Han Xin's army in the campaigns on the northern front. They scored victories against Wei Bao's forces, the Zhao army at the Battle of Jingxing, and the combined forces of Qi and Chu at the Battle of Wei River. During this time, Cao Shen was appointed as acting-Left Chancellor of Liu Bang's Han kingdom, and subsequently promoted to Right Chancellor. After the conquest of the Qi kingdom, Cao Shen left Han Xin and returned to Liu Bang's side to join him in resisting Xiang Yu. Liu Bang later sent Cao Shen to suppress the remnants of Qi.

In 202 BC, Liu Bang defeated Xiang Yu at the Battle of Gaixia and unified China under his rule. Liu Bang became the Emperor and his dynasty was named "Han". He was historically known as "Emperor Gao" (or Emperor Gaozu). When rewarding his subjects, Gaozu named Cao Shen as the person who made the most contributions in battle. However, Cao Shen resigned from his post as Right Chancellor. In 201 BC, Cao Shen was appointed as chancellor of Qi Kingdom, which was then ruled by Liu Fei (Gaozu's eldest son). He was also conferred the title of "Marquis of Pingyang" (平陽侯) and given 10,630 households in his marquisate.

== As chancellor ==
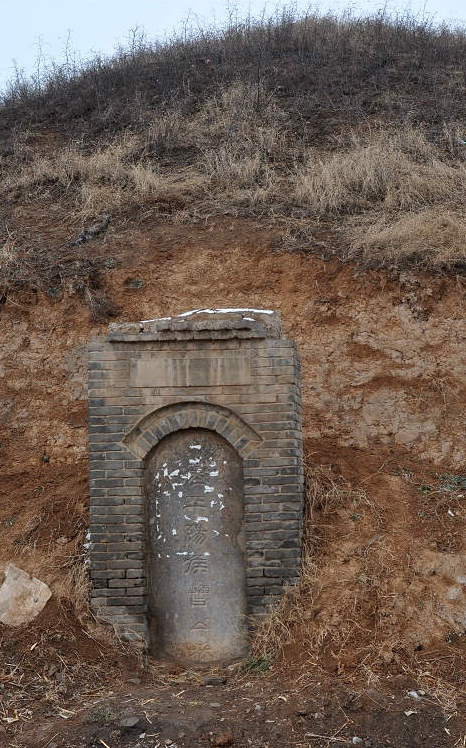
Cao Shen Tomb

While serving as chancellor, Cao Shen sought the help of Confucian scholars in governing Qi but was not impressed by their ideas. After discussing with a scholar called Gai Gong, Cao Shen was influenced by the Huang-Lao (黃老) school of thought, which used a mix of persuasion and coercion. Cao Shen followed Gai Gong's advice to implement policies to restore social stability and frequently consulted Gai Gong on how to govern Qi.

In 196 BC, he commanded the Qi forces that assisted the emperor in suppressing Chen Xi's rebellion in Dai (present-day northern Shanxi and northwestern Hebei).

In 193 BC, the chancellor Xiao He died and was succeeded by Cao Shen. Cao Shen spent his time drinking and feasting, and maintained well Xiao He's system of governance but did not implement any new changes. When Emperor Hui asked him why he did not change the system, Cao Shen replied that he was not as good as Xiao He and did not want to make changes for fear of negatively affecting the system left behind by Xiao. This became the origin of a Chinese idiom, Xiao Gui Cao Sui (萧规曹随; lit. "Cao following Xiao's rules"), which is used to describe the continuation of the work of one's predecessor.

== Appraisal ==
The historian Sima Qian commented in Records of the Grand Historian that he felt that among all of Liu Bang's subjects, Cao Shen's contributions in battle was second only to Han Xin. Commenting on Cao Shen's role as chancellor, Sima Qian mentioned that Cao had done well in preserving Xiao He's system of governance and achieved the peace and stability desired by the people.

== Family and descendants ==
Cao Shen's son, Cao Zhu (曹窋; died 161 BC), inherited his father's marquis title "Marquis of Pingyang". Cao Zhu was in turn succeeded by his son, Cao Qi (曹奇; died 153 BC), who helped Emperor Jing suppress the Rebellion of the Seven States. Cao Qi's son, Cao Shi (曹時; died 131 BC), married Princess Pingyang, one of Emperor Jing's daughters. Cao Shi's son, Cao Xiang (曹襄; died 115 BC), married Princess Wei (a daughter of Emperor Wu and Empress Wei Zifu) and served as a general in the Han campaigns against the Xiongnu. Cao Xiang's son, Cao Zong (曹宗; died 91 BC), was implicated in a plot to overthrow Emperor Wu in 91 BC and was stripped of the marquis title he inherited from his ancestor. He and his family also lost their inherited marquisate as a consequence.

Three Kingdoms warlord Cao Cao claimed to be a descendant of Cao Shen. However this has been refuted by genetic evidence.

Political offices
Preceded by Xiao He	Chancellor of China; 193–190 BC	Succeeded by Chen Ping
