= Pei Commandery =

Ancient Chinese political subdivision

Pei Commandery (Chinese: 沛郡) was a Chinese commandery from Han dynasty to Northern Qi dynasty. Its territory was located in present-day northern Anhui and northwestern Jiangsu, as well as part of Shandong and Henan.

Pei was established in early Western Han on an area formerly known as Sishui Commandery (泗水郡) during the Qin dynasty, and received its name from Pei County, Liu Bang's home county. The seat was at Xiang (相), in modern Huaibei, Anhui. The commandery was part of the vassal Kingdom of Chu during its early years. However, during Emperor Jing's reign, the imperial forces defeated Chu in the Rebellion of the Seven States and revoked the territory. In 117 BC, part of Pei was split off to form the new Linhuai Commandery. In 2 AD, the commandery consisted of 37 counties: Xiang (相), Longkang (龍亢), Zhu (竹), Guyang (穀陽), Xiao (蕭), Xiang (向), Zhi (銍), Guangqi (廣戚), Xiacai (下蔡), Feng (豐), Dan (鄲), Qiao (譙), Qi (蘄), Zhuan (颛), Zheyu (輒與), Shansang (山桑), Gongqiu (公丘), Fuli (符離), Jingqiu (敬丘), Xiaqiu (夏丘), Xiao (洨), Pei, Mang (芒), Jiancheng (建成), Chengfu (城父), Jianping (建平), Cuo (酇), Li (栗), Fuyang (扶陽), Gao (高), Gaochai (高柴), Piaoyang (漂陽), Ping'e (平阿), Dongxiang (東鄉), Lindu (臨都), Yicheng (義成) and Qixiang (祈鄉). The population was 2,030,480, or 409,079 households.

During Eastern Han, the commandery was converted to a principality nominally held by an imperial prince. A number of counties were merged in early Eastern Han, and in 140 AD, the principality administered 21 counties, including Xiang (相), Xiao, Pei, Feng, Guyang, Qiao, Xiao, Qi, Zhi, Dan, Jianping, Linsui (臨睢), Zhuyi (竹邑), Gongqiu, Longkang, Xiang (向), Fuli, Hong (虹), Taiqiu (太丘) and Zhuqiu (杼秋).

After Cao Wei dynasty was founded, Cao Pi followed Liu Bang's example and created a new commandery, Qiao Commandery, which was named after his father's home county. In 280 AD, Pei and Qiao had 9 and 7 counties respectively. The former had 5,096 households, while the latter had 1,000. Under the Northern dynasties, the commandery was further divided several times before being abolished in Northern Qi.
