= Zhonghang Yue =

Historical Figure

Zhonghang Yue (traditional Chinese: 中行說; simplified Chinese: 中行说; pinyin: Zhōngháng Yuè) was a eunuch from the Han dynasty who surrendered to Xiongnu (or Hun) nationality. He was selected as a retinue from Han to Hun and later served the Xiongnu emperor Laoshang Shanyu. Zhonghang Yue raised a series of theories for the international relations between Han and Xiongnu, which imposed great influence on the political practices of Xiongnu.

== Background ==
Zhonghang Yue lived during the Han dynasty, which had a complex relationship with its neighbor, Xiongnu, a tribal confederation inhabiting the eastern Eurasian Steppe. There were conflicts between the two regimes, as they confronted each other in several wars over resources and frontier issues. Policies maintained temporary peace. Heqin, a foreign policy of marriage alliance, was introduced by the Han following the defeat of their imperial army in 200 BC. The heqin policy created a marriage-based alliance by marrying Chinese princesses to Xiongnu rulers. Usually, intermarriages came with valuable presents, resources and other agreements (e.g.: opening of checkpoints), which were considered beneficial to Xiongnu. During the process of heqin, the Han would send a messenger to accomplish the mission of escorting the princess and delivering peaceful messages to Xiongnu.

== Collaboration ==
The Han history Records of the Grand Historian (Chinese: Shiji) provides evidence that Zhonghang Yue had made efforts to break the marriage-based peace between Han and Xiongnu.

Because the domestic political environment was unsteady in Han, Emperor Wen of Han thought that Han was not ready for another war against Xiongnu. Wen decided to use heqin marriage to appease Xiongnu and establish friendly relations. He selected Zhonghang Yue to act as the messenger to accompany the princess to Xiongnu. Zhonghang Yue was opposed to this, and stated, "If I had to go, I will be the future enemy of Han".

When Zhonghang Yue arrived among the Xiongnu, he immediately changed his allegiances. He suggested that the Shanyu (the Xiongnu ruler) demonstrate that Xiongnu was stronger than Han by looking down upon the Han gifts. For example, Xiongnu horse-riders could show that Han fabrics were inferior to Xiongnu fur, as the fabric becomes shredded when crossing forests. He suggested that Han food should be thrown away to show it is inferior to Xiongnu food.

Zhonghang Yue also showed his attitude through an argument with the Han ambassador. The Han ambassador once said that Xiongnu had the tradition of disregarding their elderly. Zhonghang Yue countered that the elderly from Han offered their food and clothes for the army, and that since the Xiongnu regime was based on military strength and the elderly were unable to fight, it was rational to give better resources to the strong youngsters to maximize benefits, so that both generations could survive.

Zhonghang Yue persuaded the Shanyu to invade. In 166 BC, Xiongnu invaded Han. Xiongnu soldiers captured thousands of peasants and livestock. The invasion began continuous war between Han and Xiongnu, which lasted until another heqin took place.

== Ideologies ==
Zhonghang Yue argued that, rather than being inferior to Han culture, Xiongnu culture and traditions were better. One of the most important ideologies of Zhonghang Yue was anti-Chinese localization.

The tradition of Xiongnu is eating meat from livestock, drinking their milk and wearing their fur. The livestock needs to move depending on the grass and water. Therefore, Xiongnu people practice using the bow and riding horses when there's an emergency and relax with little regulations on themselves when there is no emergency. Their bureaucratic system is so simple that domestic policy is like an individual. When a male dies, his wife will be remarried to his living brothers, father or sons to avoid the discontinuity of family. This is why Xiongnu rulers are always from the royal family, despite the complication of a family tree. Although China has regulations that forbid men from marrying the wives of their father or brothers, relationships between the family members are bad and they kill each other, which even results in changing family names. The rules of Han has resulted in resentment between emperor and ministers as well as the expenditure on the palace that exhaust people. Han people land and grow mulberry to provide themselves with food and cloth, they build walls for self-defense. Thus, Chinese people won't practice fighting during an emergency and end up working when there is no emergency. There is nothing superior about Han people living in good accommodation, wearing good clothes and chatting.

— Zhonghang Yue, as recorded in Records of the Grand Historian

Zhonghang Yue asked the Shanyu to use a bigger board, stamp and sealing mud that the Han emperor to write his reply. He also used an arrogant tone in the greeting of the reply to show the power of Xiongnu.

Zhonghang Yue once said: "the total population of Xiongnu is less than a province in Han. However, the differences between Han and Xiongnu are the reason that Xiongnu is powerful. Thus, there is no need for Xiongnu and its people to be dependent on Han." Zhonghang Yue showed his attitude of encouraging ethnic independence of Xiongnu and separation from Han in this dialogue.

When the Han dynasty sent messengers to debate with Zhonghang Yue, he said: "There is no need for you to say anything. Just know that the quantity and quality of food and cloth that Han offered to Xiongnu must be satisfying. Otherwise, Xiongnu riders will destroy your crops when autumn comes.

== Legacy ==
=== Criticism ===
Zhonghang Yue is frequently viewed as a hanjian (a Han race traitor) who betrayed his country and helped its enemy. The Records of the Grand Historian indicate that his practices harmed the interest of the Han dynasty. He calculated the population of Xiongnu and estimated its power. In addition, the arrogance that Zhonghang Yue showed in diplomatic affairs was considered an insult against the Han. His suggestions to the Shanyu led to several wars towards Han. Jia Yi, a Chinese poet and politician in the Western Han dynasty, criticized Zhonghang Yue. Jia Yi supported the establishment of a strong and united China through eliminating the Xiongnu regime and Chinese localization. There is also criticism on his shallow argument that war was the only reason for the cultural differences between Han and Xiongnu, ignoring the influence of geographical location and climate.

=== In popular culture ===
Zhonghang Yue was played by Chen Changhai in the 2005 television series The Emperor in Han Dynasty. The character was described as a "think tank of the Xiongnu people and the very first Hanjian in China." This character is written based on the true history despite minor changes for the performance.
