= Prince of Qin (video game) =

2002 video game

- Developer: Object Software
- Publishers: NA: Strategy First; EU: GMX Media
- Director: Gang Liu
- Designer: Yubin Liu
- Programmers: Zhipeng Zhang; Yan Liu
- Artists: Yong Wan; Zhenzhou Xu; Kun Liu
- Composer: Brahma Studio
- Platform: Microsoft Windows
- Release: NA: August 20, 2002; EU: January 30, 2004
- Genre: Action role-playing
- Modes: Single-player, multiplayer

Prince of Qin (Chinese: 秦殇; pinyin: Qín Shāng) is a 2002 action role-playing game developed by Object Software and published by Strategy First. The story is set in China in the final years of the Qin dynasty (221–206 BC), with Fusu – the heir apparent to the first Qin emperor, Qin Shi Huang – as the protagonist. Although the game has a historical basis, its setting is purely fictitious because the historical Fusu died in 210 BC.

== Gameplay ==
The game balances team-fighting, with up to five heroes per team, and the use of various skills and abilities. There are 5 classes: Paladin, Muscleman, Assassin, Wizard, and Witch, with a total of 16 available characters. The player is challenged by many enemies in more than 100 unique scenes accurately depicting the society and architecture of the Qin dynasty. The game's novel features include multi-scenario and multi-ending systems, randomly generated weapons, items and enemies, an equipment-creating system and a sophisticated fighting system rooted in the ancient Chinese philosophy of the Five Elements.

== Plot ==
There are 11 chapters in the game, each requiring the player to complete a main quest to proceed to the next. The player may concurrently accept side quests and complete them in any chapter before the finale.

Fusu, the Crown Prince of the Qin Empire, has been sent to defend the northern border along with Meng Tian. He suddenly receives an imperial decree from his father, the First Emperor, ordering him to commit suicide. Meng Tian suspects something amiss about the order so he stops Fusu and helps him escape. After making his way back to the capital Xianyang, Fusu hears that his father is dead and that his youngest brother, Huhai, has been enthroned as the Second Emperor. He meets his friend, Huan Feng, who tells him that the First Emperor had died under suspicious circumstances.

Fusu decides to enter his father's tomb to investigate and seeks help from Xiao Qi, a traps specialist. Xiao Qi sends his apprentice, Jing Wuji, to accompany Fusu on his quest. While travelling around the empire, Fusu obtains special items he needs for the quest and navigates his way through the labyrinthine tomb, fights some terracotta soldiers, and finally enters the inner chamber where the First Emperor is buried. He examines his father's body and discovers that his father was strangled to death and had been poisoned over a long period of time.

After leaving the tomb, Fusu meets Fang Zhong, a Mohist who tells him that rebellions have broken out due to the Qin Empire's tyrannical rule. He decides to help the rebels, but feels disheartened after witnessing how the infighting among some rebel leaders led to their downfalls. Upon hearing that Liu Bang, whom he met earlier, had also started a rebellion, he joins Liu Bang and helps him recapture Feng County from a defector. Later, he also persuades his friend Li You, the Qin general defending Sanchuan Prefecture, to surrender to Liu Bang. In the meantime, Li You's father, the Prime Minister Li Si, has been framed for treason and imprisoned by Zhao Gao, a treacherous eunuch who has been manipulating the Second Emperor. With Huan Feng's help, Fusu and Li You break into the prison to save Li Si, but they fail when Huan Feng, who is under Zhao Gao's control, betrays them. They escape from the prison after Fusu defeats and reluctantly kills Huan Feng.

Fusu travels to Julu to meet Xiang Yu and update himself on the rebels' progress. Xiang Yu has just won a battle against Qin forces and ordered 200,000 prisoners-of-war to be buried alive. Disappointed by Xiang Yu's cruelty and ill-disciplined army, Fusu leaves Julu and joins Liu Bang, whom he feels is a better leader compared to Xiang Yu. He then infiltrates Wancheng and convinces the Qin governor to surrender to Liu Bang.

Having helped to pave the rebels' way to victory, Fusu goes to the Epang Palace to confront Huhai, but arrives too late as Zhao Gao had sent assassins to kill Huhai. Before dying, Huhai confesses to Fusu that he abetted Zhao Gao in murdering their father and blames Zhao Gao for the Qin Empire's downfall. In the final chapter, Fusu breaks into Zhao Gao's underground palace and kills him in revenge.

There are many endings to the game, depending on the quests completed and the characters in Fusu's party at the end. If two or more conditions are fulfilled, the game will choose a random ending among those available.

== Reception ==
Reception

Aggregate scores
| Aggregator | Score |
|---|---|
| GameRankings | 65% |
| Metacritic | 61/100 |

Review scores
| Publication | Score |
|---|---|
| Computer Gaming World | 1.5/5 |
| GameSpot | 6.7/10 |
| GameSpy | 3/5 |
| GameZone | 7/10 |
| IGN | 6.8/10 |
| PC Gamer (US) | 54% |

The game received "mixed" reviews, according to video game review aggregators GameRankings and Metacritic.
