= Feng County, Shaanxi =

Coordinates: 34°00′53″N 106°46′12″E

Feng County 凤县
- County
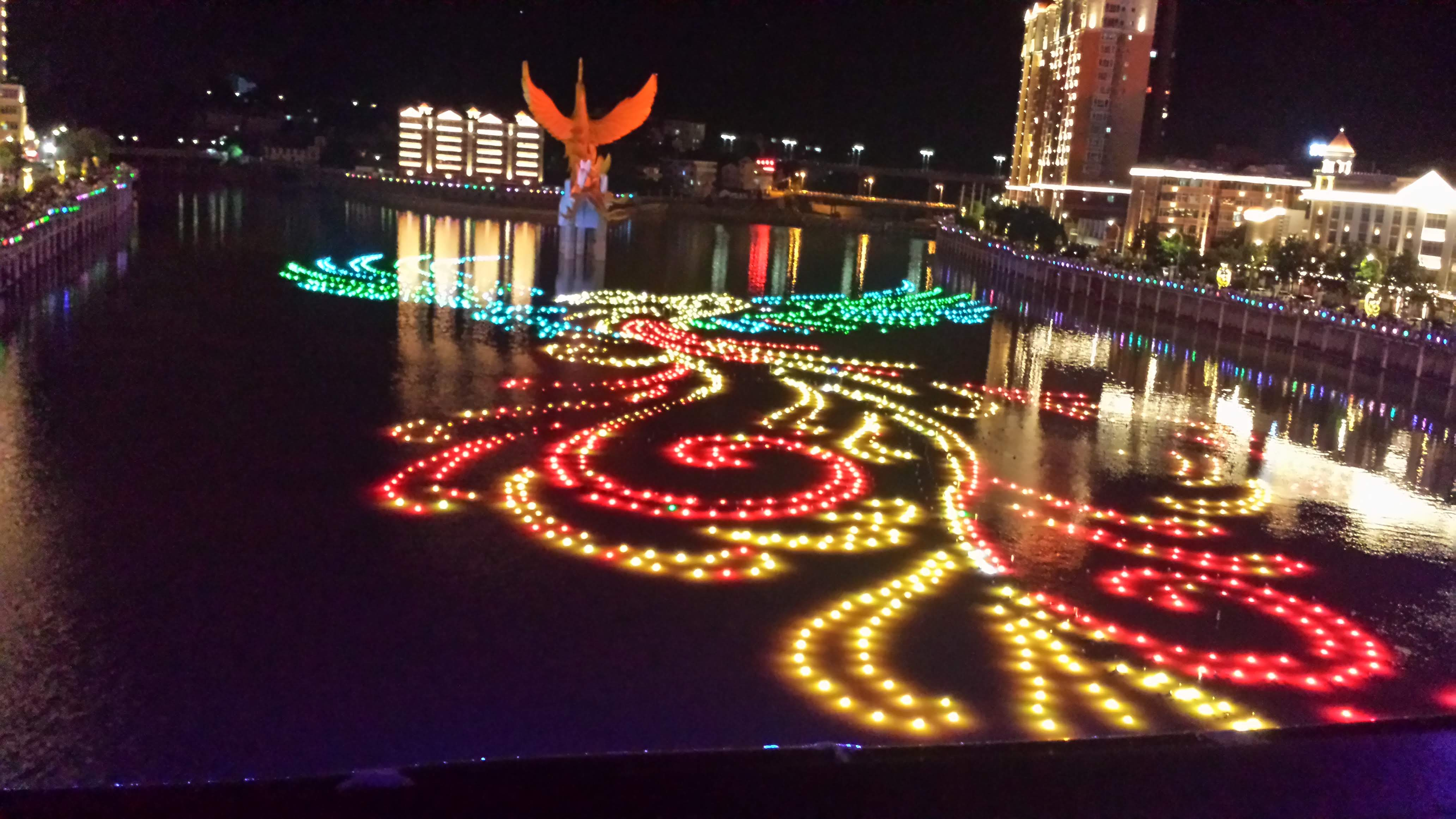
- Phoenix Fountain and Sculpture with lights - 2018

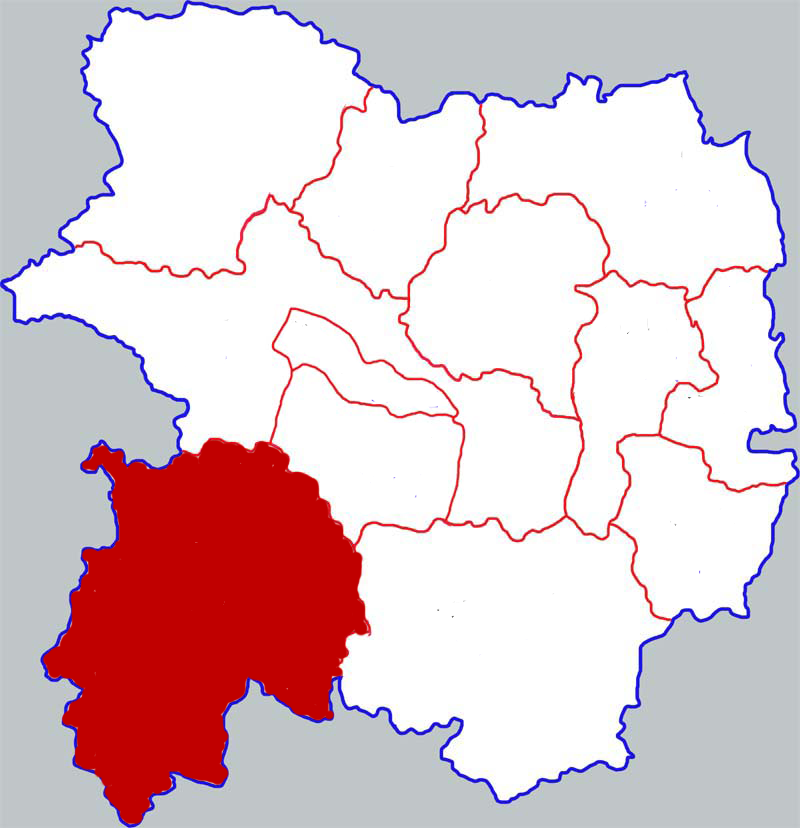
- Feng County in Baoji

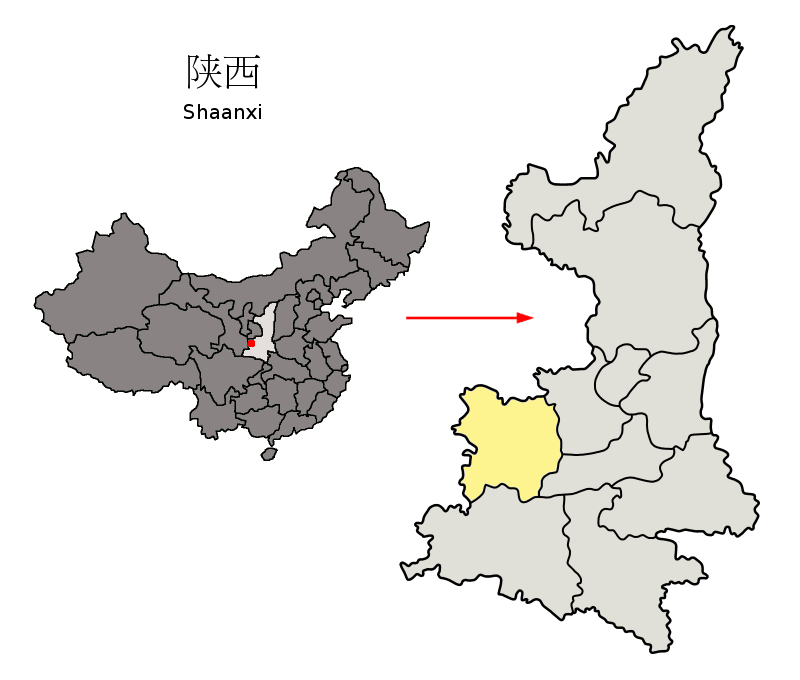
- Baoji in Shaanxi
- Country: People's Republic of China
- Province: Shaanxi
- Prefecture-level city: Baoji

Area
  - Total: 3,187 km^{2} (1,231 sq mi)

Population (2019)
  - Total: 107,051
  - Density: 33.59/km^{2} (87.00/sq mi)
- Time zone: UTC+8 (China standard time)
- Postal code: 721700
- Licence plates: 陕C
- Website: www.sxfx.gov.cn

Feng County or Fengxian (simplified Chinese: 凤县; traditional Chinese: 鳳縣; pinyin: Fèng Xiàn) is a county under the administration of Baoji City, in the west of Shaanxi province, China, bordering Gansu province to the west. There are museums, including a new one about Gung Ho.

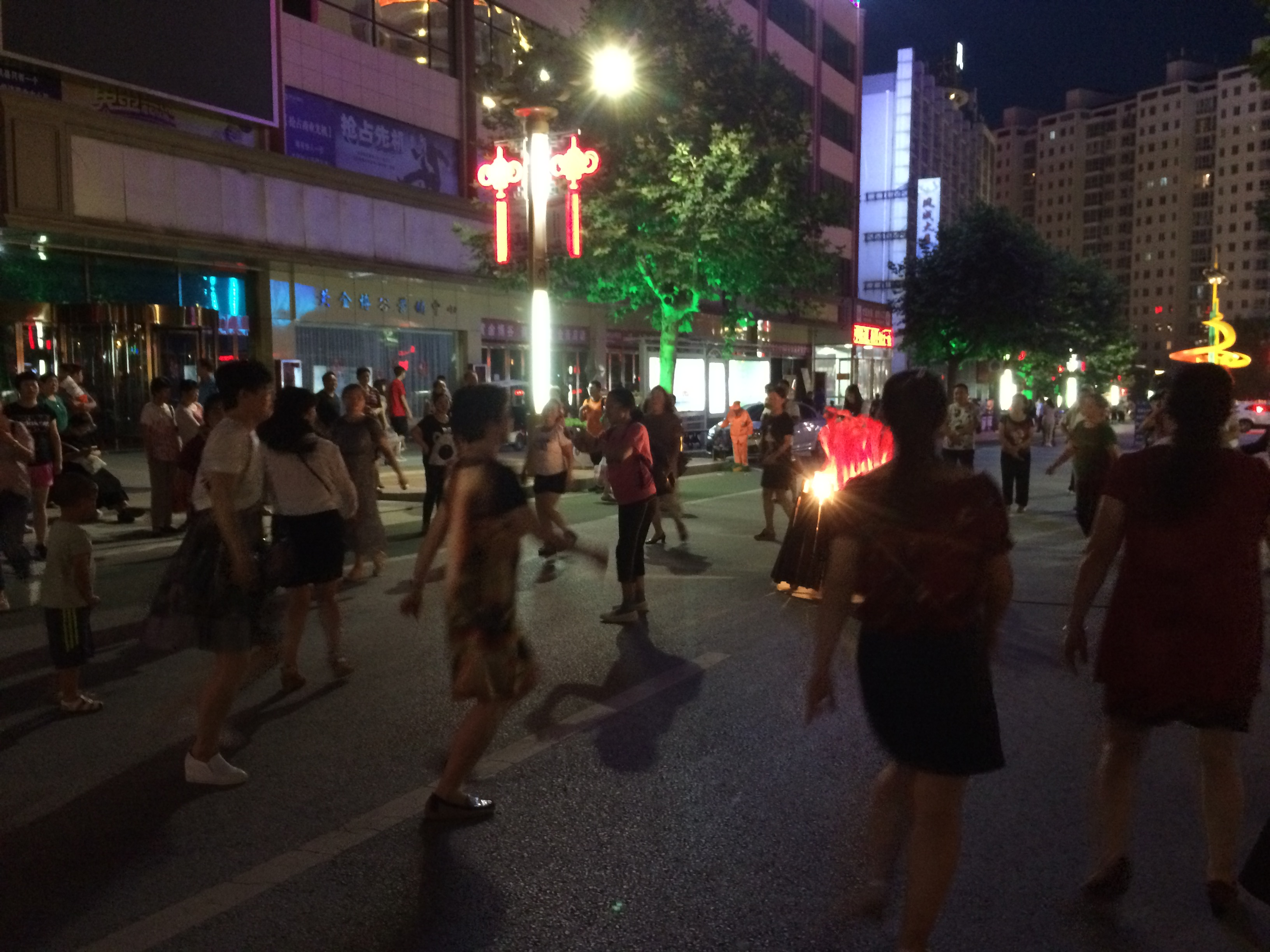
Evening Street Dancing in Shuangshipu

== Administrative divisions ==
As of 2020, this County is divided to 9 towns.

Towns

- Shuangshipu (双石铺镇)
- Fengzhou (凤州镇)
- Huangniupu (黄牛铺镇)
- Honghuapu (红花铺镇)
- Hekou (河口镇)
- Tangzang (唐藏镇)
- Pingmu (平木镇)
- Pingkan (坪坎镇)
- Liufengguan (留凤关镇)

== Climate ==
Climate data for Fengxian, elevation 984 m (3,228 ft), (1991–2020 normals, extremes 1981–present)
Month	Jan	Feb	Mar	Apr	May	Jun	Jul	Aug	Sep	Oct	Nov	Dec	Year
Record high °C (°F)	17.0 (62.6)	22.3 (72.1)	31.7 (89.1)	34.1 (93.4)	36.2 (97.2)	37.6 (99.7)	37.7 (99.9)	36.1 (97.0)	36.3 (97.3)	28.9 (84.0)	24.1 (75.4)	15.9 (60.6)	37.7 (99.9)
Mean daily maximum °C (°F)	7.1 (44.8)	10.2 (50.4)	15.6 (60.1)	21.8 (71.2)	25.4 (77.7)	29.1 (84.4)	30.0 (86.0)	29.1 (84.4)	23.5 (74.3)	18.3 (64.9)	13.3 (55.9)	8.2 (46.8)	19.3 (66.7)
Daily mean °C (°F)	0.0 (32.0)	3.3 (37.9)	8.1 (46.6)	13.5 (56.3)	16.6 (61.9)	20.7 (69.3)	22.8 (73.0)	22.1 (71.8)	17.4 (63.3)	11.9 (53.4)	6.2 (43.2)	1.1 (34.0)	12.0 (53.6)
Mean daily minimum °C (°F)	−4.7 (23.5)	−1.5 (29.3)	2.6 (36.7)	7.3 (45.1)	8.6 (47.5)	13.4 (56.1)	17.2 (63.0)	17.5 (63.5)	13.6 (56.5)	8.1 (46.6)	1.7 (35.1)	−3.6 (25.5)	6.7 (44.0)
Record low °C (°F)	−15.5 (4.1)	−12.4 (9.7)	−7.7 (18.1)	−3.1 (26.4)	1.5 (34.7)	6.3 (43.3)	10.4 (50.7)	10.3 (50.5)	3.4 (38.1)	−3.7 (25.3)	−10.1 (13.8)	−14.9 (5.2)	−15.5 (4.1)
Average precipitation mm (inches)	2.4 (0.09)	5.7 (0.22)	16.9 (0.67)	39.3 (1.55)	50.4 (1.98)	72.0 (2.83)	127.6 (5.02)	117.7 (4.63)	103.6 (4.08)	52.3 (2.06)	13.3 (0.52)	2.3 (0.09)	603.5 (23.74)
Average precipitation days (≥ 0.1 mm)	3.6	4.2	7.4	9.0	11.6	12.1	13.3	12.7	13.2	11.9	6.4	3.3	108.7
Average snowy days	5.1	3.9	1.7	0.2	0	0	0	0	0	0.1	1.5	3.8	16.3
Average relative humidity (%)	58	58	58	61	59	65	75	78	81	80	72	63	67
Mean monthly sunshine hours	117.7	104.9	133.4	165.1	174.3	168.5	172.7	163.8	102.3	102.3	106.3	117.2	1,628.5
Percentage possible sunshine	37	33	36	42	40	39	40	40	28	30	34	38	36
Source: China Meteorological Administrationall-time extreme temperature
