= Mount Mangdang =

Hill in Yongcheng, China

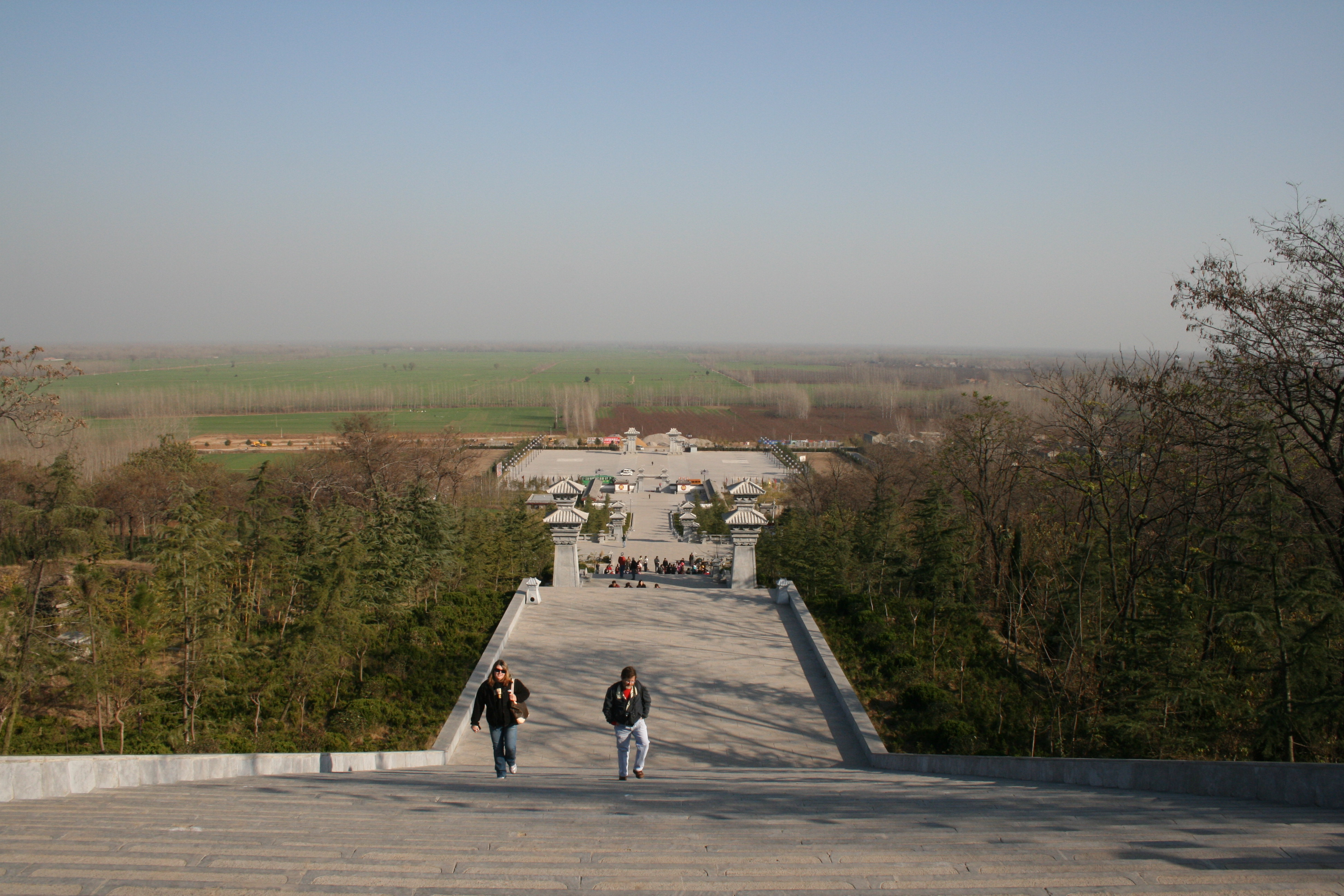
- Liang Tombs at Mount Mangdang

Highest point
- Elevation: 156.8 m (514 ft)
- Coordinates: 34°10′14″N 116°30′08″E

Geography
- Location: Yongcheng, Henan, China

Mount Mangdang (simplified Chinese: 芒砀山; traditional Chinese: 芒碭山) is a hill in Yongcheng, Henan, China, best known for being the spot where the Emperor Gaozu of Han started his rebellion against the Qin dynasty.

== History ==
The region near Mount Mangdang played an important role during the late Qin uprisings. Chen Sheng, leader of the first rebellion against the Qin, was buried under the hill. In 210 BC, the future Emperor Gaozu of Han declared his rebellion at Mount Mangdang, in a famous event known as the "Slaying of the White Serpent". A shrine for Emperor Gaozu was constructed at the site during Emperor Wen of Han's reign. The structure was subsequently destroyed and reconstructed for several times; the current buildings date to the Qing dynasty.

In later times, Mount Mangdang saw several battles in various peasant rebellions, including Li Zicheng's revolt and the Taiping Heavenly Kingdom movement. In the Sino-Japanese War, Lu Yuting (魯雨亭), a Kuomintang general, was killed in combat in this area.

== Archaeology ==
Mount Mangdang hosts mausoleums of the Han dynasty Kings of Liang. During the Three Kingdoms era, Cao Cao led his army to loot the tombs, greatly enriching himself and his soldiers.

Currently, several tombs belonging to Liang kings and their families have been discovered, most notably that of the King Xiao of Liang. A mural named Sishen Yunqi Tu (四神云气图), discovered in the mausoleum of King Gong of Liang, is considered a national treasure.
