= Pei County =

Peixian 沛县
- County
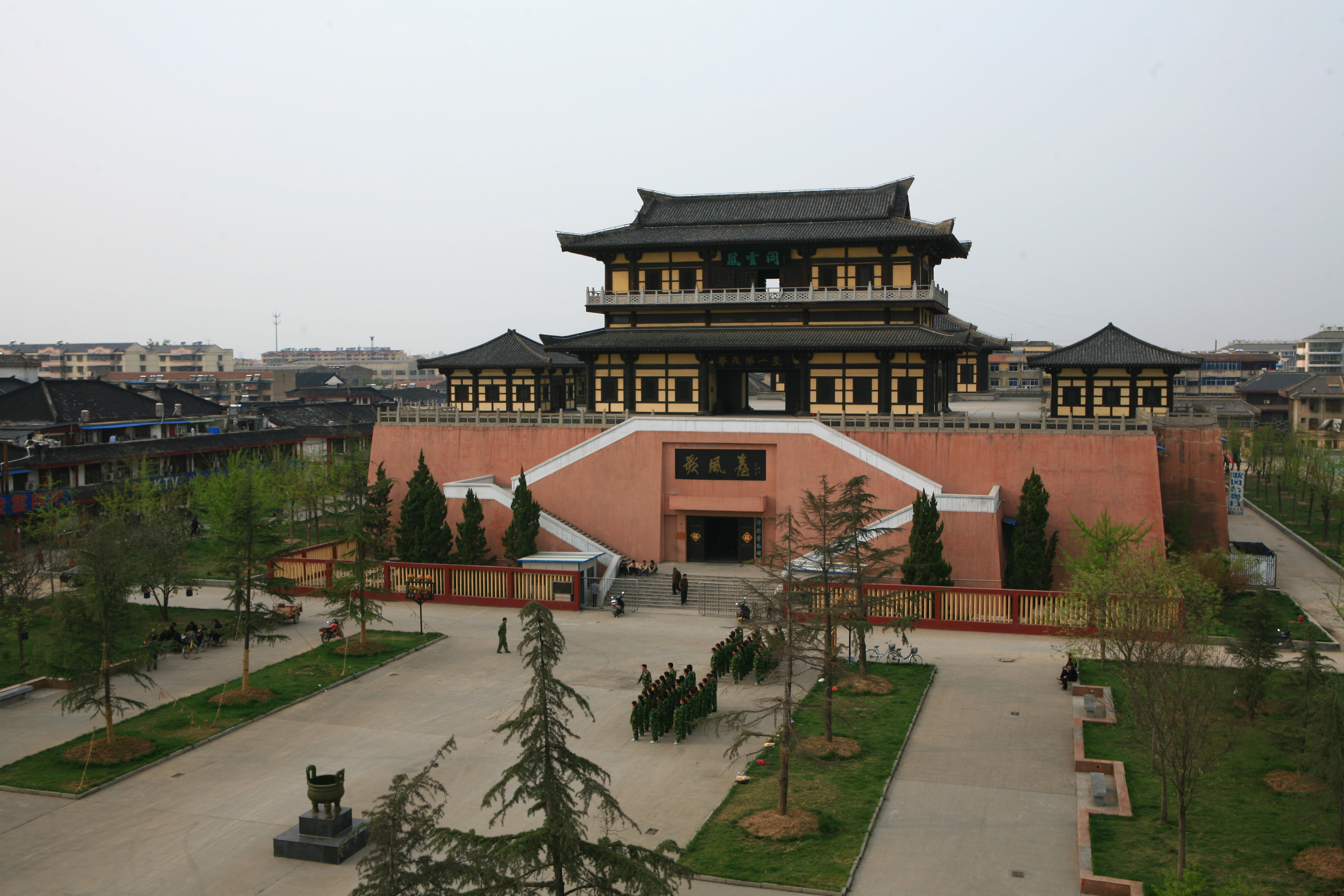
- Gefeng Tai (歌风台)

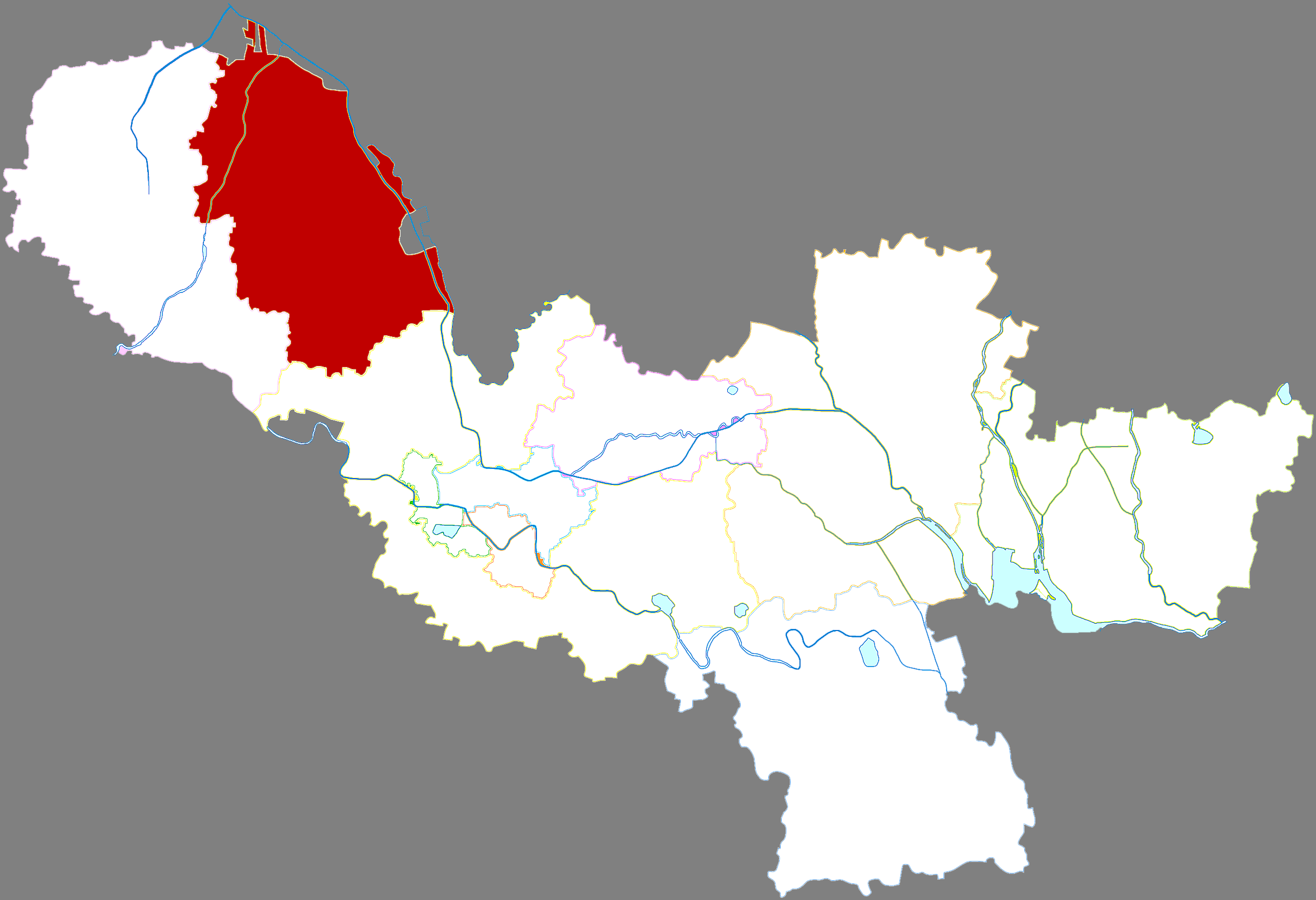
- Location in Xuzhou

- Location in Jiangsu
- Coordinates: 34°42′58″N 116°55′08″E
- Country: People's Republic of China
- Province: Jiangsu
- Prefecture-level city: Xuzhou

Area
  - County: 1,806 km^{2} (697 sq mi)

Population (2020 census)
  - County: 1,038,337
  - Density: 574.9/km^{2} (1,489/sq mi)
  - Urban: 596,272 (57%)
  - Rural: 442,065 (43%)
- Time zone: UTC+8 (China Standard)
- Postal code: 221600
- Area code: 0516
- Website: www.px.gov.cn

Pei County, or Peixian (simplified Chinese: 沛县; traditional Chinese: 沛縣; pinyin: Pèi Xiàn), is under the administration of Xuzhou, Jiangsu province, China, bordering the Shandong prefecture-level cities of Jining to the northwest and Zaozhuang to the northeast and sitting on the western shore of Nansi Lake. It has an area of 1,576 square kilometres (608 sq mi) and a population of 1,141,935 in 2010.

== History ==
Pei County was the hometown of Liu Bang, the founding emperor of the Han dynasty, and of his oath brother Fan Kuai, one of the most well-known lords who helped Liu Bang to overthrow the Qin dynasty and establish the Han dynasty. Fan Kuai's descendants are still living in Pei County now.

Xiaopei (小沛) is an ancient Chinese town located in present-day Pei County. In the late Eastern Han dynasty, it was under the jurisdiction of the Xu Province, which was governed by Tao Qian. Before Tao Qian died, he handed his governorship over to Liu Bei. Liu Bei took refuge in Xiaopei when Lü Bu seized the Xu Province from him through deceit.

== Administrative divisions ==
In the present, Pei County has 15 towns.

15 towns

- Longgu (龙固镇)
- Yangtun (杨屯镇)
- Datun (大屯镇)
- Peicheng (沛城镇)
- Huzhai (胡寨镇)
- Weimiao (魏庙镇)
- Wuduan (五段镇)
- Zhangzhuang (张庄镇)
- Zhangzhai (张寨镇)
- Jing'an (敬安镇)
- Hekou (河口镇)
- Qishan (栖山镇)
- Lulou (鹿楼镇)
- Zhuzhai (朱寨镇)
- Anguo (安国镇)

== Climate ==
Climate data for Peixian, elevation 37 m (121 ft), (1991–2020 normals, extremes 1951–present)
Month	Jan	Feb	Mar	Apr	May	Jun	Jul	Aug	Sep	Oct	Nov	Dec	Year
Record high °C (°F)	19.0 (66.2)	26.0 (78.8)	33.0 (91.4)	33.7 (92.7)	38.6 (101.5)	40.4 (104.7)	40.7 (105.3)	38.5 (101.3)	36.5 (97.7)	35.7 (96.3)	30.0 (86.0)	21.7 (71.1)	40.7 (105.3)
Mean daily maximum °C (°F)	5.6 (42.1)	8.8 (47.8)	15.5 (59.9)	21.5 (70.7)	26.9 (80.4)	31.2 (88.2)	32.1 (89.8)	31.2 (88.2)	27.1 (80.8)	21.9 (71.4)	13.9 (57.0)	7.4 (45.3)	20.3 (68.5)
Daily mean °C (°F)	0.6 (33.1)	3.7 (38.7)	9.8 (49.6)	15.6 (60.1)	21.5 (70.7)	25.9 (78.6)	27.8 (82.0)	26.8 (80.2)	22.2 (72.0)	16.3 (61.3)	9.0 (48.2)	2.3 (36.1)	15.1 (59.2)
Mean daily minimum °C (°F)	−3.2 (26.2)	−0.2 (31.6)	5.0 (41.0)	10.4 (50.7)	16.5 (61.7)	21.3 (70.3)	24.3 (75.7)	23.6 (74.5)	18.5 (65.3)	11.9 (53.4)	5.0 (41.0)	−1.5 (29.3)	11.0 (51.7)
Record low °C (°F)	−21.3 (−6.3)	−20.7 (−5.3)	−9.3 (15.3)	−3.9 (25.0)	1.4 (34.5)	9.7 (49.5)	16.1 (61.0)	13.1 (55.6)	4.0 (39.2)	−2.0 (28.4)	−10.4 (13.3)	−15.5 (4.1)	−21.3 (−6.3)
Average precipitation mm (inches)	14.2 (0.56)	19.8 (0.78)	25.8 (1.02)	39.0 (1.54)	63.6 (2.50)	89.0 (3.50)	199.1 (7.84)	181.0 (7.13)	70.2 (2.76)	32.0 (1.26)	34.0 (1.34)	15.4 (0.61)	783.1 (30.84)
Average precipitation days (≥ 0.1 mm)	4.1	4.6	5.1	6.1	7.1	7.3	11.8	11.1	7.2	5.7	5.5	4.1	79.7
Average snowy days	3.2	2.6	0.7	0	0	0	0	0	0	0	0.8	1.4	8.7
Average relative humidity (%)	67	64	60	62	65	66	78	80	75	69	70	68	69
Mean monthly sunshine hours	124.5	131.8	179.2	202.1	215.5	186.0	168.3	171.9	167.5	161.7	136.5	127.5	1,972.5
Percentage possible sunshine	40	42	48	51	50	43	38	42	45	47	45	42	44
Source: China Meteorological Administration
