= Feng County, Jiangsu =

Fengxian 丰县
- County
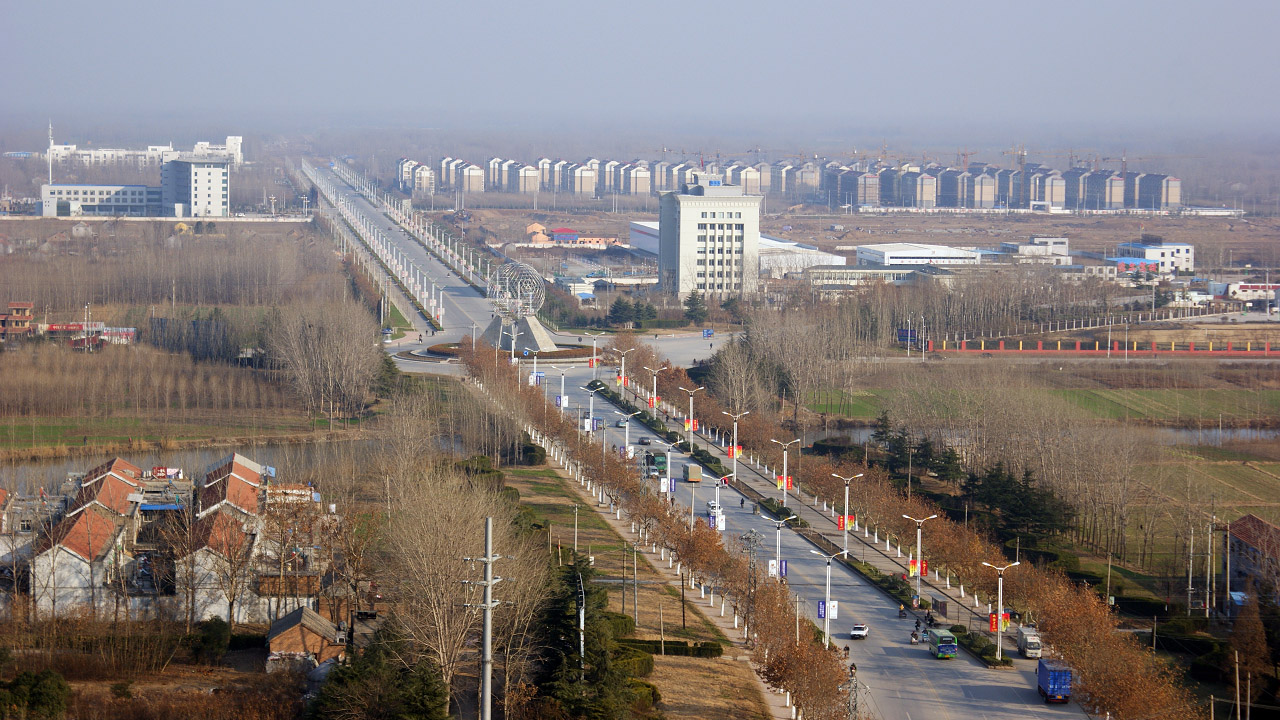

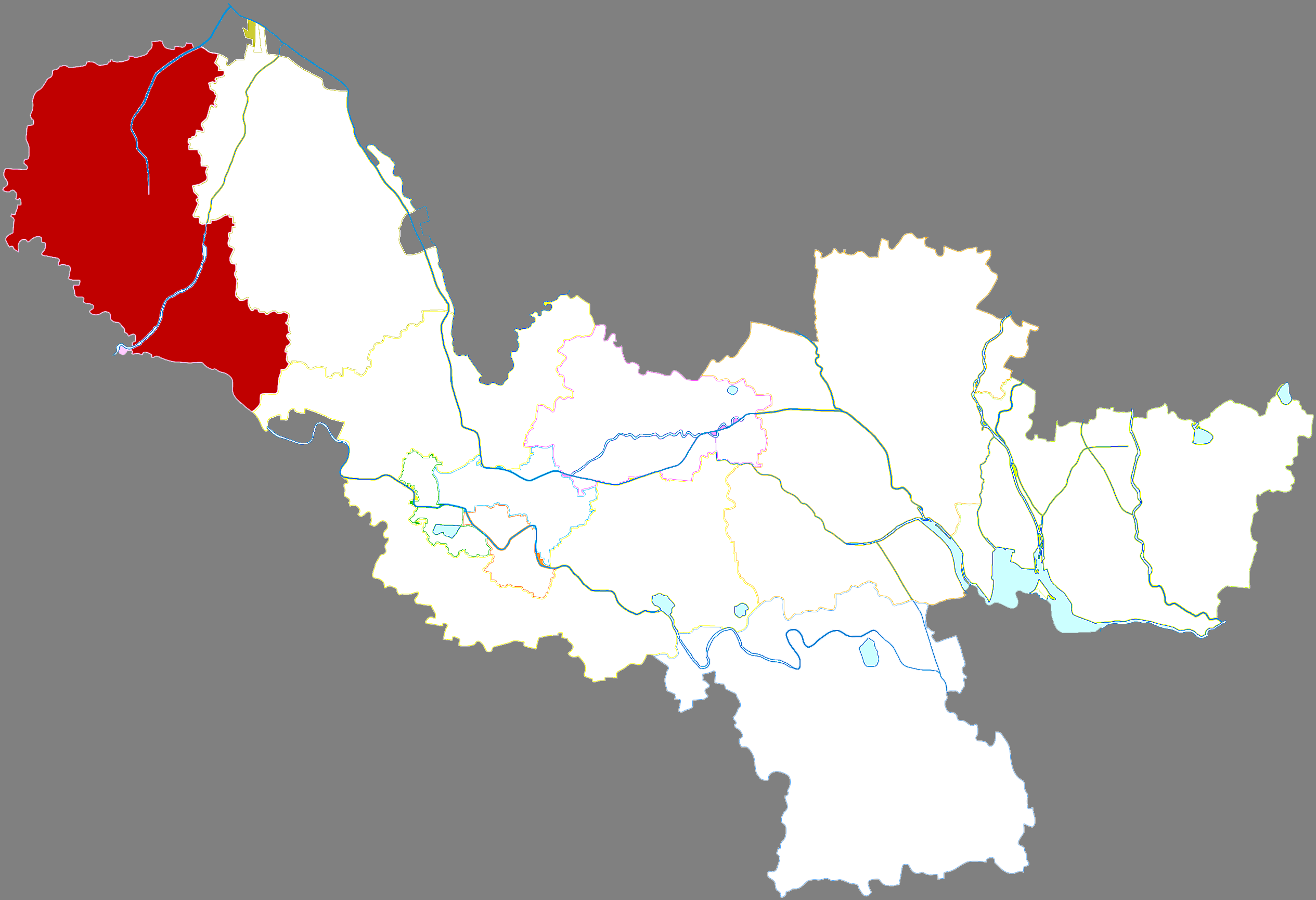
- Location in Xuzhou

- Location in Jiangsu
- Coordinates: 34°40′26″N 116°37′05″E
- Country: People's Republic of China
- Province: Jiangsu
- Prefecture-level city: Xuzhou

Area
  - County: 1,450.2 km^{2} (559.9 sq mi)

Population (2020 census)
  - County: 935,200
  - Density: 644.9/km^{2} (1,670/sq mi)
  - Urban: 504,761 (54%)
  - Rural: 430,439 (46%)
- Time zone: UTC+8 (China Standard)
- Postal code: 221700
- Website: www.chinafx.gov.cn

Feng County, or Fengxian (simplified Chinese: 丰县; traditional Chinese: 豐縣; pinyin: Fēng Xiàn), is under the administration of Xuzhou, Jiangsu province, China. Being the northwesternmost and westernmost county-level division in both Xuzhou and the province, it borders the provinces of Shandong to the north and west, and Anhui to the south. It is well known for its approximately 11,120 acres (or 450,000 ares) of Fuji apple trees.

== History ==
=== Early history ===
Ming-dynasty Xu Prefectural Gazetteer (徐州府志) and Qing-dynasty General History of Xu Prefecture (徐州通志) all recorded that "there was Xuzhou before Xuanyuan, but only Feng County has no recorded year." This means that Xuzhou already existed before the time of Xuanyuan (the Yellow Emperor), and that Feng County existed even before the keeping of chronological records. In other words, Feng is regarded as among the earliest human settlements on the Huang–Huai Plain.

The word "Feng" (豐, literally "bountiful harvest") has dual meanings: firstly, it was the name of an ancient tributary of the Si River which flowed through the area; and secondly, the area was deemed to be bountiful, while "feng" is also an adjective to describe such a condition in Chinese.

Feng County belonged to State of Song until it was annexed by State of Qi in 286 BC, and was taken by Chu in 284 BC in a collective war against Qi led by Yue Yi. After Qin Shi Huang unified China, Feng was put under the administration under Sishui Commandery. During the uprising in late Qin dynasty, Liu Bang and his political faction rose to prominence here.

=== Imperial era ===
Feng County was administered as a town under Pei county called Feng Estate (豐邑) by the early Han dynasty, before its establishment. Then it was assigned to then Pei Commandery, Yu province until 583, being a part of Pengcheng Commandery (later Xuzhou). It was once disestablished, but was restored in 457. The county was temporarily under the jurisdiction of Shandong province during 1949–53.

=== Chained woman incident ===
In January 2022, a Chinese blogger published video footage of a mother-of-eight, chained by the neck in a freezing shed in Feng County. According to a government statement released on 23 February, she originated from Yunnan, had been brought by a trafficker to Jiangsu in 1998, where she was sold twice as a bride, and had given birth to eight children between 1999 and 2020. The statement also said that her real name was Xiaohuamei. Her name had previously been reported as Yang Qingxia. The footage sparked outrage on the Chinese Internet and also garnered international attention. Initial attempts by local Xuzhou and Feng County authorities to quell the anger through statements proved to backfire for their clumsiness, for being contradictory, and for not addressing a number of questions arising from the footage. Some observers believed that the wider problem of trafficking women in this area had been enabled by the connivance of local officials. County-level militia was deployed to seal off the home village of Xiaohuamei, and more than 100 people were questioned by police over the public leaking of information related to her case. Xiaohuamei's husband, surnamed Dong, was officially arrested on 22 February, on charges of abuse and suspicion of purchasing an abducted woman. Several high-ranking officials were punished and the Communist Party chief of Feng County was removed from his post.

== Administrative divisions ==
At present, Feng County has 14 towns.

The 14 towns are:

- Fengcheng (凤城镇)
- Shouxian (首羡镇)
- Shunhe (顺河镇)
- Changdian (常店镇)
- Huankou (欢口镇)
- Shizhai (师寨镇)
- Huashan (华山镇)
- Liangzhai (梁寨镇)
- Fanlou (范楼镇)
- Sunlou (孙楼镇)
- Songlou (宋楼镇)
- Dashahe (大沙河镇)
- Wanggou (王沟镇)
- Zhaozhuang (赵庄镇)

== Climate ==
Climate data for Fengxian, elevation 42 m (138 ft), (1991–2020 normals, extremes 1951–present)
Month	Jan	Feb	Mar	Apr	May	Jun	Jul	Aug	Sep	Oct	Nov	Dec	Year
Record high °C (°F)	18.4 (65.1)	25.7 (78.3)	32.2 (90.0)	33.7 (92.7)	37.1 (98.8)	40.7 (105.3)	40.5 (104.9)	38.3 (100.9)	35.7 (96.3)	34.7 (94.5)	29.5 (85.1)	21.9 (71.4)	40.7 (105.3)
Mean daily maximum °C (°F)	5.3 (41.5)	9.0 (48.2)	14.8 (58.6)	21.3 (70.3)	26.5 (79.7)	30.9 (87.6)	31.8 (89.2)	30.7 (87.3)	27.1 (80.8)	21.8 (71.2)	14.1 (57.4)	7.3 (45.1)	20.1 (68.1)
Daily mean °C (°F)	0.4 (32.7)	3.6 (38.5)	9.1 (48.4)	15.4 (59.7)	20.8 (69.4)	25.3 (77.5)	27.3 (81.1)	26.3 (79.3)	21.8 (71.2)	15.8 (60.4)	8.5 (47.3)	2.3 (36.1)	14.7 (58.5)
Mean daily minimum °C (°F)	−3.1 (26.4)	−0.5 (31.1)	4.3 (39.7)	10.1 (50.2)	15.5 (59.9)	20.3 (68.5)	23.7 (74.7)	22.9 (73.2)	17.7 (63.9)	11.3 (52.3)	4.3 (39.7)	−1.4 (29.5)	10.4 (50.8)
Record low °C (°F)	−20.3 (−4.5)	−19.0 (−2.2)	−8.1 (17.4)	−2.6 (27.3)	3.2 (37.8)	12.1 (53.8)	16.0 (60.8)	13.5 (56.3)	6.2 (43.2)	−2.0 (28.4)	−11.6 (11.1)	−15.7 (3.7)	−20.3 (−4.5)
Average precipitation mm (inches)	13.6 (0.54)	20.3 (0.80)	26.5 (1.04)	39.2 (1.54)	64.2 (2.53)	85.6 (3.37)	193.8 (7.63)	166.0 (6.54)	64.4 (2.54)	33.1 (1.30)	36.5 (1.44)	14.5 (0.57)	757.7 (29.84)
Average precipitation days (≥ 0.1 mm)	3.7	4.3	4.9	6.0	6.9	7.1	11.6	10.8	7.1	5.7	5.5	4.0	77.6
Average snowy days	3.1	2.6	0.8	0	0	0	0	0	0	0	0.8	1.7	9
Average relative humidity (%)	67	64	61	64	67	68	81	83	78	72	70	68	70
Mean monthly sunshine hours	152.5	153.2	196.8	218.6	232.9	211.7	198.3	193.0	184.8	186.8	163.0	154.3	2,245.9
Percentage possible sunshine	49	49	53	56	54	49	45	47	50	54	53	51	51
Source: China Meteorological Administration
