= Timeline of the Chu–Han Contention =

This is a timeline of the Chu–Han Contention.

Timeline of events
Year	Events
207 BC	A coalition rebel army led by Xiang Yu defeats Qin forces led by Zhang Han at the Battle of Julu.; End of the Qin dynasty: The last Qin emperor, Ziying, surrenders to Liu Bang.; Liu Bang occupies the Qin capital, Xianyang.
206 BC	Feast at Swan Goose Gate; Xiang Yu occupies Xianyang and sacks the city.; King Huai II of Chu becomes a figurehead emperor (Emperor Yi of Chu) and gets relocated to Chen County.; Xiang Yu divides the former Qin Empire into the Eighteen Kingdoms.; Xiang Yu declares himself Hegemon-King of Western Chu.; Liu Bang becomes King of Han.; Han Xin leaves Xiang Yu and joins Liu Bang.; War breaks out in the Qi territories: Tian Rong conquers the Kingdom of Qi. Tian Du, the King of Qi, takes shelter under Xiang Yu.; Tian Rong conquers the Kingdom of Jiaodong and kills its king, Tian Fu.; Xiang Yu kills Han Cheng, the King of Hán.; Zhang Liang joins Liu Bang.; Liu Bang appoints Han Xin as a general.; Tian Rong sends Peng Yue to conquer the Kingdom of Jibei and kill its king, Tian An.; Ying Bu, the King of Jiujiang, assassinates Emperor Yi of Chu.; Liu Bang's forces secretly pass through Chencang.
Start of the Chu–Han contention
Year	Events
206 BC	Zhang Han, the King of Yong, is defeated by Liu Bang's forces and retreats to Feiqiu.; Dong Yi, the King of Di, and Sima Xin, the King of Sai, surrender to Liu Bang.; Zang Tu, the King of Yan, kills Han Guang, the King of Liaodong.; Xiang Yu makes Zheng Chang the King of Hán to replace Han Cheng.; Zhao Tuo proclaims himself King of Nanyue.; Shen Yang, the King of Henan, surrenders to Liu Bang.; Rebellion in Zhao: Chen Yu conquers the Kingdom of Changshan. Zhang Er, the King of Changshan, takes shelter under Liu Bang.; Chen Yu helps Zhao Xie, the King of Dai, become the new King of Zhao. Chen Yu then replaces Zhao Xie as the King of Dai.; Hán Xin conquers the Kingdom of Hán with support from Liu Bang. Zheng Chang surrenders to Hán Xin.
205 BC	Xiang Yu attacks Tian Rong. Tian Rong retreats to Pingyuan and dies there. Xiang Yu makes Tian Jia the new King of Qi.; Wei Bao, the King of Wei, surrenders to Liu Bang.; Sima Ang, the King of Yin, is captured by Liu Bang's forces.; Tian Jia is defeated by Tian Heng, Tian Rong's younger brother.; Tian Jia is killed by Xiang Yu.; Tian Heng helps Tian Guang, Tian Rong's son, become the new King of Qi.; Battle of Pengcheng: Dong Yi and Sima Xin defect to Xiang Yu.; Sima Ang dies.; Peng Yue joins Liu Bang.; Battle of Jingsuo: Liu Bang occupies Xingyang and his forces start building supply routes linking Xingyang to Aocang.; Liu Bang makes his son, Liu Ying, his heir apparent.; Liu Bang's forces flood Feiqiu. Zhang Han commits suicide.; Battle of Anyi: Han Xin conquers the Kingdom of Dai and captures its chancellor, Xia Shuo.; Battle of Jingxing: Han Xin receives the surrender of the Kingdom of Yan.; Ying Bu, the King of Jiujiang, defects to Liu Bang.
204 BC	Xiang Yu attacks Liu Bang's supply lines in Xingyang and Aocang.; Xiang Yu dismisses Fan Zeng after falling for Chen Ping's ruse. Fan Zeng dies of illness on his journey home.; Battle of Xingyang: Wei Bao, the King of Wei, is killed by Zhou Ke and Zong Gong. Zhou Ke and Zong Gong die after Xingyang falls to Xiang Yu's forces.; Hán Xin, the King of Hán, is captured by Xiang Yu.; Yuan Sheng advises Liu Bang to attack Wan and Ye.; Peng Yue defeats Xiang Yu's forces at Xiapi.; Xiang Yu turns back to attack Peng Yue. Liu Bang uses the opportunity to capture Chenggao.; Xiang Yu defeats Peng Yue, conquers Xingyang, and besieges Liu Bang in Chenggao.; Liu Bang breaks out of the siege and escapes to the Kingdom of Zhao. Liu Bang takes over Han Xin and Zhang Er's command of his forces in Zhao territory.; Gong Ao, the King of Linjiang, dies and is succeeded by his son, Gong Wei.; Liu Bang sends Li Yiji to the Kingdom of Qi to persuade its king, Tian Guang, to surrender.; Battle of Si River: Cao Jiu, Dong Yi and Sima Xin commit suicide.; Liu Bang's forces conquer Chenggao.; Han Xin attacks the Kingdom of Qi and conquers Lixia and Linzi. Li Yiji is executed by Tian Guang.; Battle of Wei River: Long Ju is killed in action.; Tian Guang is killed while trying to escape. Tian Heng proclaims himself the King of Qi.; Liu Bang makes Zhang Er the King of Zhao.
203 BC	Liu Bang makes Han Xin and Ying Bu the kings of Qi and Huainan respectively.; Battle of Guling; Zhou Yin defects to Liu Bang.
202 BC	Battle of Gaixia; Xiang Yu commits suicide.
End of the Chu–Han contention
Year	Events
202 BC	Liu Bang rewards some of his subjects by granting them vassal king titles: Han Xin as the King of Chu; Peng Yue as the King of Liang; Hán Xin as the King of Hán; Wu Rui as the King of Changsha; Ying Bu as the King of Huainan; Zang Tu as the King of Yan; Zhang Er as the King of Zhao; Wuzhu as the King of Minyue; Liu Bang becomes emperor and establishes the Han dynasty as the ruling dynasty in China.; Liu Bang disbands the military and grants a general amnesty to convicts.; Zang Tu starts a rebellion.; Tian Heng, the former King of Qi, commits suicide in Luoyang.; Zhang Er dies and is succeeded by his son, Zhang Ao.; Liu Bang suppresses Zang Tu's rebellion and captures him.; Liu Bang's forces conquer the Kingdom of Linjiang and execute its king, Gong Wei.
