= Li Yiji =

Chinese philosopher and politician (268-204 BCE

- Born: 268 BCE; Qi County, Henan
- Died: 204 BCE (aged 64); Shandong
- Occupations: Adviser, scholar
- Children: Li Jie
- Relatives: Li Shang (brother)

Li Yiji (Note: Note that 食其 is read Yìjī instead of Shíqí in Mandarin. The Chinese character 食 is read yì in some ancient personal names, most notably this one. The Chinese character 基 was non-existent during the Han dynasty, as the 土 radical was only added later, so 其 was read jī during the Han dynasty, just like 基 in modern Chinese.) (酈食其; Lì Yìjī; 268–204 BC) was a Chinese scholar who served as an adviser to Liu Bang (Emperor Gaozu), the founding emperor of the Han dynasty. He is best known for helping Liu Bang gain control of Chenliu (present-day Kaifeng, Henan) during the rebellions towards the end of the Qin dynasty (c. 209–206 BC), and for advising Liu Bang to seize Aocang (in present-day Xingyang, Henan) during the Chu–Han Contention (206–202 BC). In 204 BC, Liu Bang sent him as an emissary to persuade Tian Guang, the King of Qi, to surrender. Li Yiji was initially successful, but was boiled alive by Tian Guang after the latter thought he had tricked him to buy time for Liu Bang's general Han Xin to attack Qi.

== Early life ==
Li Yiji was from Gaoyang County (高陽縣) in Chenliu Commandery (陳留郡), which is around present-day Qi County, Kaifeng, Henan. Known for being very studious, he was born in an impoverished family but managed to find a job as a low-ranking officer in the county office. During this time, he was described as a "crazy scholar" (狂生) and, despite his lowly status, the local elites did not dare to bully him.

Around 209 BC, when uprisings against the ruling Qin dynasty broke out, several rebel groups passed through Chenliu Commandery. Li Yiji felt that the leaders of these rebel groups were rather selfish, petty and opinionated. Thinking that they would be unreceptive to his advice, he decided to maintain a low profile and refused to join any of them.

== Meeting Liu Bang ==
When Liu Bang led his rebel group to Chenliu, he asked his men if they knew of any talents living in the area. At the time, one of Liu Bang's horsemen was the son of Li Yiji's neighbour, and he dropped by to visit Gaoyang. Li Yiji met the horseman and told him,

"I heard that the Duke of Pei (Note: Liu Bang was known as the Duke of Pei (沛公) at the time.) is arrogant and condescending, yet ambitious and far-sighted. He is someone I would like to follow, but I haven't found anyone to introduce me to him. When you see him, can you tell him this? "In my hometown, there is a Scholar Li who is around 60 years old and eight chi tall. People call him a 'crazy scholar', but he says he is not.""

The horseman replied, "The Duke of Pei dislikes (Confucian) scholars. When they visit him, he takes off their hats and urinates in them. He also yells at them. If you want to visit him, you can't say that you are a scholar." Li Yiji insisted that the horseman tell Liu Bang exactly what he had said, so the horseman did.

Liu Bang later came to Gaoyang and summoned Li Yiji to meet him at the local guesthouse. When Li Yiji showed up, he saw Liu Bang sitting on a bed and having his feet washed by two maids, so he did not kneel before Liu Bang and instead did a fist-and-palm gesture before asking, "Do you want to help Qin attack the rebels? Or do you want to lead the rebels to defeat Qin?"

Hearing that, Liu Bang scolded him, "Stupid scholar! Everyone has been suffering under Qin rule for a long time. This is why everyone is rising up against Qin! What do you mean when you ask if I want to help Qin attack the rebels?"

Li Yiji replied, "Of course, you want to rally everyone to rise up and destroy the barbaric Qin dynasty! Yet, you shouldn't be so disrespectful when you receive an elderly visitor."

Liu Bang immediately stopped washing his feet, tidied his clothes, and invited Li Yiji to take a seat before apologising for his rude behaviour. After Li Yiji shared his views on current affairs, Liu Bang was so pleased that he offered Li Yiji food and asked what he should do next. Li Yiji said,

"You have rallied supporters and gathered stragglers, but you don't have at least 10,000 men now. If you go into Qin territory like that, it will be akin to putting yourself in a tiger's maw. Chenliu is a strategic location as it is well-connected to other places and its counties are well-stocked with grain. I know the governor well. You may send me as your emissary to meet him and I will persuade him to surrender to you. If he refuses, you may then attack him and I will help you from the inside."

Liu Bang then heeded Li Yiji's advice and led his men to capture Chenliu. To honour Li Yiji for his achievement, Liu Bang gave him the title "Lord Guangye" (廣野君). Li Yiji's younger brother Li Shang also led a few thousand men to join Liu Bang in capturing the lands southwest of Chenliu. During this time, Li Yiji was often sent by Liu Bang as an emissary to meet the other rebel leaders.

== Service under Liu Bang during the Chu–Han Contention ==
After the Qin dynasty was overthrown in 206 BC, the empire was divided into the Eighteen Kingdoms. Liu Bang was made the ruler of the Kingdom of Han based in Hanzhong and Shu (present-day Sichuan and Chongqing). From 206 to 202 BC, a power struggle – historically known as the Chu–Han Contention – broke out between Liu Bang and his rival Xiang Yu, the King of Chu, for control over China. Li Yiji continued serving as an adviser under Liu Bang during this time.

In the autumn of 204 BC, Xiang Yu defeated Liu Bang at the Battle of Xingyang, forcing the latter to retreat to Gong County and Luoyang. At the time, Liu Bang's general Han Xin had defeated a rival kingdom Zhao, while Liu Bang's ally Peng Yue was raiding Xiang Yu's supply lines in the Liang lands; Xiang Yu had no choice but to split up his forces to deal with them. While Han Xin was attacking another rival kingdom Qi, Liu Bang felt tired of battling Xiang Yu at Xingyang and Chenggao, so he considered giving up the territories east of Chenggao and focus on fortifying his positions at Gong County and Luoyang.

When Li Yiji heard about it, he advised Liu Bang,

"I heard that those who understand Heaven's will become rulers, while those who fail to understand don't. People are of the greatest importance to rulers; the people see food as the most important thing to them. Aocang (Note: Aocang (敖倉) was located northwest of present-day Xingyang, Henan.) has been a place for stockpiling grain for a long time. I heard that it now contains a huge amount of grain. Chu forces have taken Xingyang, but they leave Aocang weakly defended and headed east instead. It is Heaven's will that Aocang should belong to Han. The Chu forces at Aocang are easy to defeat, yet we decide to retreat and give up the chance to take Aocang. Personally, I think this is a big mistake. The two great powers – Chu and Han – cannot coexist and have been in a stalemate for a long time. The people are not at peace; the empire is in chaos; farmers cannot farm; and weavers cannot weave. The people are unsure of which side to support in this war. I hope you will send troops to recapture Xingyang, claim the grain at Aocang, reinforce Chenggao, block the paths from the Taihang Mountains, defend Feihu Pass, (Note: Feihu Pass (蜚狐口) was a mountain pass located near present-day Laiyuan County and Yu County, Hebei.) and guard Boma Ford. (Note: Boma Ford (白馬津) was located in present-day Hua County, Henan.) By doing this, you will show the other rulers the reality of the situation, and everyone will have a better idea of which side they should support. As of now, the Yan and Zhao kingdoms have been pacified, and only the Qi Kingdom remains to be conquered. Tian Guang rules the vast territories of Qi; Tian Wen leads a Qi army of 200,000 at Licheng. The various branches of the Tian clan are also very influential. They have natural defences from the sea and rivers, and they share borders with Chu in the south. The people of Qi are very crafty and unpredictable. Even if you send an army of 100,000 to attack them, you might not be able to conquer Qi even after months or years. I request that you appoint me as your emissary to meet the King of Qi and persuade him to be a vassal of Han."

Liu Bang heeded Li Yiji's advice and approved his request.

== Persuading Tian Guang to surrender ==
When Li Yiji met Tian Guang, the King of Qi, he asked him, "Do you know who the people support?" After Tian Guang replied that he did not know, Li Yiji told him, "If you know, Qi will be safe. If you don't, Qi will be conquered." Tian Guang then asked, "So who do the people support?" Li Yiji replied, "(The Kingdom of) Han." Tian Guang asked, "Why do you say so?" Li Yiji replied,

"When the King of Han and Xiang Yu were fighting against the Qin dynasty, they had an agreement that whoever entered Xianyang first would be king. Although the King of Han got to Xianyang first, Xiang Yu disregarded their agreement and forced him to relocate to Hanzhong instead. When the King of Han heard that Xiang Yu had ordered the assassination of Emperor Yi, he immediately led his forces out of Shu to attack the Three Qins and come out of Hangu Pass in an attempt to save Emperor Yi. He wanted to gather the scattered forces, and make the descendants of the various kingdoms' royal families the rulers of their respective kingdoms. Whenever he conquered a city, he would immediately award titles to those who had contributed, and distribute the spoils of war among the troops. When he shares his gains with others, he attracts heroes and talents to serve under him. Many lords lead their men to pledge allegiance to him, and boats carrying food supplies keep coming from Shu. Xiang Yu has earned a bad reputation for not keeping his word and has become known for being unrighteous when he killed Emperor Yi. He doesn't remember people for their contributions, and holds grudges against those who had wronged him. His troops don't get rewards after victories and his followers don't receive titles for their contributions. He doesn't trust those who are not from his own clan. Even when he has title seals carved for his men who had made contributions, he plays with the seals to taunt them and refuse to give them. He would rather keep the spoils of war after a battle and not distribute them among his men. This is why everyone has turned against him. Talented people hate him and refuse to serve under him. Instead, they choose to follow the King of Han and take orders from him. The King of Han has led his forces out of Shu, pacified the Three Qins, conquered the lands west of Xihe, incorporated elite forces from Shangdang, conquered Jingxing, killed Lord Cheng'an, defeated Wei Bao, and occupied 32 cities. His army is like Chiyou's. Its strength doesn't come from people, but from Heaven's blessing. Now, we have obtained stores of grain from Aocang, reinforced Chenggao, guarded Boma Ford, blocked the paths from the Taihang Mountains, and defended Feihu Pass. Those who are thinking of surrendering last will be the first to be conquered. If you submit to the King of Han, the Kingdom of Qi will survive. If you don't, disaster will soon be upon you."

Tian Guang was convinced by Li Yiji's speech so he ordered his troops to withdraw from Licheng and threw a party for Li Yiji.

== Death ==
Meanwhile, Liu Bang's general Han Xin, who had been leading the invasion of Qi, was stunned to hear that Li Yiji had managed to get the Qi Kingdom, which had over 70 cities, to surrender just by using his oratorical skills. Heeding Kuai Tong's advice, Han Xin led his troops to attack Qi forces at Pingyuan at night.

When Tian Guang heard about Han Xin's attack, he thought that Li Yiji had tricked him to buy time for Han Xin to attack Qi. He threatened Li Yiji, "If you stop the Han forces, I will let you live. If not, I will boil you alive!" Li Yiji replied,

"Those who want to do great things will not be overly concerned with minor details. Those who have great virtue will not hesitate when they need to be decisive. I will speak no further on this."

Tian Guang then had Li Yiji boiled alive before he led his forces to retreat east.

== Descendants ==
In 195 BC, after Li Yiji's brother Li Shang helped Liu Bang suppress Ying Bu's rebellion, the emperor was rewarding his subjects for their contributions when he remembered Li Yiji. Li Yiji's son, Li Jie (酈疥), had fought in battles but his achievements were insufficient to earn him a marquis title. However, Liu Bang made an exemption on account of Li Jie's father and enfeoffed Li Jie as the hereditary Marquis of Gaoliang (高粱侯). The marquisate was passed down over three generations and renamed to Marquis of Wusui (武遂侯) at one point.

In 122 BC, Li Yiji's great-grandson Li Ping (酈平) attempted to trick Liu Ci (劉賜), the Prince of Hengshan, out of a hundred catty of gold but was caught and sentenced to death. He died of illness before his execution and the marquisate was disbanded.

== Anecdotes ==
The Chinese phrase "drinker from Gaoyang" (高陽酒徒), which originated from an anecdote about Li Yiji, is used to describe someone who indulges heavily in alcohol and behaves in a wanton and unrestrained manner. The anecdote says that when Li Yiji first came to meet Liu Bang, the latter refused to see him upon learning that he was a scholar, so Li Yiji told the sentry to introduce him as a "drinker from Gaoyang". When Liu Bang heard that, he invited Li Yiji to come in immediately.
