= Battle of Jingxing =

Battle in 205 BC

- Part of the Chu-Han contention
Date	October 205 BC
Location	Jingxing Pass, Hebei
Result	Han victory

Belligerents
Kingdom of Han	Kingdom of Zhao

Commanders and leaders
Han Xin	Chen Yu †; Zhao Xie †

Strength
30,000	200,000

The Battle of Jingxing (井陘之戰) was fought in October 205 BC between the army of Han, commanded by Han Xin, and a Zhao army led by King Zhao Xie of Zhao and Chen Yu, also known as the Lord of Cheng'an (成安君), who was serving as Zhao Xie's prime minister.

== Background ==
In late 209 BC, early in the rebellion that eventually overthrew the Qin dynasty, the Chu-born rebels Zhang Er and Chen Yu, who were sworn brothers, campaigned in northern China on behalf of the rebel king of "Rising Chu", Chen Sheng. They revived the Warring States-period State of Zhao and returned it to its traditional ruling dynasty, the Zhao, by finding and installing a member of the dynasty, Zhao Xie, as its new king.

However, during the winter of 208–207, Zhang Er and General-in-Chief Chen Yu fell out due to the latter's refusal to risk his army in battle against the large Qin army under Zhang Han and Wang Yi during the Qin siege of Julu, where Zhang Er and Zhao Xie were trapped. The revived State of Qi and State of Yan also sent armies to assist Julu, but the generals present similarly avoided battle. In January 207, the Chu rebel Xiang Yu succeeded in lifting the siege and defeating the Qin generals, and he subsequently used his victory to assert his leadership over the other rebel armies present, forging a grand rebel-coalition. Meanwhile, Chen Yu quarreled with Zhang Er and resigned his command as Zhao's general-in-chief.

In January 206, after the overthrow of the Qin, Xiang Yu chose to divide-and-rule the revived kingdoms of the Warring States period as new weaker states that owed their allegiance to him, dividing China into the Eighteen Kingdoms. He also wanted to reward the rebel generals whom he deemed most deserving. As part of this arrangement, he divided Zhao into the kingdoms of Dai and Changshan. He made Zhang Er the king of Changshan, which was the Zhao heartland, appointed Zhao Xie as the king of Dai, which was Zhao's northern border region, and he made Chen Yu the Marquis of Nanpi.

The Eighteen Kingdoms was a fragile settlement from the beginning, and Chen Yu was discontent with the arrangement. Later in the year, the Qi general Tian Rong forcibly reunited the State of Qi after it had similarly been divided into three kingdoms ruled by three other men, and Chen Yu, encouraged by this, asked Tian for reinforcements to assist him in overthrowing Zhang Er. Tian Rong agreed, and Chen Yu attacked and defeated Zhang Er, restoring Changshan to the rule of Zhao Xie. Zhao Xie rewarded Chen Yu by making him the king of Dai, but Chen Yu left the governance of Dai to its Prime Minister Xia Yue, remaining with Zhao Xie to assist him directly. Zhang Er fled to Liu Bang, the king of Han, who in August had begun his struggle against Xiang Yu for control over China by having his General-in-Chief Han Xin invade Guanzhong (the Three Qins).

In early 205, Zhao Xie and Chen Yu sided with Liu Bang against Xiang Yu, as they had rebelled against the Eighteen Kingdoms-arrangement of the latter. Moreover, at Chen Yu's request, Liu Bang had sent him what he claimed to be the head of Zhang Er. However, the alliance with Liu Bang quickly came to an end. In April Liu Bang's army, reinforced with Zhao soldiers, suffered a major defeat to Xiang Yu in the Battle of Pengcheng, and around the same time Chen Yu discovered that Zhang Er was still alive. Thus, Zhao broke its alliance with Liu Bang.

== Han Invasion ==
In the aftermath of Liu Bang's defeat at Pengcheng, Han Xin formulated his strategy to conquer the kingdoms of northern China. This strategy aimed to secure the manpower, food and wealth of northern China for Liu Bang while keeping Xiang Yu himself distracted in China's Central Plain. This was achieved by basing Liu Bang in the Central Plain in Xingyang and Chenggao, as the feud between Liu Bang and Xiang Yu, two former sworn brothers, was both political and personal. Moreover, Xiang Yu would be unable to attack the Han administration in Guanzhong without endangering his line of retreat by marching past Xingyang and Chenggao.

After conquering the State of Wei in the summer of 205, Han Xin proceeded north-east against the State of Dai, marching with Zhang Er in tow, who could help in mustering support. When Han Xin marched on the city of Wuxian from the east, thus approaching the city from an unexpected direction, Dai’s Prime Minister Xia Yue sought to block his advance but was defeated and killed. Han Xin then ordered his best general Cao Shen to besiege Wuxian while he and Zhang Er marched against Zhao itself. Cao Shen captured Wuxian, but in the meantime, Liu Bang had ordered that most of Han Xin’s best soldiers be sent south to assist in the Xinyang-Chenggao theatre, including Cao Shen. Han Xin complied.

Rather than be contented with the conquest of Wei and Dai, Han Xin refused to abandon the attack on Zhao. He proceeded eastward towards the Taihang Mountains, at the end of which was Jingxing Pass, a point of entry into the Zhao heartland. Meanwhile, the large royal army of Zhao, led by Zhao Xie and Chen Yu, positioned itself at the eastern end of the pass. The Lord of Guangwu, Li Zuoju, counseled Chen Yu to block off the important routes across the Taihang Mountains, especially the Jingxing Pass, and to cut off Han Xin's rear once he had entered the mountains. In this way, the Han army, being far from home, would suffer from logistics problems and disintegrate without a battle.

However, Chen Yu, who was a Confucian and prided himself as commanding with righteousness, responded that he had no desire to win through ignoble means, and that he also had no need for such a strategy, since his army was so superior to that of Han Xin. Secondarily, Chen Xi commanded more troops in the north while Liu Bang’s battered army, returning from Pengcheng, was not completely broken and could still reinforce Han Xin. Chen Xu decided that a swift battle to destroy Han Xin’s army was in his interest before the Han forces could be reinforced. In addition to not trusting anyone else with a significant portion of his army to trap Han Xin with, he also pointed out that they would be viewed by others with contempt if they resorted to defeating such an inferior force through indirect means. Indeed, while Han Xin was a successful general who had defeated the kings of the Three Qins (including the formidable Zhang Han), and the State of Wei, some of the Zhao army’s generals had served in the elite armies of previous Zhao monarchs, and its soldiers included men who had served in the rebellion against Qin, including the battle of the Yushui River, Xiang Yu’s final victory over Zhang Han in 207. The Zhao army was both larger and contained a greater number of experienced troops than that of Han Xin. As for its general Chen Yu, he was resourceful and had defeated Qin forces as well as his rivals Li Liang and Zhang Er. Chen Yu thus had little reason to resort to indirect means. Han Xin had sent spies into the enemy camp to ascertain the plans of the Zhao leadership, and learning that he would not be cut off, in October he advanced into the mountains.

== Preparation ==
As the forces of Han Xin reached the Jingxing Pass, they saw the Zhao army encamped on the plain outside the pass. In the middle of the night, Han Xin sent 2000 picked light cavalry to exit the Taihang Mountains along a goat track and wait in the mountains behind the Zhao camp, with orders to seize the Zhao camp when the opportunity presented itself.

Before dawn, Han Xin had his troops eat a simple breakfast before the battle, stating that they would feast upon destroying the Zhao army. Not even his officers believed him, but they followed his orders. He then sent an advance force of 10,000 men through the pass of Jingxing into the plain and ordered them to take up position with their backs against the Mienman River. Sima Qian claims that Han Xin correctly judged that Chen Yu would allow this, since if Zhao attacked right away it would simply scare the advance guard back into the pass before Han Xin and the greater part of the Han army could appear. Sima Qian claims that the Zhao soldiers laughed at the fact that the Han were placing themselves in such a vulnerable position, with their backs to the river, but the fact that the maneuver was conducted at night may also explain Zhao inaction against Han Xin's opening move.

== Battle ==
At dawn, after the advance guard had taken up position, Han Xin and the rest of the army then exited the pass displaying the banners and drums of the general-in-chief (Han Xin's office). At this, Chen Yu ordered his army to attack, and Han Xin's main force, which presumably included many of his remaining veterans, fought for some time before conducting a feigned retreat towards the position of the advance guard on the river, abandoning some of their flags and drums. The advance guard then 'opened' to receive their comrades, either opening their ranks or their barricades (if they had built an ad hoc fortified position). The Zhao followed the retreating forces and clashed with the Han against the river. However, besides instilling a fight-to-the-death mentality in the Han soldiers, the river-side position was also very difficult to flank.

The contemptuous Zhao poured more and more troops against the Han position, leaving their camp vulnerable. Observing this development, Han Xin's light cavalry force then seized the Zhao camp and hung up the red banners of Han. The Zhao soldiers tired and began to withdraw, but as they turned around they saw the banners of Han hanging from the barricades of their camp. This induced panic in the Zhao troops, and Han Xin used this to order a counter-attack with the main force. The Zhao army soon collapsed. As the remnants of the Zhao army fled, Chen Yu was eventually caught on the Zhi River (泜水) and was killed in action. Han Xin then pursued king Zhao Xie to Xiangguo and killed him there.

The strategy at Jingxing gave rise to a saying, "fighting a battle with one's back facing a river" (背水一戰), and the Japanese saying, "position with one's back to the water" (背水の陣).

== Aftermath ==
At the feast after the battle, Han Xin's officers, still somewhat incredulous at their own good fortune, inquired into the rationale for the astounding deployments. Han Xin explained that as he was commanding a smaller army consisting of many inexperienced troops, and that he himself was not a general of high renown, he had to resort to such drastic measures to force everyone to fight hard. That led to this saying: "You achieve survival by fighting from a position of certain death (置之死地而後生)".

The victory at Jingxing in October 205 likely helped to persuade Ying Bu, the king of Jiujiang and an ally of Xiang Yu, to defect to Liu Bang in November. It also helped to convince Zang Tu, king of the State of Yan, to join Liu Bang's side. However, the victory did not complete the Han conquest of Zhao. Rather, in 204 Han Xin continued to campaign in Zhao, winning two more battles against the Zhao at Zhaoko and at a location no longer recorded, and capturing the Zhao capital of Handan. Xiang Yu sent Chu forces at least twice into Zhao to wrest control of the state, but Han Xin crushed these forces as well. Liu Bang then ordered many of Han Xin's troops and officers to return to the Central Plain to serve directly under Liu Bang. He made Zhang Er king of Zhao and ordered Han Xin to raise a new army from the inhabitants of Zhao to attack the State of Qi. This new campaign began in late 204 and culminated in the Battle of Wei River.

== See also ==
- Timeline of the Chu–Han Contention
