= Chu–Han Contention =

Civil war in China (206–202 BCE)

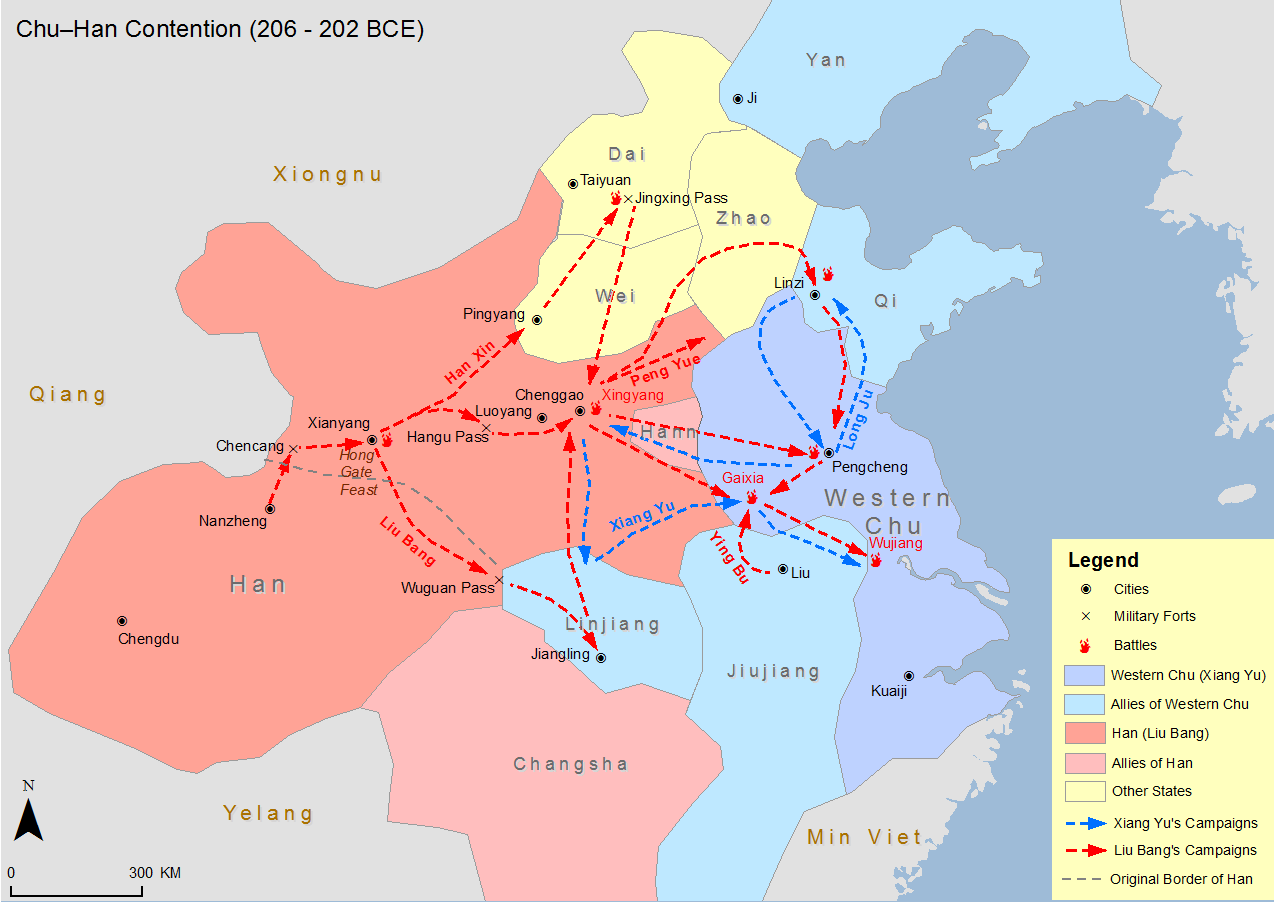
- Territories and troop movements of the Chu–Han Contention
Date	206–202 BCE
Location	China
Result	Han victory

Belligerents
Han	Western Chu; Three Qins; Western Wei	Qi; Zhao

Commanders and leaders
Liu Bang; Han Xin; Zhang Liang; Ying Bu; Peng Yue; Zhang Er	Xiang Yu †; Long Ju †; Zhongli Mo; Cao Jiu †; Fan Zeng; Zhang Han †; Dong Yi †; Sima Xin †; Wei Bao (executed)	Tian Rong †; Zhao Xie †; Chen Yu (executed)

Chu–Han Contention
- Traditional Chinese: 楚漢戰爭
- Simplified Chinese: 楚汉战争
Transcriptions
Standard Mandarin
- Hanyu Pinyin: Chǔ Hàn zhànzhēng
- Bopomofo: ㄔㄨˇㄏㄢˋㄓㄢˋㄓㄥ
- IPA: [ʈʂʰù xân ʈʂân.ʈʂə́ŋ]
Yue: Cantonese
- Jyutping: Co2 Hon3 zin3-zang1

The Chu–Han Contention (楚漢相爭), also known as the Chu–Han War (楚漢戰爭), was an interregnum of civil wars in Imperial China between the fall of the Qin dynasty in 206 BCE and the establishment of the Han dynasty in 202 BCE.

After the Qin dynasty was overthrown, the empire was divided into the Eighteen Kingdoms, ruled by enfeoffed rebel leaders and surrendered Qin generals according to the arrangement by Xiang Yu, the hegemon warlord. Due to dissatisfaction among the rebels, wars and rebellions soon broke out, most prominently between two major powers, Xiang Yu and Liu Bang, who were the rulers of the Western Chu and Han kingdoms, respectively. Other kingdoms also waged war against Chu and Han and among themselves, but these were largely insignificant compared to the Chu-Han conflict. The wars ended with a total victory to Liu Bang at the Battle of Gaixia, during which Xiang Yu committed suicide after losing all his men in a last stand. Having subdued all rival contenders, Liu Bang subsequently proclaimed himself emperor of the newly established Han dynasty.

== Background ==
Towards the end of the Warring States period, the western state of Qin conquered the other six states – Hán, Zhao, Yan, Wei, Chu and Qi – and unified China under the Qin dynasty in 221 BCE, and King Zheng of Qin declared himself the First Emperor of China. After his untimely death during the fifth imperial tour in 210 BCE, the chief eunuch Zhao Gao conspired with chancellor Li Si to install the incompetent Prince Huhai as the new emperor, forcing the suicide of the then-heir apparent Prince Fusu and purging anyone deemed disobedient in the Qin court. Due to Huhai's corrupt rule, a massive uprising led by Chen Sheng and Wu Guang broke out in Dazexiang (modern day Yongqiao District, Anhui) in 209 BC, and lasted five months until Qin forces finally managed to crush the rebellion with a hastily organized army of penal troopers led by General Zhang Han.

Although the Dazexiang uprising had failed, other rebellions erupted consecutively over the next three years. The leaders of these rebellions were either pretenders of the former six states conquered by Qin, old noblemen and gentries who sought to revert China back to the political order of a pre-Qin decentralized federacy, or simply opportunists who wanted to exploit the chaos for self-advancement. Among them, the most notable young rebel was Xiang Yu, who descended from an aristocrat family of Chu generals and initially followed the rebellion of his uncle Xiang Liang, wanting to revive the Chu state with the exiled King Huai II as its nominal ruler. Another notable Chu rebel leader was Liu Bang, a rural sheriff from Pei County who had formed his own rebel group with his associates, many of whom, like Liu, were local civil servants within the Qin bureaucracy before the rebellion. Liu Bang, who came from a grassroots background, had initially joined the Xiang Liang, but quickly became a rebel leader on par with the Xiang Clan within the Chu camp due to his personal charisma and willingness to befriend anyone as allies.

In August 208 BC, Xiang Liang, the supreme commander of the Chu rebels at the time, was defeated and killed in action at Dingtao by Zhang Han. In the fallout of the defeat, Xiang Yu and Liu Bang relocated King Huai II from Xuyi to a new capital in Pengcheng (彭城; present-day Xuzhou, Jiangsu). In September, King Huai II ordered all the Chu leaders to attack different Qin fronts, promising them that anyone who first invaded Guanzhong, the heartland of the Qin dynasty, could lawfully claim the whole region as fief under the title "King of Guanzhong". Xiang Yu was assigned to the northern front initially as a deputy general under Song Yi, who took over the late Xiang Liang's post as supreme commander, but he soon mutinied and killed Song under the accusation of treasonous cowardice. Xiang Yu then led an outnumbered Chu forces to a surprise victory over Zhang Han's Qin army at the Battle of Julu, and after the battle controlled nine commanderies in the former Liang, and Chu territories.

=== Fall of the Qin dynasty ===
While the bulk of the Qin forces were up north fighting Xiang Yu at Julu, Liu Bang led his forces west into the Guanzhong region via the Wu Pass, facing minimal resistance along the way due to his clever use of diplomacy, bribery and surprise attacks against the demoralized Qin defenders. By October 207 BCE, his army had overcome the last significant resistance in Lantian and arrived at the outskirts of the Qin capital Xianyang. Meanwhile, in the Qin royal court, Zhao Gao had committed treason by forcing King Huhai to commit suicide, and installed another prince Ziying as a puppet ruler. Ziying, however, hated Zhao Gao intensely and soon plotted with eunuchs to have him assassinated and his three clans exterminated. With Liu Bang's forces approaching unopposed, Ziying decided to surrender the capital, bringing an end to the Qin dynasty. Liu Bang treated Ziying respectfully and entered Xianyang peacefully, forbidding his troops from harming civilians and looting the capital, citing that the Qin people were also victims of the empire's tyrannical rule and thus should not be unjustly punished. He then publicly proclaimed that all harsh Qin laws were to be abolished except strict punishments for murder, harm and theft, earning him the love of the Qin citizens. His deputy Xiao He had the Qin code of law and all of its archives and government documents collected and relocated for preservation.

However, when Xiang Yu eventually arrived as well, he immediately besieged and captured the Hangu Pass garrisoned by Liu Bang's troops out of frustration that Liu Bang had the easier route and stole all the glory. Liu Bang was then pressured into ceding the Guanzhong region to Xiang Yu despite the earlier agreement between them. When Liu Bang personally visited to pay respect and apology, Xiang Yu also attempted to assassinate him at the Feast at Swan Goose Gate under the advice of Fan Zeng, but Liu Bang escaped thanks to his humble courtesy and Xiang Yu's indecisiveness when confronted by Liu Bang's brother-in-law Fan Kuai. Xiang Yu then entered Xianyang, allowing his troops to pillage and plunder the city, ordered the burning of the Epang Palace, and had all the surrendered Qin royalties executed. Later, Xiang Yu forced Liu Bang to accept the enfeoffment of the remote Bashu region (present-day Sichuan Basin), which was then very underdeveloped and mainly used as penal colonies for exiled criminals. After lobbying by Liu Bang's friend Zhang Liang, a Hán aristocrat widely respected among the rebels for previously attempting to ambush and assassinate the First Emperor in 218 BC, Xiang Yu reluctantly added the better developed Hanzhong Basin to Liu Bang's fiefs, arguing that it now fulfilled the promise of "King of Guanzhong" as Hanzhong was connected to the region via mountain passes within the Qinling Mountains. As Liu Bang's forces relocated into the new fief, Xiang Yu had his troops following them as "escort", and Liu Bang resorted to burning the gallery roads behind his convoy as a precautionary measure to prevent being attacked in the rear and as a diplomatic gesture of accepting Xiang Yu's arrangement to never return again.

Xiang Yu then divided the former Qin Empire into numerous regional states collectively known as the Eighteen Kingdoms, each ruled by either a rebel leader or a surrendered Qin general, with the Kingdom of Chu being the hegemon holding the nominal suzerain power over the other kingdoms. Xiang Yu also honoured King Huai II with a higher title, "Emperor Yi of Chu", and declared himself "Hegemon-King of Western Chu". Shortly after that, he exiled the figurehead Emperor Yi to Chen County (郴縣, present-day Chenzhou, Hunan), and secretly ordered his ally Ying Bu, the King of Jiujiang, to intercept and assassinate the emperor along the way.

== Initial stages ==
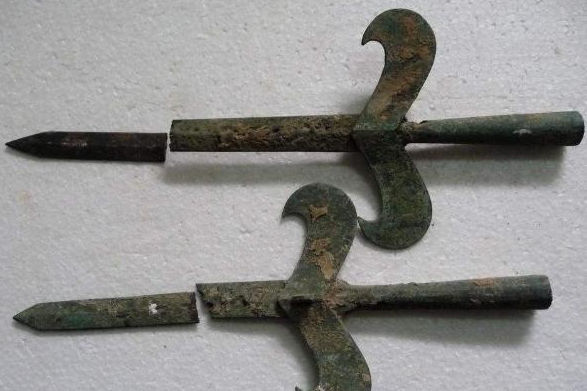
Trident polearm, Han dynasty

Xiang Yu's arrangement of the Eighteen Kingdoms sowed significant dissatisfaction among the anti-Qin rebels as it was marred by cronyism, with many rebel leaders who were either not favored by Xiang Yu or merely absent during the appointment (as they were garrisoned far away from Guanzhong) receiving little to no fiefs at all. His enfeoffment of the Guanzhong region (which rightfully should have been Liu Bang's) to three surrendered Qin generals Zhang Han, Sima Xin and Dong Yi (collectively known as the Three Qins), who were widely seen as traitors by the Qin people after the sacking of Xianyang, essentially destabilized three of the Eighteen Kingdoms from the start. Moreover, the instigated assassination of Emperor Yi, and Xiang Yu's personal arrogance over battlefield prowess and lack of respect for those deemed beneath him further added to the dissents.

=== Rebellions in Qi, Zhao and Yan ===
Merely six months after Qin dynasty's collapse, Tian Rong, a Qi state noble and rebel leader, was unhappy with how the Qi territories had been split among three kingdoms – Qi, Jiaodong and Jibei, collectively known as the Three Qis – and himself not receiving anything due to grudges with Xiang Yu, so he waged war against the other kingdoms. He killed Tian Shi, the King of Jiaodong, and Tian An, the King of Jibei. Tian Du, the King of Qi, was defeated by Tian Rong so he fled and joined Xiang Yu. Tian Rong gained control of the Three Qis and became the ruler of the Qi territories.

Tian Rong contacted Peng Yue, a grassroots rebel leader who also didn't go to Guanzhong to be enfeoffed and ended up with his territory claimed by Xiang Yu, and formed an alliance against Xiang Yu. At the same time, he sent troops to support Chen Yu, who had started a rebellion in the former state of Zhao. In 205 BCE, Chen Yu defeated Zhang Er, the King of Changshan, and seized control of his kingdom. Chen Yu then installed Zhao Xie, the King of Dai, as the new ruler of the Zhao territories.

Upon learning of the rebellions in Qi and Zhao, Xiang Yu led his forces north to deal with the rebels. Meanwhile, further in the north, Zang Tu, the King of Yan, killed Han Guang, the King of Liaodong, seized the latter's lands and proclaimed himself the ruler of the Yan territories.

=== Han conquest of the Three Qins ===
While Xiang Yu was away and busy dealing with the northern rebellions, Liu Bang, who was never happy with the fiefs forcefully appointed to him, seized the opportunity to attack the Three Qins' territories in Guanzhong. During the few months settling in Hanzhong, Liu Bang's deputy Xiao He discovered a talented military commander named Han Xin, and convinced Liu Bang to make him the grand marshall. Han Xin proposed a strategy of pretending to reconstruct the previously burnt gallery roads in order to draw the Three Qins' attention towards the mountain passes south of Xianyang, while his main forces secretly took a western detour to invade Guanzhong through Chencang (present-day Baoji, Shaanxi) and surprise the Three Qins. The plan was a huge success, and Han Xin defeated the hastily regrouped Zhang Han, the King of Yong, in two consecutive battles.

Riding on the tide of victory, Liu Bang proceeded to conquer Longxi (the area in present-day eastern Gansu located west of Mount Long), Beidi (northeastern Gansu and Ningxia) and Shang (around present-day Yulin). He also sent his men to retrieve his family in Pei (present-day Xuzhou, Jiangsu) and bring them to him from territories controlled by Western Chu.

Upon receiving news of Liu Bang's attacks, Xiang Yu sent an army to Yangjia (陽夏; present-day Taikang County, Henan) to block Liu Bang's forces; he also appointed Zheng Chang as the King of Hán to help him cover his flank.

=== Battle of Pengcheng ===
In 205 BCE, after conquering the Three Qins in the Guanzhong region, Liu Bang advanced to the east of Hangu Pass to prepare for an attack on the Henan region. Sima Xin, the King of Sai, Dong Yi, the King of Di, and Shen Yang, the King of Henan, surrendered to Liu Bang. Zheng Chang, the King of Hán, refused to submit to Liu Bang, so Liu Bang sent Hán Xin to attack and defeat him. Liu Bang then replaced Zheng Chang with Hán Xin as the new King of Hán. Zhang Er, the former King of Changshan, joined Liu Bang after losing his domain to Zhao Xie and Chen Yu.

In April–May 205 BCE, Liu Bang attacked Henei with help from Wei Bao, the King of Western Wei. When Liu Bang received news that Xiang Yu had ordered the assassination of Emperor Yi, he held a memorial service for the emperor and accused Xiang Yu of committing regicide, using this incident as political propaganda to justify his war against Xiang Yu.

In May–June 205 BCE, Xiang Yu defeated Tian Rong at Chengyang (城陽; around present-day Ju County, Shandong). Tian Rong was killed while retreating to Pingyuan (around present-day northwestern Shandong). Although the Kingdom of Qi had surrendered, Xiang Yu still allowed his troops to plunder and loot the Qi territories. Tian Rong's younger brother, Tian Heng, made Tian Rong's son Tian Guang the new King of Qi, and continued to put up resistance against Xiang Yu.

Meanwhile, Liu Bang had mustered an army of about 560,000 with support from the kings who had surrendered to him. In September–October 205 BCE, the Chu capital, Pengcheng (彭城; present-day Xuzhou, Jiangsu), fell to a coalition force led by Liu Bang. When Xiang Yu received news that Liu Bang had occupied Pengcheng, he led 30,000 troops to retake Pengcheng. Liu Bang was caught off guard. His army suffered heavy casualties, and his family members were captured by Chu forces. After the battle, Liu Bang lost his territorial gains in Chu and the support of his allies.

=== Battle of Jingsuo ===
After their defeat at Pengcheng, the strength of the Han forces decreased drastically. Liu Bang's family members were captured by Xiang Yu's forces and kept as hostages. Many of the kings who had surrendered to Liu Bang earlier defected to Xiang Yu's side after Liu Bang's defeat. The rulers of Qi and Zhao also requested to make peace with Xiang Yu.

Upon reaching Xiayi (下邑; east of present-day Dangshan County, Anhui), which was guarded by his brother-in-law, Liu Bang reorganised his troops for a retreat. Meanwhile, Han Xin led reinforcements from Guanzhong into central China and defeated a Chu army between Jing County (京縣) and Suo Village (索亭), both in present-day Henan. He also put down a rebellion by Wang Wu and Cheng Chu – former Qin generals – and Shen Tu, the magistrate of Wei, and captured their base at Waihuang (外黃; in present-day Minquan County, Henan). He and Liu Bang reorganised the Han army and established strong Han garrisons in Xingyang and Chenggao. Han Xin also developed his plan to conquer northern China, with the aim that Xiang Yu would be too distracted by Liu Bang and his bases of Xingyang and Chenggao to properly counter Han Xin in the north, nor could he endanger his line of retreat by marching past Xingyang and Chenggao into Guanzhong.

Liu Bang then sent a messenger to meet Ying Bu, the King of Jiujiang, to persuade Ying Bu to support him. In November 205 BCE, after Han Xin's victory at the Battle of Jingxing, Ying Bu agreed to join Liu Bang and rebelled against Xiang Yu. Upon learning about it, Xiang Yu sent Long Ju to attack Ying Bu.

In July–August 205 BCE, Liu Bang named his son Liu Ying as his heir apparent and put him in charge of Yueyang (櫟陽; present-day Yanliang District, Xi'an). Shortly after, Han forces conquered Feiqiu (廢丘; present-day Xingping, Shaanxi), which was guarded by Zhang Han, who committed suicide after his defeat.

On another front, Ying Bu was unable to resist Long Ju's attacks, so he abandoned his domain in Jiujiang and joined Liu Bang.

== Northern front ==
=== Battle of Anyi ===
In 205 BCE, Wei Bao left Liu Bang on the pretext of visiting an ill relative and secretly returned to his domain. He pledged allegiance to Xiang Yu and rebelled against Liu Bang. Liu Bang sent Li Yiji to persuade Wei Bao to surrender, but Wei Bao refused, so Liu Bang ordered Han Xin to attack Wei Bao.

Wei Bao stationed his army at Puban (蒲阪; present-day Yongji, Shanxi) and blocked the route to Linjin (臨晉; present-day Dali County, Shaanxi). Han Xin tricked Wei Bao into believing that he was planning to attack Linjin, while secretly sending a force from Xiayang (夏陽; present-day Hancheng, Shaanxi) to cross the river and attack Anyi (安邑; present-day Xia County, Shanxi).

In October–November 205 BCE, Wei Bao personally led an attack on Han Xin but lost the battle and was captured. When he surrendered, Liu Bang accepted his surrender and appointed him as a general. Within the same month, Han Xin attacked the Kingdom of Dai with support from Zhang Er, the former King of Changshan, and scored a decisive victory, capturing the Dai chancellor Xia Shuo.

=== Battle of Jingxing ===
After achieving victory over the Kingdom of Dai, Han Xin and Zhang Er attacked the Kingdom of Zhao at Jingxing Pass. Zhao Xie, the King of Zhao, and his chancellor, Chen Yu, led an army of 200,000 to resist the Han forces. Li Zuoche, a Zhao general, proposed a plan to trap Han Xin within ten days: he would lead 30,000 men to disrupt Han Xin's supply route and block his return route, while Chen Yu would defend the frontline firmly and prevent Han Xin from advancing. Chen Yu refused to follow Li Zuoche's plan.

The evening before the battle, Han Xin sent 2,000 horsemen, each carrying a flag of the Han army, to station near the Zhao camp. The next morning, Han Xin feigned defeat in a skirmish with Zhao forces and lured them to follow him, while his 2,000 men took advantage of the situation to capture the weakly defended Zhao camp. Meanwhile, the Zhao soldiers retreated after failing to conquer Han Xin's fort, and were surprised to see that their camp had been occupied by Han forces when they returned. The Zhao army fell into chaos, and Han Xin seized the opportunity to launch a counterattack and scored a victory. Chen Yu was killed in action, while Zhao Xie and Li Zuoche were captured.

=== Battle of Wei River ===
In 204 BCE, after the Kingdom of Yan had surrendered to him, Liu Bang made Zhang Er the new King of Zhao. Xiang Yu constantly sent his forces to attack the Kingdom of Zhao, but Han Xin and Zhang Er managed to hold their ground. Xiang Yu then turned his attention towards Xingyang, where Liu Bang was stationed. Liu Bang was forced to retreat to Chenggao, but he eventually abandoned Chenggao and headed north of the Yellow River to where Han Xin was. In a surprise move, Liu Bang seized control over the troops under Han Xin's command and ordered Han Xin to attack the Kingdom of Qi.

Just as Han Xin was preparing to attack Qi, Liu Bang sent Li Yiji to persuade Tian Guang, the King of Qi, to surrender. However, Liu Bang had not informed Han Xin about what he had sent Li Yiji to do. Meanwhile, Tian Guang had decided to surrender to Liu Bang, so he had pulled back his forces from Lixia (歷下; present-day Jinan, Shandong). However, as Han Xin did not know that Tian Guang had the intention of surrendering, he followed Kuai Tong's advice and launched an attack on the retreating Qi forces, conquering Lixia and attacking the Qi capital Linzi. Tian Guang thought that Li Yiji had lied to him to distract him from Han Xin's attacks, so he had Li Yiji boiled alive. Then, he retreated to Gaomi and requested aid from Xiang Yu. In the meantime, Han Xin conquered Linzi and continued to pursue the retreating Qi forces to Gaomi.

Xiang Yu sent Long Ju to lead 200,000 troops to help Tian Guang. After Han Xin defeated Long Ju in battle, Long Ju was advised to focus on strengthening his defences and getting Tian Guang to rally support from the fallen Qi territories. However, Long Ju decided not to heed the advice and insisted on attacking Han Xin. On the night before the battle, Han Xin sent his men to dam the Wei River (濰水; in present-day Weifang, Shandong) with sandbags.

The next morning, after a skirmish with Chu forces, Han Xin feigned defeat and retreated to lure the enemy to follow him. After about a quarter of the Chu forces had crossed the river, Han Xin signalled to his men to open the dam. Many Chu soldiers drowned, and Long Ju was isolated with only a fraction of his forces. Taking advantage of the situation, Han Xin launched a counterattack. Long Ju was killed in action, and the rest of the Chu forces disintegrated as Han Xin continued pressing the attack. Tian Guang fled while Han Xin pursued the retreating Chu forces to Chengyang (城陽; near present-day Ju County, Shandong).

After his victory, Han Xin swiftly took control of the Qi territories and sent a messenger to Liu Bang, requesting that Liu Bang make him the new King of Qi. At the time, Liu Bang was under attack by Xiang Yu in Xingyang and was eagerly awaiting reinforcements from Han Xin. Initially, he was furious when he received Han Xin's request. However, he eventually acted on the advice of Zhang Liang and Chen Ping, and reluctantly approved Han Xin's request. At the same time, Xiang Yu felt worried after losing Long Ju, so he sent Wu She to incite Han Xin to rebel against Liu Bang and declare himself king. However, despite Kuai Tong's urging, Han Xin refused to betray Liu Bang. Han Xin later organised an army to move southward and attack Xiang Yu.

== Battle of Chenggao and the Treaty of Hong Canal ==
On the southern front, Liu Bang's forces started building supply routes from Xingyang to Aocang (敖倉; northwest of Xingyang, Henan). In 204 BCE, after sustaining losses from Chu attacks on the routes, Liu Bang's forces ran short of supplies so Liu Bang negotiated for peace with Xiang Yu and agreed to cede the lands east of Xingyang to Xiang Yu. Xiang Yu wanted to accept Liu Bang's offer, but Fan Zeng advised him to reject and use the opportunity to destroy Liu Bang. Xiang Yu changed his mind, pressed the attack on Xingyang and besieged Liu Bang's forces inside the city. Liu Bang heeded Chen Ping's suggestion to bribe Xiang Yu's men with 40,000 catties of gold for them to spread rumours that Fan Zeng had betrayed Xiang Yu. Xiang Yu fell for the ruse and dismissed Fan Zeng.

In late 204 BCE, while Xiang Yu was away suppressing the rebellion in Qi, Li Yiji had advised Liu Bang to use the opportunity to attack Xiang Yu. Liu Bang's forces conquered Chenggao and defeated the Chu army led by Cao Jiu near the Si River. Liu Bang's forces advanced further until they reached Guangwu (廣武; present-day Guangwu Town, Xingyang, Henan). Chu forces led by Zhongli Mo were trapped by Han forces to the east of Xingyang. Following Han Xin's victory at the Battle of Wei River, the Chu forces' morale fell, and they ran short of supplies months later. Xiang Yu had no choice but to request to make peace with Liu Bang and release Liu Bang's family members, whom he had been holding hostage. Xiang Yu and Liu Bang then agreed to a ceasefire at the Treaty of Hong Canal, which divided China into east and west under the Chu and Han domains, respectively.

== End of the war ==
In 203 BCE, while Xiang Yu was retreating eastward, Liu Bang, acting on the advice of Zhang Liang and Chen Ping, renounced the Treaty of Hong Canal and ordered an attack on Xiang Yu. He also requested assistance from Han Xin and Peng Yue to attack Xiang Yu simultaneously from three directions. However, as Han Xin and Peng Yue did not mobilise their troops, Liu Bang was defeated by Xiang Yu at Guling (固陵; south of present-day Taikang County, Henan) and forced to retreat and reinforce his defences. At the same time, he sent messengers to Han Xin and Peng Yue again, promising them land and titles if they joined him in attacking Xiang Yu.

=== Battle of Gaixia ===
In December 203 BCE, Liu Bang, Han Xin and Peng Yue attacked Xiang Yu from three directions. Running low on supplies, Xiang Yu and his forces found themselves surrounded by Han forces in Gaixia (垓下; southeast of present-day Lingbi County, Anhui). Han Xin ordered his troops to sing Chu folk songs to create the impression that Chu territories had surrendered to Han forces, and now many Chu men had joined the Han side. The morale of Xiang Yu's forces plummeted, and many of his soldiers deserted.

Xiang Yu attempted to break out of the siege and was left with a guard escort of only 28 cavalrymen when he reached the western bank of the Yangtze River at Wujiang (烏江; near present-day He County, Anhui). Feeling too humiliated to return to his Chu homeland, Xiang Yu declined a friendly boatman's offer to ferry him across alone and decided to make a last stand at the riverside with his guards, managing to slay hundreds of pursuing Han soldiers in hand-to-hand combat before he was eventually overwhelmed and ended up committing suicide by slitting his own throat. His body was then dismembered on site by five Han officers eager to claim the bounty issued by Liu Bang.

== Aftermath ==
After Xiang Yu's death, the rest of the Chu forces surrendered to Liu Bang, and China was unified under Liu Bang's rule. Liu Bang granted Peng Yue, Ying Bu and Han Xin the titles of King of Liang, King of Huainan and King of Chu, respectively. Months later, at the urging of his followers and vassals, Liu Bang declared himself emperor and established the Han dynasty as the ruling dynasty in China. The imperial capital was at Luoyang but later moved to Chang'an (present-day Xi'an, Shaanxi), just across the Wei River from the old Qin capital Xianyang. Liu Bang made his wife Lü Zhi empress and his son Liu Ying crown prince.

Although Liu Bang initially handsomely rewarded those who helped him become emperor, he gradually became suspicious of them and started to doubt their loyalties. Han Xin was demoted from King of Chu to Marquis of Huaiyin in late 202 BCE, and was subsequently arrested and executed by Empress Lü in 196 BCE for allegedly plotting a rebellion with Chen Xi. In the same year, Liu Bang believed rumours that Peng Yue was also involved in the plot, so he demoted Peng Yue to a commoner, and Peng Yue and his family members were subsequently executed by Empress Lü. Upon hearing about what happened to Han and Peng, Ying Bu rebelled but was defeated and killed. Most other kings and lord Liu Bang appointed at the empire's founding were also subsequently deposed, killed or forced into exile, with their fiefs being given to extended members of the Liu royal family. This however would later led to the political domination of Empress Lü after Liu Bang's death and the subsequent Lü Clan disturbance, which was only quelled after the few surviving founding lords banded together to purge the Lü clan in 180 BC.

== Cultural references ==
- The entire xiangqi board and its features are often linked to the Chu-Han Contention:
  - The middle section of the board that separates the players' sides is called the "Chu river and Han border" (楚河漢界), and the red and black sides respectively represent Han and Chu.
  - At the Challenge at Guangwu Hill, Xiang Yu challenged Liu Bang to a duel to settle the war. Liu Bang refused but was subsequently shot and wounded in the chest by an arrow from Xiang Yu. This is also the anecdote for the "Flying General" rule in xiangqi. that prohibits the two Generals (called 帅; 帥; Shuài and 将; 將; Jiàng) from facing each other on the same file with no intervening pieces.
- The Beijing opera The Hegemon-King Bids His Lady Farewell, also known as Farewell My Concubine, depicts the events of Xiang Yu's defeat at the Battle of Gaixia and his romance with Consort Yu.
- Two pipa classical musical pieces depict the Battle of Gaixia from the Han and Chu perspectives respectively – "Ambush from Ten Sides" (十面埋伏) and "The Hegemon-King Takes Off His Armour" (霸王卸甲).
- Some chengyu (Chinese idioms) and proverbs originated from the events of the Chu–Han contention, such as
  - "Breaking cauldrons and sinking boats" (破釜沉舟), used to indicate one's determination to fight to the end, similar to burning one's boat and crossing the Rubicon. It originated from Xiang Yu's orders during the Battle of Julu when his outnumbered Chu forces launched a fierce, determined attack on Qin forces.
  - "Feast at Swan Goose Gate" (鴻門宴), used figuratively to refer to an ostensibly joyous occasion which is actually a dangerous trap. It originated from an incident in 206 BCE when Xiang Yu invited Liu Bang to attend a feast while secretly planning to assassinate him during the feast. The sayings "Xiang Zhuang performs a sword dance with his attention directed towards the Duke of Pei" (項莊舞劍，意在沛公), used figuratively to refer to a person's action being a veiled attack on another person; and "They are the cleaver and chopping board, and we are the fish and meat" (人為刀俎，我為魚肉), used to refer to a dangerous situation of one being at the mercy of others completely, also originated from this event.
  - "Publicly repairing the gallery roads while secretly passing through Chencang" (明修棧道，暗度陳倉), used to refer to disguising one's action with a more obvious action. It originated from Han Xin's diversion strategy to invade Guanzhong and attack the Three Qins.
  - "Fighting with one's back facing a river" (背水一戰), used to indicate one's determination to fight to the death. It originated from the Battle of Jingxing between Han Xin and the Zhao forces.
  - "Ambush on ten sides" (十面埋伏), refers to a dire situation in which one is under siege. It originated from Han Xin's strategy to trap Xiang Yu during the Battle of Gaixia.
  - "Chu songs on four sides" (四面楚歌), refers to one being in a hopelessly depressing situation. It originated from the Battle of Gaixia when Han soldiers sang Chu folk songs as part of Zhang Liang's psychological warfare to break the morale of the besieged Chu forces.

== See also ==
- Timeline of the Chu–Han Contention
