= Jingxing =

Jingxing may refer to the following of China:

== Hebei ==
- Jingxing County (井陉县), of Shijiazhuang, Hebei
- Jingxing Mining District (井陉矿区), Shijiazhuang, Hebei
- Jingxing Pass (井陉关), a mountain pass of the Taihang Mountains

== Others ==
- Chen Jingxing (陳景星), a Qing Dynasty official from Fujian, born in 1807
- Jingxing, Longjiang County (景星镇), town in Heilongjiang
