= Zhongli Mo =

- Born: Unknown; Shanyin County, Kuaiji Commandery (around present-day Shaoxing, Zhejiang)
- Died: late 202 or early 201 BC (Note: Zhongli Mo most probably died between the 10th and 12th months of the 6th year of Liu Bang's reign (including his tenure as King of Han). The duration corresponds to 19 Nov 202 BCE to 14 Feb 201 BCE in the proleptic Julian calendar.); Chen Commandery (around present-day Huaiyang, Zhoukou, Henan)
- Occupation: General

Zhongli Mo (鍾離昩 / 鍾離眜; died 201 BC), often erroneously known as Zhongli Mei (鍾離昧 / 鍾離眛), (Note: Yan Shigu described Zhongli Mo's given name as 莫葛反 in his commentary in Volume 34 of the Book of Han. This is fanqie, which means that the name is neither 眛 nor 昧, but 眜 or 昩 (the right part is not 未 but 末). It is not clear whether the radical of the character is 目 or 日 since it differs among different versions of the text, and both characters have the same pronunciation. In addition, this name appeared in Volume 7 of the Shiji.) was a Chinese military general serving under the warlord Xiang Yu during the Chu–Han Contention (206–202 BC), an interregnum between the Qin dynasty and Han dynasty.

== Early life ==
Zhongli was from Shanyin County (山陰縣), (Note: Not to be confused with the present-day Shanyin County in Shanxi.) Kuaiji Commandery, which is around present-day Shaoxing, Zhejiang. Around 208 BC, when uprisings against the Qin dynasty broke out throughout China, Zhongli joined a rebel group led by Xiang Liang which aimed to restore the Chu state of the Warring States period.

After Xiang Liang was killed in battle against Qin forces at Dingtao in late 208 BC, Zhongli continued serving under Xiang Liang's nephew and successor Xiang Yu, and became one of Xiang Yu's most trusted followers alongside Fan Zeng, Long Ju and Zhou Yin (周殷).

During this time, Zhongli developed a friendship with Han Xin, who was then serving as a lowly foot soldier in Xiang Yu's forces. He noticed Han Xin's talent and recommended him to Xiang Yu, who did not hold Han Xin in high regard. Han Xin eventually left Xiang Yu and joined Liu Bang, who recognised Han Xin's talent and made him a general.

== Chu–Han Contention ==
After the rebels overthrew the Qin dynasty in 207 BC, a power struggle, historically known as the Chu–Han Contention, broke out between two of the former rebel leaders: Xiang Yu, the Hegemon-King of Western Chu, and Liu Bang, the King of Han. Zhongli fought on Xiang Yu's side against Liu Bang.

Although Xiang Yu initially had an advantage against Liu Bang, the tide gradually turned in favour of the latter by 203 BC. In 202 BC, Zhongli was defeated by Liu Bang's forces at the Battle of Guling. Xiang Yu also fell for a ruse by Chen Ping, one of Liu Bang's advisers, and started doubting Zhongli's loyalty towards him. Seeing that his lord no longer trusted him as before, Zhongli left Xiang Yu, who ultimately lost to Liu Bang at the Battle of Gaixia and took his own life. Liu Bang, who emerged victorious in the power struggle, became the emperor and established the Han dynasty.

== Death ==
Meanwhile, Han Xin was made a vassal king by Liu Bang as a reward for helping the emperor defeat Xiang Yu during the Chu–Han Contention. Zhongli, who had become a fugitive wanted by the Han government, took shelter under his old friend Han Xin. After Liu Bang heard from his spies that Han Xin was secretly harbouring Zhongli, he ordered Han Xin to arrest Zhongli but Han Xin refused, causing the emperor to become more suspicious of him.

In c.December 202 BC, Liu Bang heard rumours that Han Xin was plotting a rebellion against him, so he heeded a suggestion by Chen Ping to pretend to go on an inspection tour in Han Xin's vassal kingdom, and then seize the opportunity to take Han Xin by surprise and capture him.

When news of Liu Bang's upcoming visit reached Han Xin, one of Han Xin's advisers suggested that they arrest Zhongli and present him to the emperor, so that the emperor would be convinced that Han Xin was loyal to him. When Han Xin discussed this matter with Zhongli, the latter warned him, "If you intend to arrest me and present me to the Han emperor to gain favour with him, I will die, but you will also follow suit." When Han Xin refused to listen to him, Zhongli scolded him for being unwise and committed suicide in frustration. In c.January 201 BCE, while Liu Bang held a meeting with his vassals at Chen, Han Xin brought Zhongli's head with him and presented it to Liu Bang.
