= Chen Yu (Eighteen Kingdoms) =

Chen Yu 陳餘 (Chinese)
- Lord of Cheng'an

King of Dai (代王)
- Tenure: 205 BC
- Predecessor: Zhao Xie
- Born: Unknown Date; Daliang, Kingdom of Wei (modern-day Kaifeng, Henan Province)
- Died: 205 BC; Kingdom of Zhao
- Spouse: Lady Gongsheng (公乘氏)

Chen Yu (simplified Chinese: 陈馀; (Note: Sometimes written as 陈余, especially in vernacular discourse.) traditional Chinese: 陳餘; pinyin: Chén Yú;

died 205 BC) was a Chinese politician and general during the late Qin Dynasty and the subsequent Chu–Han Contention.

== Early life ==
Chen Yu was from Daliang, then the capital of the Warring States kingdom of Wei. He befriended Zhang Er, also from Daliang, and "looked up to him as a father." After Qin conquered Wei in 225 BC, the Qin government put a bounty on Zhang Er and Chen Yu in order to eliminate possible sources of resistance to Qin rule; they fled to Chen County (now Huaiyang County, Zhoukou, Henan Province) under new identities and made a living there as gatekeepers.

One day, when Chen Yu and Zhang Er were standing guard, a village official accused Chen Yu of a crime and began to beat him. When Chen Yu tried to resist, Zhang Er stepped on his foot to stop him. After the official left, Zhang Er took Chen Yu aside and admonished him,

What about all the big things you and I have planned? Just because you have suffered some petty insult, are you going to throw away your life now on one little official?

They hid their identities to the point that they announced the orders of their own arrest to the villagers.

== Rebellion against Qin ==
When the Dazexiang uprising reached Chen County in 209 BC, Chen Yu and Zhang Er joined the forces of Chen Sheng, who was delighted with their appearance, having heard of them often. Chen Yu was made Colonel of the Right (右校尉) and assigned to Wu Chen's forces along with Zhang Er in a campaign to conquer the former territories of Kingdom of Zhao. As Wu Chen's forces reached Handan, the former capital of Zhao, Chen Yu and Zhang Er, hearing that Chen Sheng had executed many of his generals based on hearsay and disgruntled that they themselves were only made colonels instead of generals, managed to convince Wu Chen to break from Chen Sheng and make himself King of Zhao. Chen Yu was then made Commander-in-Chief (大將軍).

Wu Chen was later killed by his subordinate Li Liang (李良), who then surrendered to the Qin army. Chen Yu and Zhang Er were targeted, but, after being informed by their agents, they managed to flee Handan. Zhang Er, upon the advice of a retainer, made Zhao Xie (趙歇), a member of the royal family of the old Kingdom of Zhao, the king of the new Zhao Kingdom. As a Qin force under Zhang Han took Handan and razed its walls, Zhang Er and Zhao Xie fled to Julu (鉅鹿), which was besieged by another Qin force, led by Wang Li (王离), soon after. Meanwhile, Chen Yu parted ways with them, gathered some troops, and garrisoned to the north of Julu.

Zhang Er sought help from Chen Yu, but he, estimating that his forces were not nearly enough to stop the Qin forces, dared not to advance. After months of repeated urging, Zhang Er sent his men Zhang Yan (張黶) and Chen Ze (陳澤) to Chen Yu's camp for help. They managed to convince Chen Yu to grant them a token force to relieve the siege, but they and their force were all killed in battle.

When the siege was finally lifted by Chu forces led by Xiang Yu, Zhang Er confronted Chen Yu. When asked about Zhang Yan and Chen Ze, Chen Yu told Zhang Er what had happened, but Zhang Er did not believe his account, instead believing that Chen Yu had murdered them. In a fit of anger, Chen Yu left his seal for Zhang Er to take as he left to relieve himself. It was at this point that a retainer convinced Zhang Er to take the seal, claiming that it was granted to him by Heaven and that failing to take it would have negative consequences. Zhang Er took the seal and, by extension, Chen Yu's forces. Thus, they fell out with one another.

== During the Chu-Han Contention ==
Upon the fall of Qin in 206 BC, Xiang Yu, now the "Hegemon-King of Western Chu" (西楚霸王), established eighteen states over the former Qin territories. In particular, the Kingdom of Zhao was split into the kingdoms of Dai (代) and Changshan (常山), which were given to Zhao Xie and Zhang Er, respectively, while Chen Yu was given just three counties and the title of marquis. Believing that his merit was equal to that of Zhang Er and that he deserved a greater domain, Chen Yu convinced Tian Rong, the self-proclaimed King of Qi who had raised his own force and conquered the kingdoms of Jiaodong, Jibei, and Lingzi (Note: These three states were collectively known as the "Three Qis" because they occupied the area of the Warring State Kingdom of Qi.) for the same reason, to provide him with a force to attack Changshan. In 205 BC, Chen Yu, successful in defeating Zhang Er, restored the Kingdom of Zhao and welcomed Zhao Xie back. Zhao Xie gave the title of King of Dai to Chen Yu, who, instead of moving to his domain in Dai County (now Yu County, Hebei Province), stayed by Zhao Xie's side as a minister. It was at this point in time that Chen Yu styled himself the Lord of Cheng'an (成安君). Meanwhile, Zhang Er fled to Hàn and entered the services of Liu Bang.

Later in the same year, Liu Bang attacked Chu and asked Chen Yu to do the same. Chen Yu demanded the death of Zhang Er in exchange, but was fooled by Liu Bang, who killed a man in Zhang Er's likeliness and sent his head to Chen Yu. Chen Yu detected the ruse after Liu Bang's defeat at Pengcheng and subsequently broke off the alliance.

Subsequently, A Hàn force led by Han Xin and Zhang Er, having already defeated Wei Bao, attacked Zhao. As the Hàn army reached Jingxing (井陘), a strategic chokepoint, it was met by the Zhao army under the combined command of Zhao Xie and Chen Yu. Li Zuoche, (Note: Grandson of Warring States general Li Mu.) Lord of Guangwu (廣武君) and one of Chen Yu's advisors, advised Chen Yu to take a defensive position and give him a small force to cut off the Hàn supply lines. Chen Yu, reasoning that his force was far greater than that of Hàn and that failing to destroy it would attract attacks by other kingdoms, did not heed Li Zuoche's advice. The Zhao army was then defeated on the battlefield, and Chen Yu was killed. Li Zuoche and Zhao Xie were captured. While Li Zuoche was spared and joined the services of Han Xin, Zhao Xie was executed.

== Legacy ==
Kuai Che, Han Xin's advisor, commented on the relationship between Chen Yu and Zhang Er:

When [Zhang Er], the king of [Changshan], and [Chen Yu], the lord of [Cheng'an], were still commoners, they swore to be friends until death, and yet after they had quarreled over the affair of [Zhang Yan] and [Chen Shi], they grew to hate each other...These two had been the fastest friends in the world. Why then did one end as the prisoner of the other? Because evil arises from excess of desires, and the heart of man is hard to fathom!
