= Zhang Er (Eighteen Kingdoms) =

3rd-century BC Chinese politician

Zhang Er 張耳 (Chinese)

King of Changshan (常山王)
- Tenure: 207–205 BC

King of Zhao (趙王)
- Tenure: 203–September 202 BC
- Successor: Zhang Ao
- Born: Unknown Date; Daliang, Kingdom of Wei (modern-day Kaifeng, Henan Province)
- Died: c. September 202 BC; Han China
- Issue: Zhang Ao
Posthumous name
- Jing (景)

Zhang Er (simplified Chinese: 张耳; traditional Chinese: 張耳; pinyin: Zhāng Ěr; died c. September 202 BC (Note: According to vol. 11 of Zizhi Tongjian, Zhang Er died in the 7th month of the 5th year of Liu Bang's reign (including his tenure as King of Han).)) was a Chinese politician during the late Qin Dynasty and the subsequent Chu–Han Contention.

He had served multiple different leaders before being made King of Changshan (常山王) during Xiang Yu's division of the former Qin empire. His kingdom was destroyed soon after, and he entered the services of Liu Bang, who, upon conquering the territories of his former kingdom, made him a vassal king ruling over them under a new title: King of Zhao (趙王).

== Early life ==
Zhang Er was from Daliang, then the capital of the Warring States Kingdom of Wei. During his youth, he was one of Lord Xinling's retainers. To escape capture for an unknown crime, he fled to Waihuang County (now Minquan County, Henan Province).

In Waihuang County, there was a beautiful married woman from a rich family, who, disdaining her husband's lack of ability, sought help from one of her father's retainers. This retainer, a friend of Zhang Er's, recommended him as a match for her. Zhang Er agreed to the marriage, and the woman married him after divorcing her original husband. Seeing the usefulness of retainers, Zhang Er began to recruit retainers of his own and befriended figures such as Liu Bang and Chen Yu. He also became the magistrate of Waihuang County. After Qin conquered Wei in 225 BC, the Qin government put a bounty on Zhang Er and Chen Yu in order to eliminate possible sources of resistance to Qin rule; they fled to Chen County (now Huaiyang County, Zhoukou, Henan Province) under new identities and made a living there as gatekeepers.

== Rebellion against Qin ==
When the Dazexiang uprising reached Chen County in 209 BC, Zhang Er and Chen Yu joined Chen Sheng's forces. They were made Colonel of the Left (左校尉) and Colonel of the Right (右校尉), respectively, and assigned to Wu Chen's forces in a campaign to conquer the former territories of Kingdom of Zhao. As Wu Chen's forces reached Handan, the former capital of Zhao, Zhang Er and Chen Yu, hearing that Chen Sheng had executed many of his generals based on hearsay and disgruntled that they themselves were only made colonels instead of generals, managed to convince Wu Chen to break from Chen Sheng and make himself King of Zhao. Zhang Er was then made Chancellor. (Note: According to his own biography in the Shiji: Chancellor of the Right (右丞相). According to that of Chen Sheng and Wu Guang: Chancellor of the Left (左丞相).)

Wu Chen was later killed by his subordinate Li Liang (李良). Zhang Er, upon the advice of a retainer, made Zhao Xie (趙歇), a member of the royal family of the old Kingdom of Zhao, the king of the new Zhao Kingdom. As a Qin force under Zhang Han took Handan and razed its walls, Zhang Er and Zhao Xie fled to Julu (鉅鹿), which was besieged by another Qin force, led by Wang Li (王离), soon after. Zhang Er sought help from Chen Yu, whose force was garrisoned to the north of Julu, but he, estimating that his forces were not nearly enough to stop the Qin forces, dared not to advance. After months of repeated urging, Zhang Er sent his men Zhang Yan (張黶) and Chen Ze (陳澤) to Chen Yu's camp for help. They managed to convince Chen Yu to grant them a token force to relieve the siege, but they and their force were all killed in battle.

When the siege was finally lifted by Chu forces led by Xiang Yu, Zhang Er confronted Chen Yu. When asked about Zhang Yan and Chen Ze, Chen Yu told Zhang Er what had happened, but Zhang Er did not believe his account, instead believing that Chen Yu had murdered them. In a fit of anger, Chen Yu left his seal for Zhang Er to take as he left to relieve himself. It was at this point that a retainer convinced Zhang Er to take the seal, claiming that it was granted to him by Heaven and that failing to take it would have negative consequences. Zhang Er took the seal and, by extension, Chen Yu's forces. Thus, they fell out with one another. Zhang Er then accompanied Xiang Yu in his invasion of Guanzhong.

== During the Chu-Han Contention ==
Upon the fall of Qin in 206 BC, Xiang Yu, now the "Hegemon-King of Western Chu" (西楚霸王), established eighteen states over the former Qin territories. In particular, the Kingdom of Zhao was split into two: the Kingdom of Dai (代), which was given to Zhao Xie, the erstwhile King of Zhao, and the Kingdom of Changshan (常山), which was given to Zhang Er, whose merits had reached the ears of Xiang Yu through the many friends that he had made. Chen Yu was only given three counties and the title of marquis.

In 205 BCE, Chen Yu, believing that his merit was equal to that of Zhang Er and that he deserved a greater domain, convinced Tian Rong, the self-proclaimed King of Qi who had raised his own force and conquered the kingdoms of Jiaodong, Jibei, and Lingzi (Note: These three states were collectively known as the "Three Qis" because they occupied the area of the Warring State Kingdom of Qi.) for the same reason, to provide him with a force to attack Changshan. Chen Yu, successful in doing so, restored the Kingdom of Zhao. Zhao Xie gave the title of King of Dai to Chen Yu, who, instead of moving to his domain in Dai County (now Yu County, Hebei Province), stayed by Zhao Xie's side as a minister. Zhang Er, now in exile, considered fleeing to Chu, but, upon the advice of an advisor, went to Hàn instead. There, he was well-received by Liu Bang, the King of Hàn.

In the same year, Liu Bang attacked Chu and asked Chen Yu to do the same. Chen Yu demanded the death of Zhang Er in exchange, but was fooled by Liu Bang, who killed a man in Zhang Er's likeliness and sent his head to Chen Yu. Chen Yu detected the ruse after Liu Bang's defeat at Pengcheng and subsequently broke off the alliance. Soon thereafter, he and Zhao Xie were both defeated and killed by Hàn forces led by Han Xin and Zhang Er, their territories annexed by Hàn.

In 203 BC, Zhang Er was made King of Zhao as a vassal of Hàn upon Han Xin's recommendation. He died in the next year, and his title was inherited by his son Zhang Ao. Zhang Er received the posthumous name of 景 (jǐng), meaning "respected" or "orderly."

The rulers of Former Liang claimed descent from him.
