= Battle of Gaixia =

Battle that established the Han dynasty

- Part of the Chu-Han contention
Date	December 203 BC
Location	Gaixia (in present-day Guzhen County, Anhui) 33°19′40″N 117°33′04″E
Result	Han victory: Han gains control of China; Liu Bang assumes the title of emperor of the newly formed Han dynasty

Belligerents
Kingdom of Han	Kingdom of Western Chu

Commanders and leaders
Han Xin; Liu Bang	Xiang Yu ‡‡

Strength
300,000	100,000

Casualties and losses
Unknown	100,000: 80,000 killed in action; 20,000 captured
- Location within China

Battle of Gaixia
- Traditional Chinese: 垓下之戰
- Simplified Chinese: 垓下之战
Transcriptions
Standard Mandarin
- Hanyu Pinyin: Gāixià Zhī Zhàn

The Battle of Gaixia, also known as The Last Stand at Wu River, was a battle of annihilation during Early Imperial China, fought between the forces of Han under Liu Bang and Western Chu under Xiang Yu in December 203 BC. It was the final major battle of the Chu-Han Contention, a civil war period following the collapse of the Qin dynasty, which finally ended when Xiang Yu committed suicide after making a last stand by the west bank of Yangtze River at Wujiang. The victorious Liu Bang would ascend to the throne a few months after the battle, declaring himself Emperor of the newly established Han dynasty.

== Background ==
In November 204 BC the Han General-in-Chief Han Xin defeated the Chu-Qi coalition in the Battle of Wei River, and in early 203 he completed the Han conquest of the State of Qi, an ally of Western Chu. For these reasons, the situation of Xiang Yu, the Hegemon-King of Western Chu, had become increasingly precarious. Since 205 he and Liu Bang, the King of Han, had worn each other down in a war of attrition in the Central Plain, and Xiang had effectively run out of options to wrest control of northern China from Han Xin. Therefore, Xiang Yu sent an envoy to Han Xin with the proposal that he remain neutral and that China be divided between Liu Bang, Xiang Yu and Han Xin. Han Xin's advisor Kuai Tong encouraged him to accept this proposal, accurately predicting that Liu Bang would eventually execute Han Xin as being too dangerous. However, Han Xin was grateful for the opportunities to command that he had received from Liu Bang, and he recalled that, when he had earlier served Xiang Yu as a guardsman, Xiang Yu had refused to listen to his suggestions. As a result, he chose to remain loyal to Liu Bang.

Meanwhile, Liu Bang and Xiang Yu were camped on Western Guangwu Hill and Eastern Guangwu Hill, respectively, to the north of the Chu-controlled city of Xingyang. Increasingly frustrated, Xiang Yu threatened to kill Liu Bang's captured father and wife and have them cooked over a fire, to force Liu Bang to surrender. Liu Bang simply replied that since the two had sworn to regard each other as 'brothers' (during the earlier years of the revolt against the Qin dynasty) he would be effectively cooking his own father, and joked that Xiang Yu should not forget to send him a cup of 'their' father's flesh to share as good brothers. After unsuccessfully seeking to persuade Liu Bang to agree to a duel, Xiang Yu also attempted to assassinate Liu Bang by having hidden archers fire at him during a verbal exchange. However, the latter survived his wound, apparently after making the wound seem less severe to his soldiers to avoid inducing panic.

In August 203 Liu Bang sent an envoy to conduct peace talks with Xiang Yu. Xiang Yu's army was running short of food. The pro-Han warlord Peng Yue had been attacking Xiang Yu's supply lines since 205; the loss of Qi had further impacted supplies; and Han Xin, now the King of Qi, had begun making attacks on the Chu heartland from the north. For these reasons, Xiang Yu agreed to negotiate. Liu Bang's father and wife were returned to him, and they agreed that they should divide China along the ancient Honggou Canal, which had carried water from the Yellow River from the north of Xingyang and ran between Western Guangwu Hill and Eastern Guangwu Hill.

In September Xiang Yu began to withdraw to the east, but the peace proposal of Liu Bang had been a ploy devised by the Han advisors Zhang Liang and Chen Ping to have Xiang Yu return Liu's father and wife and cede control of Xingyang, and then catch Xiang unprepared. In October Liu Bang broke the peace, pursuing Xiang Yu as far as Yanxia, and he sent envoys to Han Xin and Peng Yue, ordering them to join him in Guling to destroy Xiang Yu's army. However, after Liu Bang advanced to Guling, Han Xin and Peng Yue did not arrive. Xiang Yu then attacked and inflicted a severe defeat on Liu's army, forcing Liu's soldiers to remain behind the barricades of their camp.

On the advice of Zhang Liang and Chen Ping, Liu Bang promised to make Han Xin King of Chu and Peng Yue King of Liang. With this incentive, Han Xin and Peng Yue more eagerly dedicated themselves to the invasion of Chu, with Han Xin, as General-in-Chief, taking the lead in devising a strategy.

== Battle ==
With the conquest of the State of Qi by Han Xin, the Han and their allies were now in full control of northern China, and Han Xin could now march against Xiang Yu while possessing several advantages. As the King of Qi, with allies in Zhao and Yan, he now had a larger army than Liu Bang himself, whose army, along with that of Xiang Yu, had been worn down through mutual campaigns of attrition in the Central Plain. Using his own army, that of Liu Bang, the force of Peng Yue, and the Han and allied forces located in Jiujiang to the south, in late 203 Han Xin launched a multi-pronged invasion of Chu. Han attacked from the further north-east, Peng the nearer north-east, Liu the west, Ying Bu the nearer south-east and Zhou Yin and Liu Jia the further south-east. Under Han Xin's overall command, in December the armies were able to coordinate and rendezvous on Chu territory, a logistically impressive feat considering it was winter. The details are unclear, but if Xiang Yu had intended to defeat any of these armies in detail before they could unite, he failed to do so.

The coalition army defeated Xiang Yu in a battle outside the former Chu capital of Chen, before meeting for battle again at Gaixia. Because of Han Xin's conquest of northern China, the Han coalition outnumbered the army of Xiang Yu. However, not content to rely on numbers, in the battle at Gaixia Han Xin's tactics somewhat resembled those of Hannibal Barca at the Battle of Cannae. Having formed two reserve lines in case of failure, his centre advanced against the enemy centre. Failing to gain an advantage against Xiang Yu's veterans, Han Xin then withdrew his centre, which was likely then pursued by Xiang Yu's men. However, the left and right flanks of the Han army, commanded by General Gung and General Pi respectively, then attacked Xiang Yu's army from both sides, probably performing a double envelopment. Han Xin returned his centre to the offensive once the enemy had been pinned in place and was beginning to falter, and he inflicted a major defeat on the Chu army.

Having been defeated, Xiang Yu retreated with the survivors to his camp, where they were surrounded, and that night the Han infantry, many of whom were Chu in origin, sang traditional songs of Chu. This induced homesickness and desertions in Xiang Yu's army and made Xiang believe that many Chu soldiers had already defected to the Han armies before the battle at Gaixia. Hemorrhaging soldiers through defections and believing his position hopeless, Xiang fled later that night with only 800 cavalry. Pursued by Han cavalry under Guan Ying and having lost most of his remaining followers during the pursuit, when he reached the Wu River he was ashamed of how many of his native Wu soldiers had died under him, and he chose to fight a last stand by the river against the Han cavalry rather than return to his Wu homeland. He reportedly killed hundreds of his Han pursuers and suffered a dozen wounds before he committed suicide by cutting his own throat. The Han cavalrymen, who had been promised rewards for the killing of Xiang Yu, tore apart his body in the fight to claim responsibility for his death. When five soldiers fitted together Xiang Yu's head and limbs to identify him, the reward - 1000 catties of gold and a fief of 10,000 households - was divided among the five of them.

== Aftermath ==
By 202 BC, most resistance had been crushed. Han Xin captured the cities of Lu and Huling (Lu eventually surrendered on being shown the head of Xiang Yu), and Liu Bang sent Jin Xi to conquer the pro-Xiang Yu kingdom of Linjiang and capture its king Gong Wei, who was executed by Liu. In February, Liu Bang ascended the throne as Gaozu, the first emperor of the Han dynasty. Had Xiang Yu successfully retreated into Wu, he might have been able to stall the Han advance.

== Debates ==
- It is possible that the popular game xiangqi (Chinese Chess) was invented by Xiang Yu at the time of the peace treaty. One account stated that Xiang Yu invented xiangqi so that all future battles between Chu and Han can be fought over this game, hence no further human life losses needed to be sustained by either side. In another version of the story, Liu Bang invented xiangqi, not Xiang Yu. In a third version popularized by a recent book from David H. Li, it was Han Xin that invented the game. One common factor cited in these folklores is that in the game of xiangqi, the line which divides the board into 2 parts is marked "Chu River" on the black side and "Han Border" on the red side. There is, however, no historical documentation suggesting an actual origin in this era; the first written description of xiangqi's rules appeared much later, in the Tang dynasty.
- According to some historians, the battle took place in either Lingbi County or in what is now Luyi County.

== See also ==
- Timeline of the Chu–Han Contention
