= Ji Xin =

Chinese military officer who lived in the third century BC

- 紀信
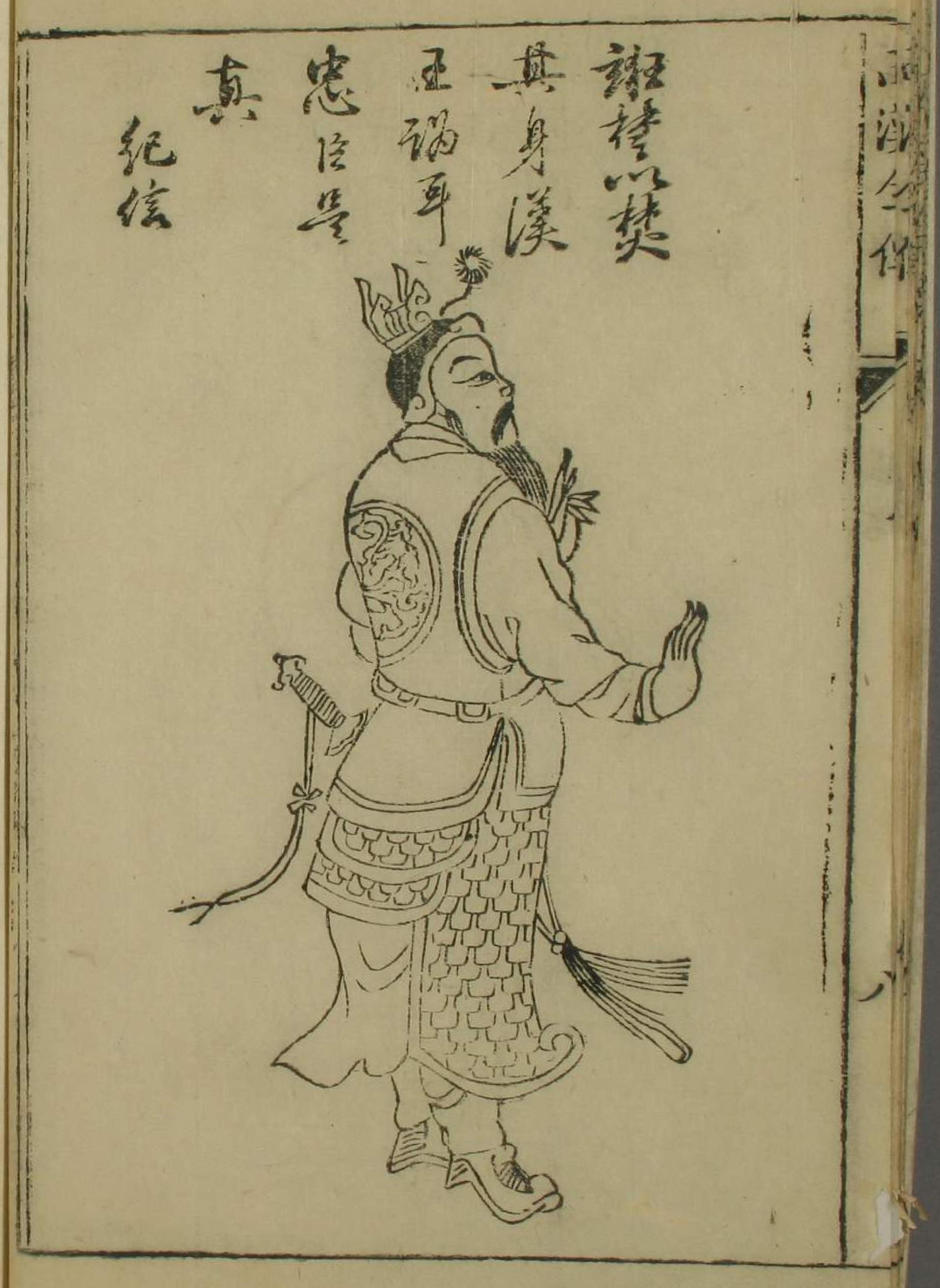

Personal details
- Born: Unknown
- Died: June or July 204 BC Xingyang, Henan
- Children: Ji Tong
- Occupation: Military officer
- Posthumous name: Zhonglie (忠烈)
- Peerage: Marquis of Xingyang (滎陽侯)

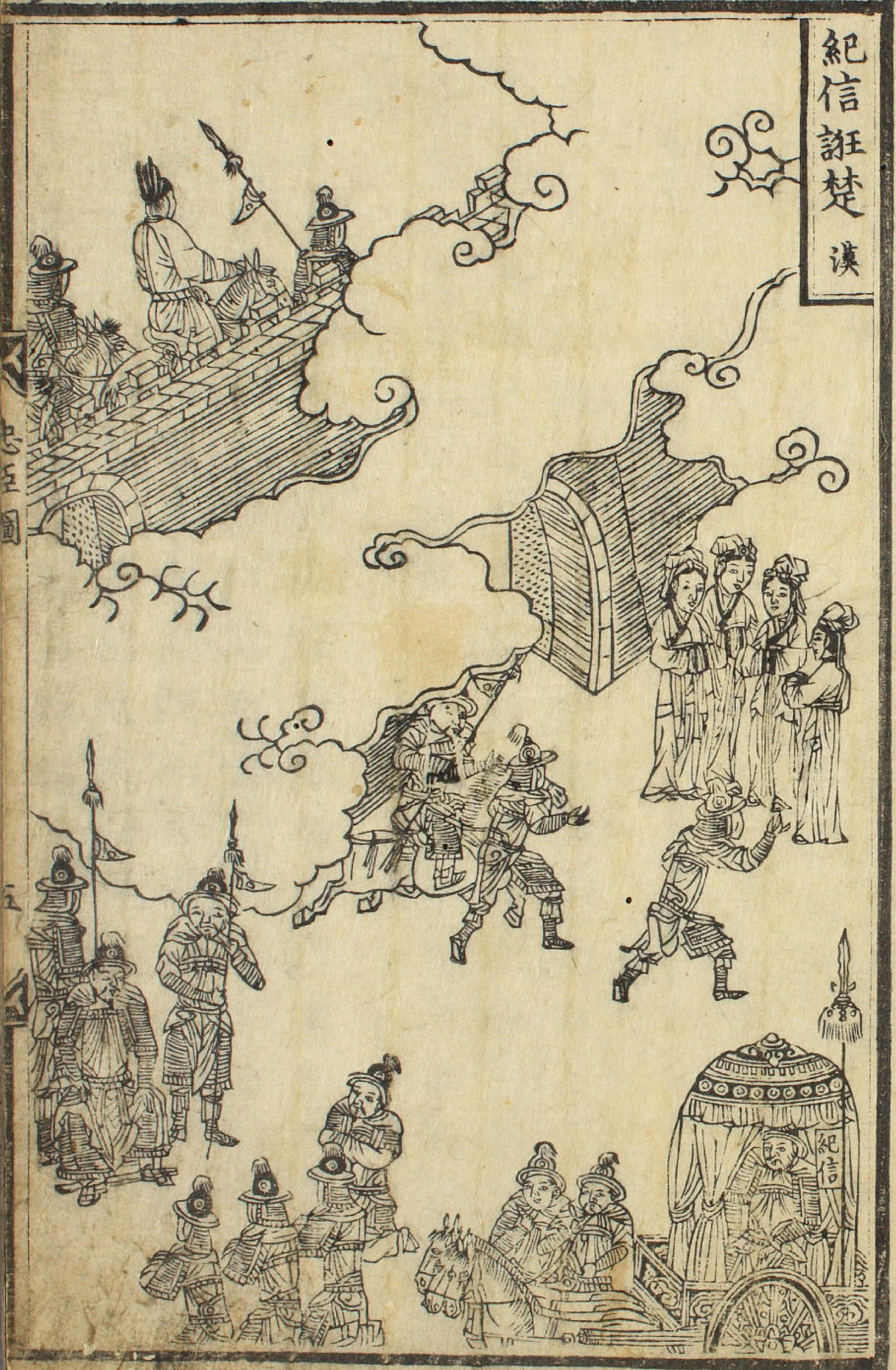
A depiction of Ji Xin disguising himself to trick Xiang Yu

Ji Xin (紀信; died June or July 204 BC), posthumously known as Marquis Zhonglie of Xingyang (滎陽忠烈侯), was a military officer serving under Liu Bang (Emperor Gaozu), the founding emperor of the Han dynasty. He is best known for his role at the Battle of Xingyang in 204 BC between Liu Bang and his rival Xiang Yu, when he disguised himself as Liu Bang and pretended to surrender to Xiang Yu in order to buy time for Liu Bang to escape. After Ji Xin was caught, Xiang Yu, seeing how loyal Ji Xin was towards his lord, offered him a chance to join his forces. However, Ji Xin refused, so Xiang Yu had him burnt to death.

To honour him for his loyalty and sacrifice, the people of Xingyang (now part of Zhengzhou, Henan) built a temple dedicated to him and enshrined him as their City God. In 1372, the Hongwu Emperor of the Ming dynasty bestowed honorary titles of nobility on Ji Xin and his family. In 1438, the Zhengtong Emperor ordered the temple in Xingyang to be rebuilt and honoured Ji Xin with the title "Marquis of Xingyang" and the posthumous name "Zhonglie" ("loyal and valiant").
