= Jingxing Pass =

- Location within China
- Traversed by: G307

Third Approach
- Location: Shijiazhuang, Hebei, China
- Range: Taihang Mountains
- Coordinates: 38.07°N 114.28°E

Jingxing Pass
- Traditional Chinese: 井陘關
- Simplified Chinese: 井陉关
Transcriptions
Standard Mandarin
- Hanyu Pinyin: Jǐngxíng Guān

Jingxing Pass (Chinese: 井陉关; pinyin: Jǐngxíng Guān) is one of the major mountain passes on the Taihang Mountains, site of the famous Battle of Tao River or Battle of Jingxing where the famous general Han Xin (韓信) a victory against superior forces in the pass.

The historical site from Han dynasty is in modern day Tumenguan Township referencing later named Tumen Pass (Chinese: 土门关). It is located near the tourist attraction Baodu Zhai. The Jingxing County, bearing the same name, is in the valley to the west of the passage.
