= Wu Chen (general) =

Chinese military general (died 208 BC)

Wu Chen (Chinese: 武臣; pinyin: Wǔ Chén; died 208 BC) was a Chinese military general and rebel leader who served Chen Sheng (陳勝) during the Qin dynasty.

Wu Chen later proclaimed himself King of Zhao but was killed by his subordinate Li Liang, for Li accidentally performed kowtow to Wu's elder sister. Li felt humiliated by performing this action toward a woman, so he killed Wu as a revenge.

After Wu Chen's death, Zhao rebels made Zhao Xie, a member of the Zhao royal family, inherit the throne.
