= Xiang Yu =

Warlord of Western Chu of China (c. 232–202 BC)

Xiang Yu 項羽
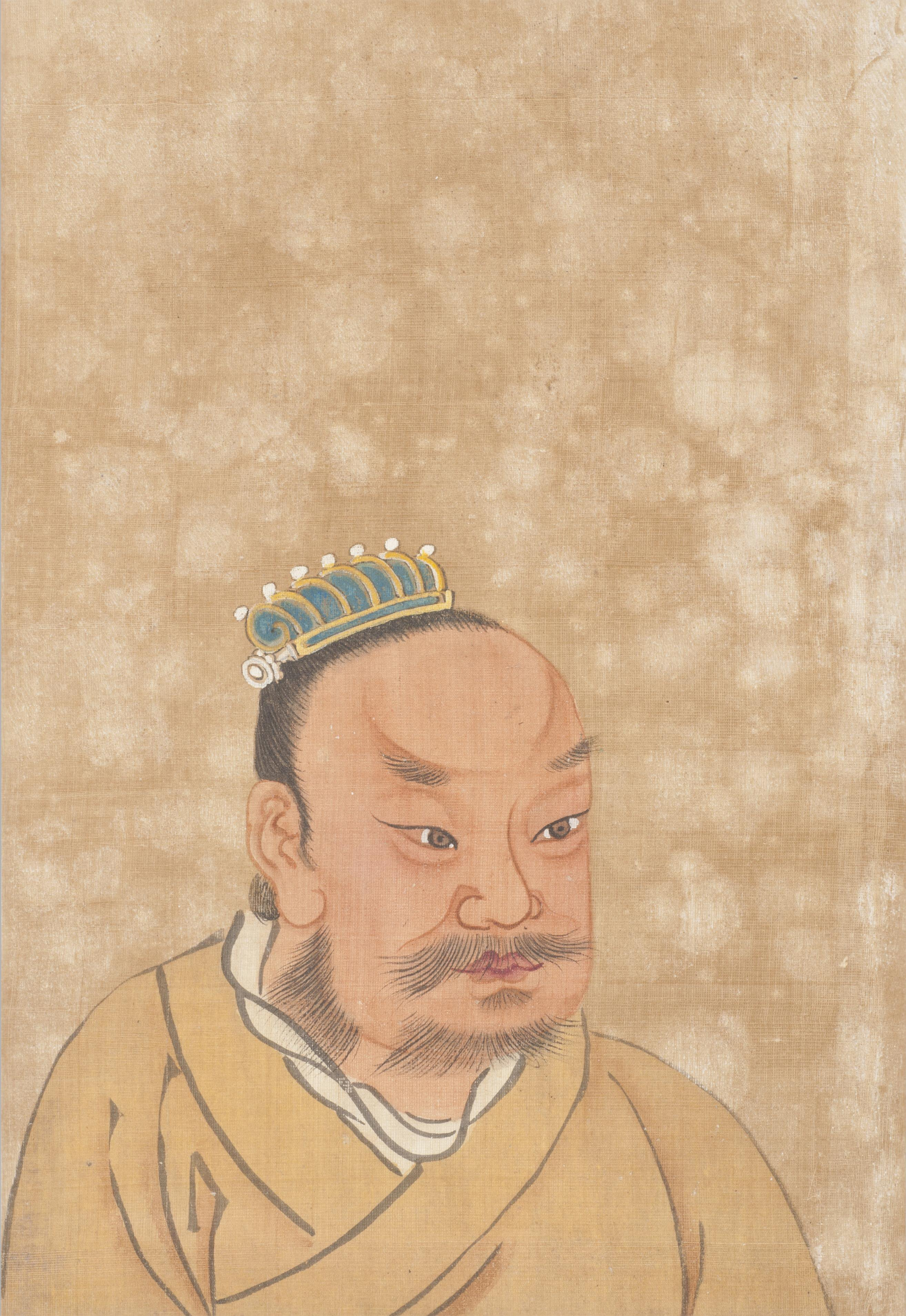
- As depicted in the album Portraits of Famous Men, c. 1900, housed in the Philadelphia Museum of Art

Ruler of Chu
- Reign: 206–202 BC
- Predecessor: Emperor Yi of Chu
- Born: 232 BC; Xiaxiang (下相) (modern Suqian, Jiangsu)
- Died: 202 BC (aged 29–30); He County, Anhui
- Wife: Consort Yu
Names
- Clan name: Xiang (項); Family name: Ji (姬); Personal name: Ji (籍); Courtesy name: Yu (羽)
- Father: Xiang Chao
- Mother: Princess Mi ji of chu

Xiang Yu
- Traditional Chinese: 項羽
- Simplified Chinese: 项羽
Transcriptions
Standard Mandarin
- Hanyu Pinyin: Xiàng Yǔ
- Wade–Giles: Hsiang^{4} Yü^{3}
- IPA: [ɕjâŋ ỳ]
Yue: Cantonese
- Yale Romanization: Hohng Yúh
- Jyutping: Hong6 Jyu5
- IPA: [hɔŋ˨ jy˩˧]
Southern Min
- Hokkien POJ: Hāng Ú

Hegemon-King of Western Chu
- Chinese: 西楚霸王
Transcriptions
Standard Mandarin
- Hanyu Pinyin: Xīchǔ bà wáng
- Wade–Giles: Hsi^{1}-ch'u^{3} pa^{4} wang^{2}
- IPA: [ɕí ʈʂʰù pâ wǎŋ]
Yue: Cantonese
- Jyutping: Sai1-co2 baa3 wong4

Xiang Yu (c. 232 – c. January 202 BC), born Xiang Ji, was a Chinese warlord who founded and led the short-lived kingdom-state of Western Chu during the interregnum period between the Qin and Han dynasties known as the Chu–Han Contention (206–202 BC).

A nobleman of the former state of Chu, Xiang Yu rebelled against the Qin dynasty under the command of his uncle, Xiang Liang, and was granted the title of "Duke of Lu" (魯公) by King Huai II of the restored Chu state in 208 BC. The following year, he led an outnumbered Chu army to victory at the Battle of Julu against the Qin armies led by Zhang Han. After the fall of Qin, Xiang Yu divided the country into a federacy of Eighteen Kingdoms, among which he was self-titled as the "Hegemon-King of Western Chu" (西楚霸王) and ruled a vast region spanning central and eastern China, with Pengcheng as his capital.

Although a formidable warrior and tactician, Xiang Yu was poor in both diplomacy and strategy, especially after dismissing his own adviser Fan Zeng. He was later outcompeted by his main rival, Liu Bang during the massive civil war among the rebel kingdoms, which concluded with his eventual defeat and suicide in a last stand at the Battle of Gaixia. The demise of Xiang Yu allowed Liu Bang to subsequently become the founding emperor of the newly established Han dynasty, which is widely regarded as a golden age in Chinese history.

== Names and titles ==
Xiang Yu's clan name was Xiang (項) and his family name was Ji (姬), while his given name was Ji (籍), and his courtesy name was Yu (羽). He is best known as Xiang Yu (項羽). Xiang Yu is referred to as the "Hegemon-King of Western Chu" (西楚霸王) or simply "Hegemon-King" (霸王; also translated as "Conqueror-King").

== Family background ==
There are two accounts of Xiang Yu's family background. The first claimed that Xiang Yu was from the House of Mi (羋), the royal family of the Chu state. His ancestors were granted Xiang County (項縣; around present-day Shenqiu County, Henan) as their fief by the king of Chu and had since adopted Xiang as their family name. The other account claimed that Xiang Yu was a descendant of a noble clan from the Lu state and his family had served in the Chu army for generations. Xiang Yu's grandfather, Xiang Yan, was a general who was killed in action while leading Chu forces to resist an invasion by the Qin state in 223 BC.

Xiang Yu was born in 232 BC during the late Warring States period when the Qin state started conquering the other six major states. According to the descendants of the Xiang family living in Suqian, Jiangsu, Xiang Yu's father was Xiang Chao (項超), Xiang Yan's eldest son. Xiang Yu was raised by his uncle, Xiang Liang, because his father died early. In 221 BC, when Xiang Yu was about 11 years old, the Qin state unified China and established the Qin dynasty.

Xiang Yu had a double pupil in one eye just like the mythical Emperor Shun and Duke Wen of Jin. He was thus seen as an extraordinary person because his unique double pupil was a mark of a king or sage in Chinese tradition. Xiang Yu was slightly taller than eight chi, or approximately 1.86 m (6 ft 1 in), and possessed great physical strength as he could lift a ding.

== Early life ==
In his younger days, Xiang Yu was instructed in scholarly arts and swordsmanship, but he did not manage to master what he was taught, and his uncle, Xiang Liang was not very satisfied with him. Xiang Yu said, "Books are only useful in helping me remember my name. Mastering swordsmanship allows me to face only one opponent, so it's not worth learning. I want to learn how to defeat thousands of enemies." After hearing that, his uncle tried to teach him military strategy, but he stopped learning after he had grasped the main concepts. Xiang Liang was disappointed with his nephew, who showed no sign of motivation or apparent talent apart from his great strength, so he gave up and let Xiang Yu decide his own future.

When Xiang Yu grew older, Xiang Liang killed someone so they fled to the Wu region to evade the authorities. Around the time, Qin Shi Huang was on an inspection tour in that area. As Xiang Yu and his uncle watched the emperor's procession pass by, Xiang Yu said, "I can replace him." Shocked by what his nephew said, Xiang Liang immediately covered Xiang Yu's mouth with his hand. After this incident, Xiang Liang began to see his nephew in a different light.

== Revolt against the Qin dynasty ==
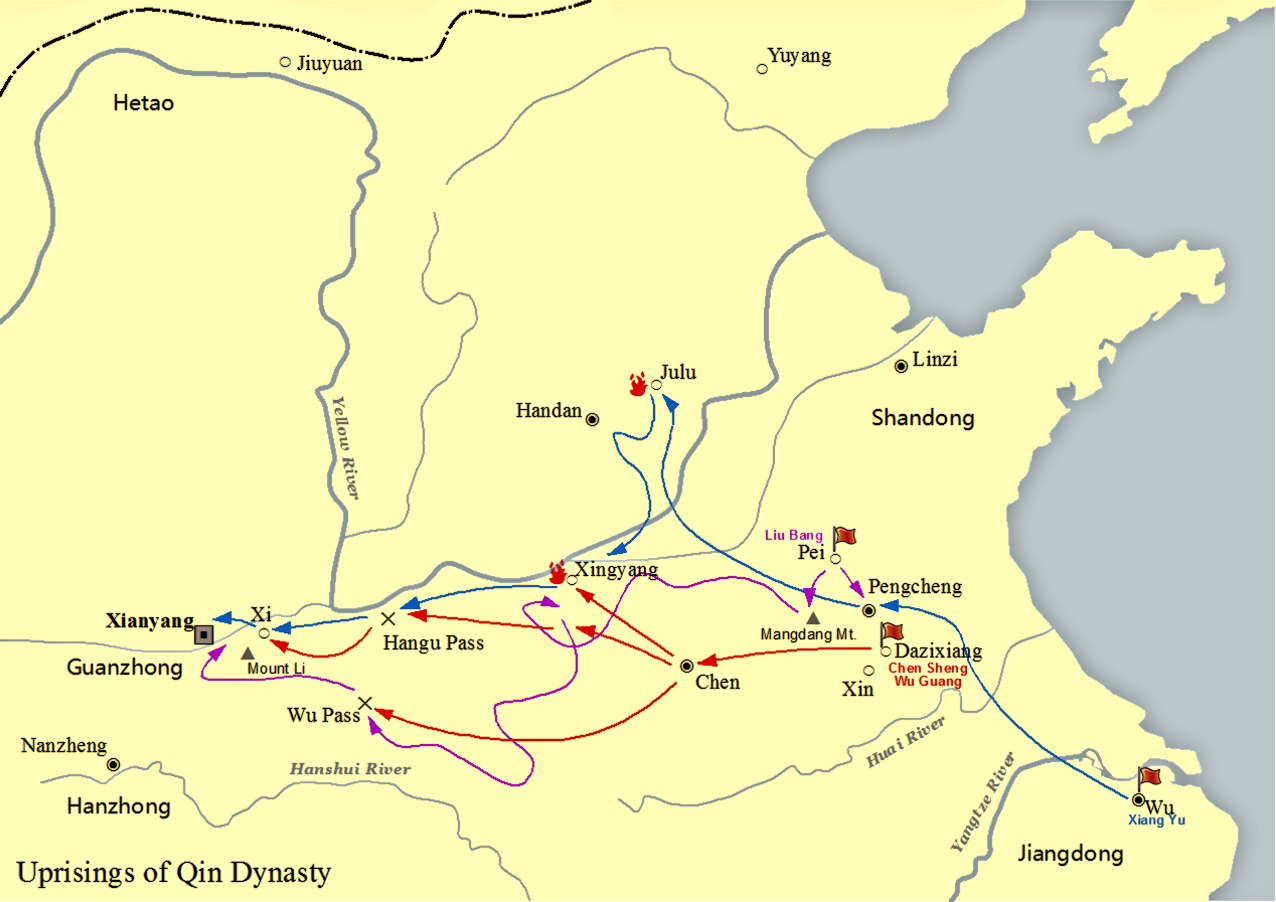
A map showing the uprisings against the Qin dynasty. Xiang Yu's campaign is shown in blue.

In 209 BC, several uprisings erupted throughout China to overthrow the Qin dynasty. Some of these rebel groups claimed to be restoring the former six states which were conquered by the Qin state. Yin Tong, the Qin-appointed administrator of Kuaiji Commandery, wanted to rebel against the Qin government as well, so he invited the Xiangs to meet him and discuss. Xiang Yu and Xiang Liang lured Yin Tong into a trap and killed him; Xiang Yu killed hundreds of Yin Tong's men during the battle. After that, Xiang Liang started his own rebellion and rallied about 8,000 men to support him, declaring himself the new Administrator of Kuaiji and appointing Xiang Yu as a general. Xiang Liang's rebel group grew in size until it was between 60,000 and 70,000 men. In 208 BC, Xiang Liang installed Mi Xin as King Huai II of Chu to rally support from those eager to help him overthrow the Qin dynasty and restore the former Chu state. At this time, King Huai II was merely a puppet ruler, as the Xiangs still controlled the Chu rebel group's armed forces. During this time, Xiang Yu gained a reputation for being a competent general and formidable warrior from participating in battles against Qin forces.

Later that year, after Xiang Liang was killed at Dingtao against Qin forces, control over the Chu rebel group's armed forces fell into the hands of King Huai II and his close aides. In the winter of 208 BC, the Zhao rebel group led by Zhao Xie requested for assistance from the Chu rebel group while they were under attack by Qin forces in Handan. King Huai II gave Xiang Yu the title "Duke of Lu" (魯公) and appointed him as second-in-command to Song Yi, who had been tasked with leading reinforcements to help the Zhao rebel group. At the same time, King Huai II sent Liu Bang to attack Guanzhong, the heartland of the Qin dynasty, promising both Xiang Yu and Liu Bang that whoever entered Guanzhong first would be made King of Guanzhong.

=== Battle of Julu ===
Song Yi and Xiang Yu headed to Anyang, some distance away from Julu Commandery, where the Zhao forces had retreated to after their defeat at Handan. At Anyang, Song Yi ordered the troops to make camp for 46 days, refusing to accept Xiang Yu's suggestion to advance further. Frustrated at Song Yi's inaction, Xiang Yu took him by surprise during a meeting, accused him of treason, and killed him. Song Yi's other subordinates feared Xiang Yu so they did not stop him from becoming their acting commander. Xiang Yu then sent a messenger to report the situation to King Huai II, who reluctantly approved his command.

In 207 BC, Xiang Yu advanced towards Julu Commandery, sending Ying Bu and Zhongli Mo to lead a 20,000-strong vanguard to cross the river and attack the Qin forces, while he followed behind with the rest of the troops. After crossing the river, Xiang Yu ordered his men to sink their boats and destroy all but three days worth of rations in order to force his men to choose between prevailing against overwhelming odds within three days and perishing with no hope of turning back. Despite being heavily outnumbered, the Chu forces scored a decisive victory against the 300,000-strong Qin army after nine engagements. After the battle, some other rebel groups came to join Xiang Yu out of admiration. When Xiang Yu met them at the entrance of his camp, the other rebel leaders were so fearful of him that they sank to their knees and did not dare to look up at him.

Meanwhile, the Qin general Zhang Han sent his deputy Sima Xin to the Qin capital Xianyang to seek reinforcements and supplies. However, the Qin government, which was under Zhao Gao's control, dismissed the request. Zhao Gao even sent assassins to kill Sima Xin on his way back to Julu Commandery, but Sima Xin survived and returned to report the situation to Zhang Han. Left with no choice, Zhang Han and his 200,000 Qin soldiers surrendered to Xiang Yu in the summer of 207 BC. Xiang Yu did not trust the 200,000 surrendered Qin soldiers and saw them as a liability, so he ordered them to be buried alive at Xin'an (新安; present-day Yima, Henan) while sparing Zhang Han and his deputies Sima Xin and Dong Yi.

=== Feast at Hong Gate ===
After his victory at the Battle of Julu, Xiang Yu prepared for an invasion of the Guanzhong region, the heartland of the Qin dynasty. In the winter of 207 BC, the last Qin emperor Ziying surrendered to Liu Bang in Xianyang, bringing an end to the Qin dynasty. By the time Xiang Yu arrived at Hangu Pass, the eastern gateway to Guanzhong, he saw that the pass was occupied by Liu Bang's troops and knew that Liu Bang had beat him in the race to Guanzhong. Cao Wushang (曹無傷), one of Liu Bang's subordinates, sent a messenger to see Xiang Yu, saying that Liu Bang would be King of Guanzhong in accordance with King Huai II's earlier promise, while Ziying would be appointed as Liu Bang's chancellor. Xiang Yu was furious after hearing that. At the time, Xiang Yu had about 400,000 troops while Liu Bang had only a quarter of that number.

Acting on Fan Zeng's advice, Xiang Yu invited Liu Bang to attend a feast at Swan Goose Gate and plotted to assassinate Liu Bang during the feast. However, Xiang Yu later listened to his uncle Xiang Bo and decided to spare Liu Bang, allowing Liu Bang to escape halfway during the feast.

In 206 BC, Xiang Yu paid no attention to Liu Bang's presumptive title and led his troops into Xianyang, where he executed Ziying and his family, and ordered the destruction of the Epang Palace by fire. It was said that Xiang Yu would leave behind a trail of destruction in the places he passed by, and the people of Guanzhong were greatly disappointed with him.

Acting against his followers' advice to remain in Guanzhong and continue with conquering the territories held by the other rebel groups, Xiang Yu was insistent on returning to his home territory. He said, "To not return home when one has made his fortune is equivalent to walking on the streets at night in glamorous outfits. Who would notice that?" One of his followers remarked, "It is indeed true when people say that the men of Chu are apes dressed in human clothing." Xiang Yu had that man boiled alive when he heard that insult.

== Division of the empire ==
In the spring of 206 BC, Xiang Yu promoted King Huai II, the nominal ruler of the Chu rebel group, to a more "honourable" title – Emperor Yi of Chu – and divided the territories of the former Qin dynasty into the Eighteen Kingdoms. He declared himself "Hegemon-King of Western Chu" and ruled nine commanderies in the former Liang and Chu states, with his kingdom's capital at Pengcheng (彭城; present-day Xuzhou, Jiangsu). The remaining kingdoms were granted to, among others, Xiang Yu's subordinates, some leaders of the other rebel groups, and the three surrendered Qin generals. The Guanzhong region, which was rightfully Liu Bang's according to the earlier promise by King Huai II, was instead given to the three surrendered Qin generals and collectively known as the Three Qins. Liu Bang, on the other hand, was relocated to the remote Hanzhong and given the title "King of Han".

Among the kings appointed by Xiang Yu, some were followers of the leaders of the other rebel groups, and the leaders themselves should rightfully be the kings instead of their followers. Xiang Yu also did not award titles to some rebel leaders who had not supported him earlier but had contributed to the overthrow of the Qin dynasty. In the winter of 206 BC, Xiang Yu moved Emperor Yi of Chu to the remote Chen County (郴縣; present-day Chenzhou, Hunan), effectively sending the puppet emperor into exile. In 205 BC, while en route to Chen County, Emperor Yi was assassinated by Ying Bu, the King of Jiujiang, who had been acting on Xiang Yu's order.

In late 206 BC, Xiang Yu executed Han Cheng, the King of Hán, and replaced him with Zheng Chang. Some months later, Tian Rong seized control of the former Qi territories – divided into the Jiaodong, Qi and Jibei kingdoms – from their respective kings appointed by Xiang Yu, and declared himself the King of Qi. In the former Zhao territories, Chen Yu led an uprising against Zhang Er, the King of Changshan appointed by Xiang Yu, seized control of Changshan, restored Zhao, and reinstalled Zhao Xie, the pre-division King of Zhao, as the king.

== Chu–Han Contention ==
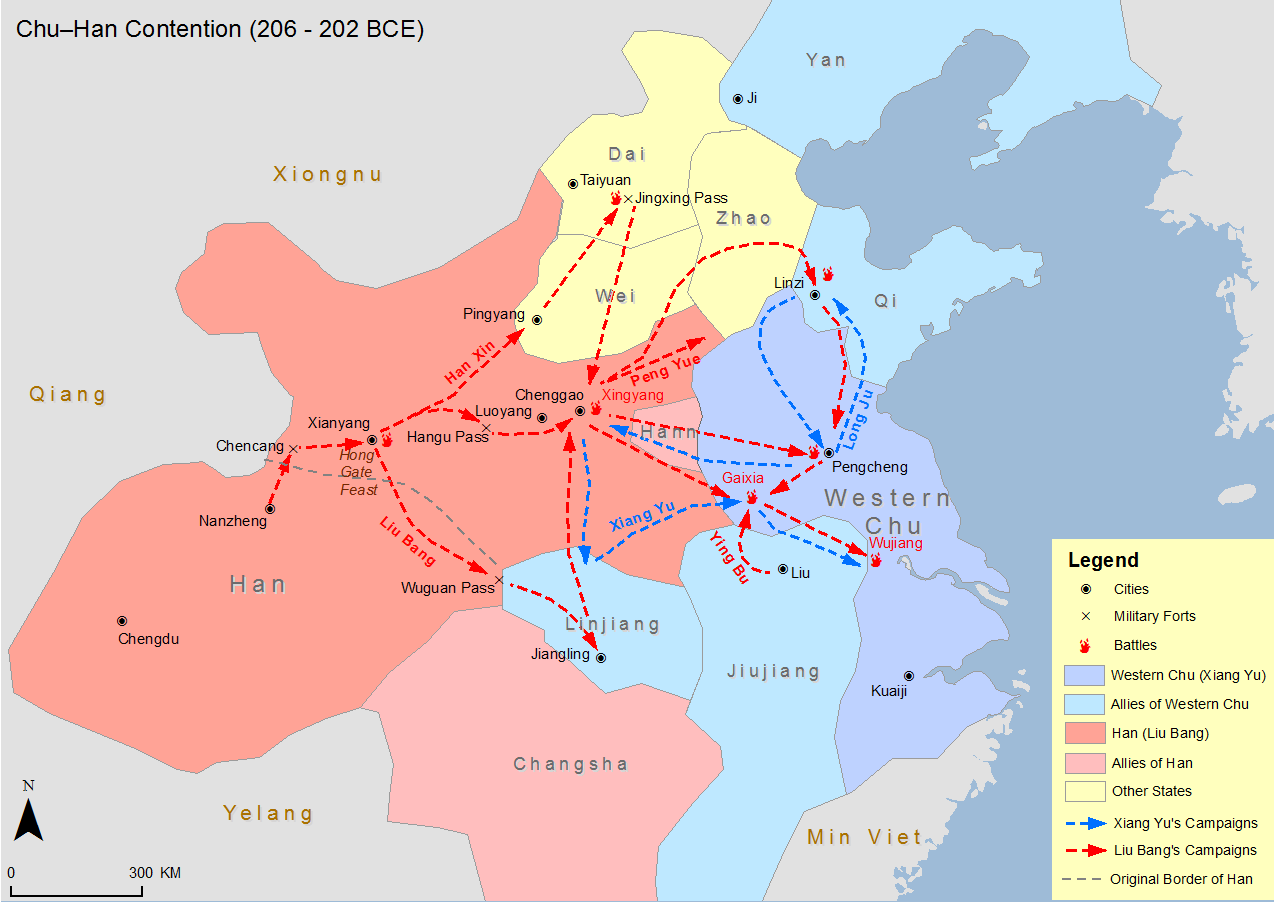
Map of the Chu–Han Contention

=== Battle of Pengcheng ===
In 206 BC, Liu Bang led his forces to attack the Three Qins in the Guanzhong region. At the time, Xiang Yu was away on a campaign in the Qi territories against Tian Rong and did not pay much attention to Liu Bang's invasion.

The following year, Liu Bang formed an alliance with another five kingdoms and attacked Xiang Yu with a 560,000-strong army, capturing the Western Chu capital Pengcheng.

Upon hearing this, Xiang Yu turned back from Qi and led 30,000 troops to attack Liu Bang, defeating and inflicting heavy casualties on the latter's forces at the Battle of Pengcheng.

=== Battle of Xingyang ===
After losing Pengcheng, Liu Bang retreated to Xingyang with Xiang Yu in pursuit. At Xingyang, Liu Bang managed to hold his position against Xiang Yu until 204 BC. Ji Xin, one of Liu Bang's subordinates who resembled his lord in appearance, disguised himself as Liu Bang and pretended to surrender to Xiang Yu, buying time for Liu Bang to escape. When Xiang Yu learnt that he had been fooled, he had Ji Xin burnt to death.

After the fall of Xingyang, the Chu and Han forces respectively occupied the territories east and west of present-day Henan. On the battlefront north of the Yellow River, Xiang Yu's forces were not faring well as Han Xin, one of Liu Bang's generals, had conquered the Zhao kingdom and defeated Xiang Yu's general Long Ju at the Battle of Wei River. Concurrently, Peng Yue, Liu Bang's ally, was constantly launching guerrilla-style attacks on Xiang Yu's territories in the east.

=== Treaty of Hong Canal ===
By 203 BC, the tide had turned in Liu Bang's favour. After a year-long siege, Xiang Yu managed to capture Liu Bang's father and threatened to boil him alive if Liu Bang refused to surrender to him. Liu Bang remarked that since he and Xiang Yu had become oath brothers earlier in a ceremony in 208 BC, Xiang Yu would, in the eyes of everyone, be deemed guilty of patricide if he killed Liu Bang's father. Both sides ultimately agreed to make peace in an event known as the Treaty of Hong Canal, which divided China into east and west under Xiang Yu and Liu Bang's control respectively. Xiang Yu also released Liu Bang's father and other hostages he had captured earlier.

=== Battle of Guling ===
Shortly after, Liu Bang renounced the peace agreement and attacked Xiang Yu while the latter was heading back to Pengcheng. At the same time, he sent messengers to Han Xin and Peng Yue, requesting them to join him in attacking Xiang Yu on three fronts. However, Han Xin and Peng Yue did not mobilise their forces, so Liu Bang ended up being defeated by Xiang Yu at the Battle of Guling. After his defeat, Liu Bang retreated to strengthen his defences, while concurrently sending messengers to meet Han Xin and Peng Yue again, promising to make them kings and grant them territories if they helped him defeat Xiang Yu.

=== Defeat and death ===
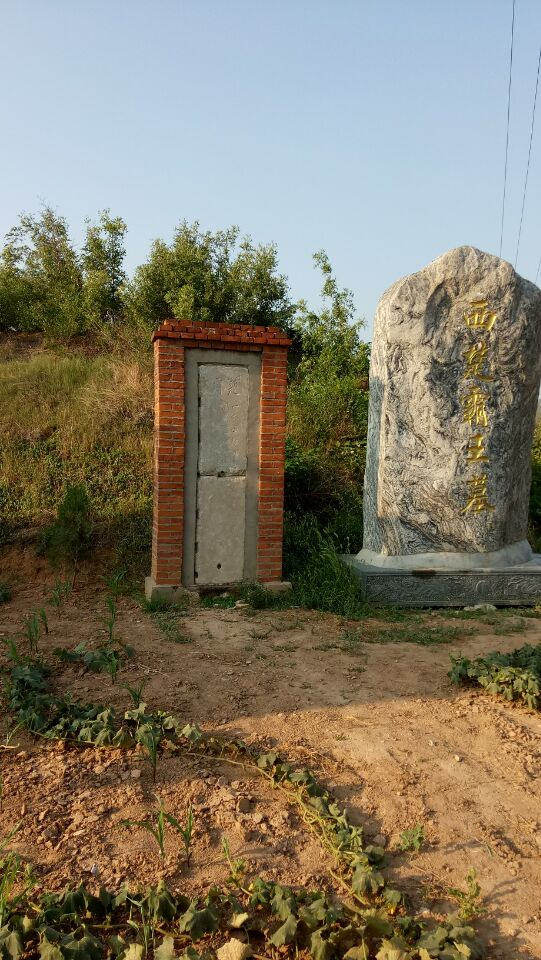
Tomb of Xiang Yu in Dongping County, Shandong

In 202 BC, the combined forces of Liu Bang, Han Xin and Peng Yue attacked Xiang Yu from three fronts and managed to trap Xiang Yu's forces, which were running low on supplies, at Gaixia (垓下; in present-day Anhui). Han Xin ordered his men to sing folk songs from the Chu territories to evoke feelings of nostalgia among the Chu soldiers and create the impression that many Chu soldiers had surrendered and joined the Han forces. The morale of Xiang Yu's forces plummeted and many of them deserted. Xiang Yu, in despair, composed the "Song of Gaixia" while his wife Consort Yu committed suicide.

The next morning, Xiang Yu led about 800 of his remaining elite horsemen on a desperate attempt to break out of the siege, with 5,000 enemy troops in pursuit. After crossing the Huai River, Xiang Yu was left with only a few hundred men. They lost their way so Xiang Yu asked for directions from a farmer, who directed him wrongly to a swamp. By the time they reached Dongcheng (東城; in present-day Dingyuan County, Anhui), Xiang Yu had only 28 men left. There, he made a speech, declaring that his downfall was due to Heaven's will and not his personal failures.

After that, Xiang Yu led his men to break out of the encirclement, killing one Han officer in the process. He then split his remaining men into three groups to confuse the enemy and induce them to split up too to attack the groups. In doing so, he took the enemy by surprise and killed another Han officer, inflicting about 100 casualties on them while losing only two men.

Xiang Yu retreated to the bank of the Wu River (烏江; near present-day He County, Anhui), where the ferryman at the ford had prepared a boat for him to cross the river to the Jiangdong region where Xiang Yu's hometown was. The ferryman urged him to retreat to Jiangdong, saying that he still had the support of the people there. However, Xiang Yu replied that he was too ashamed to return home and face the people because all the 8,000 men from Jiangdong he had first brought along into battle had all perished. He refused to cross the river and ordered his remaining men to dismount while asking the ferryman to take his warhorse, Zhui (騅), back home.

Xiang Yu and his men made a last stand against wave after wave of Han forces until only Xiang Yu himself was still alive. Continuing to fight fiercely, he killed over 100 enemy soldiers but also sustained several wounds all over his body. Just then, he recognised an old friend, Lü Matong (呂馬童), among the Han soldiers, so he called out to him: "I heard that the King of Han (Liu Bang) has placed a price of 1,000 gold and the title of "Wanhu Marquis" (萬戶侯; "marquis of 10,000 households") on my head. Take it then, on account of our past friendship." Xiang Yu then committed suicide by slitting his throat with his sword. A brawl broke out among the Han soldiers over Xiang Yu's dead body as they were eager to claim the reward; Xiang Yu's body was dismembered and mutilated in the process. Liu Bang eventually divided the reward among Lü Matong and four others who showed up with Xiang Yu's body parts.

After Xiang Yu's death, the rest of Western Chu surrendered and China was unified under Liu Bang's rule, marking the start of the Han dynasty. Liu Bang held a funeral for Xiang Yu in Gucheng (穀城; in present-day Dongping County, Shandong), with the ceremony befitting Xiang Yu's earlier title "Duke of Lu". He also spared the lives of Xiang Yu's relatives, including Xiang Yu's uncle Xiang Bo who had saved his life during the Feast at Swan Goose Gate, and made them marquises.

== Evaluation ==
=== Classical ===
The historian Sima Qian, who wrote Xiang Yu's biography in the Shi Ji, described him as someone who boasted about his achievements and thought highly of himself. Xiang Yu preferred to depend on his personal abilities as opposed to learning with humility from others. In Sima Qian's view, Xiang Yu had not only failed to recognise his own shortcomings, but also failed to make attempts to correct his mistakes. Sima Qian felt that it was ridiculous for Xiang Yu to attribute his downfall to Heaven's will instead of his personal failures. As Xiang Yu had ordered massacres of entire populations of cities even after they had surrendered peacefully, his cruelty had led to cities putting up strong resistance since they believed they would be killed even if they surrendered to him. The most notorious example of his cruelty was after the Battle of Julu when he ordered the 200,000 surrendered Qin soldiers to be buried alive. Other instances included the gruesome methods of execution he employed against his enemies and critics. In contrast, Liu Bang was a shrewd and cunning ruler who was sometimes ruthless too, but had made the wiser choice in forbidding his troops from looting the cities they had captured and sparing the lives of the citizens, earning their support and trust in return. Xiang Yu became an example for Confucianists to advocate the idea that leaders should rule with benevolence and not govern by instilling fear in the people. Xiang Yu's ambitions ended with the collapse of Western Chu, his defeat by Liu Bang, and his death at an early age.

Han Xin once described Xiang Yu as follows: "A man who turns into a fierce warrior when he encounters a rival stronger than he is, but also one who is sympathetic and soft-hearted when he sees someone weaker than he is. He was neither able to make good use of capable generals nor able to support Emperor Yi of Chu; he showed no mercy at all in battle. Even though he was a Hegemon-King in name, he had already lost the people's hearts."

The Tang dynasty poet Du Mu mentioned Xiang Yu in a poem: "Victory or defeat is common in battle. One who can endure humiliation is a true man. There are several talents in Jiangdong. Who knows if he (Xiang Yu) can make a comeback?" The Song dynasty poet Wang Anshi had a different opinion wrote: "The warrior is already tired after so many battles. His defeat in the Central Plains is hard to reverse. Although there are talents in Jiangdong, are they willing to help him?" The Song dynasty poet Li Qingzhao wrote: "A hero in life; a king of ghosts after death. Until now, we still remember Xiang Yu, who refused to return to Jiangdong."

Xiang Yu is popularly viewed as a leader who possessed great courage but lacked wisdom, and his character is aptly summarised using the Chinese idiom 有勇無謀, meaning "has courage but lacks tactics", or "foolhardy". Another Chinese idiom 四面楚歌; 'surrounded by Chu songs', was also derived from the Battle of Gaixia, and used to describe someone in a desperate situation without help. Another saying by Liu Bang, "Having a Fan Zeng but unable to use him" (有一范增而不能用), was also used to describe Xiang Yu's reliance on Fan Zeng and failure to actually listen to Fan Zeng's advice.

=== Modern era ===
Modern historians have drawn similarities between Xiang Yu's military brilliance and that of his Mediterranean contemporary Hannibal. Researchers emphasised Xiang Yu's strategic thinking, while also exploiting any opportunities to launch a surprise attack in the morning under the cover of darkness, as Xiang Yu was outstanding in this regard. His tactical early morning raids on the enemy fully demonstrated his superb strategy of mobilization and artistic prowess, despite facing unprecedented crises.

Mao Zedong also once mentioned Xiang Yu: "We should use our remaining strength to defeat the enemy, instead of thinking about achieving fame like the Hegemon-King." In 1964, Mao also pointed out three reasons for Xiang Yu's downfall: not following Fan Zeng's advice to kill Liu Bang during the Feast at Swan Goose Gate and letting Liu Bang escape; adhering firmly to the terms of the Treaty of Hong Canal without considering that Liu Bang might betray his trust; building his capital at Pengcheng.

== In popular culture ==
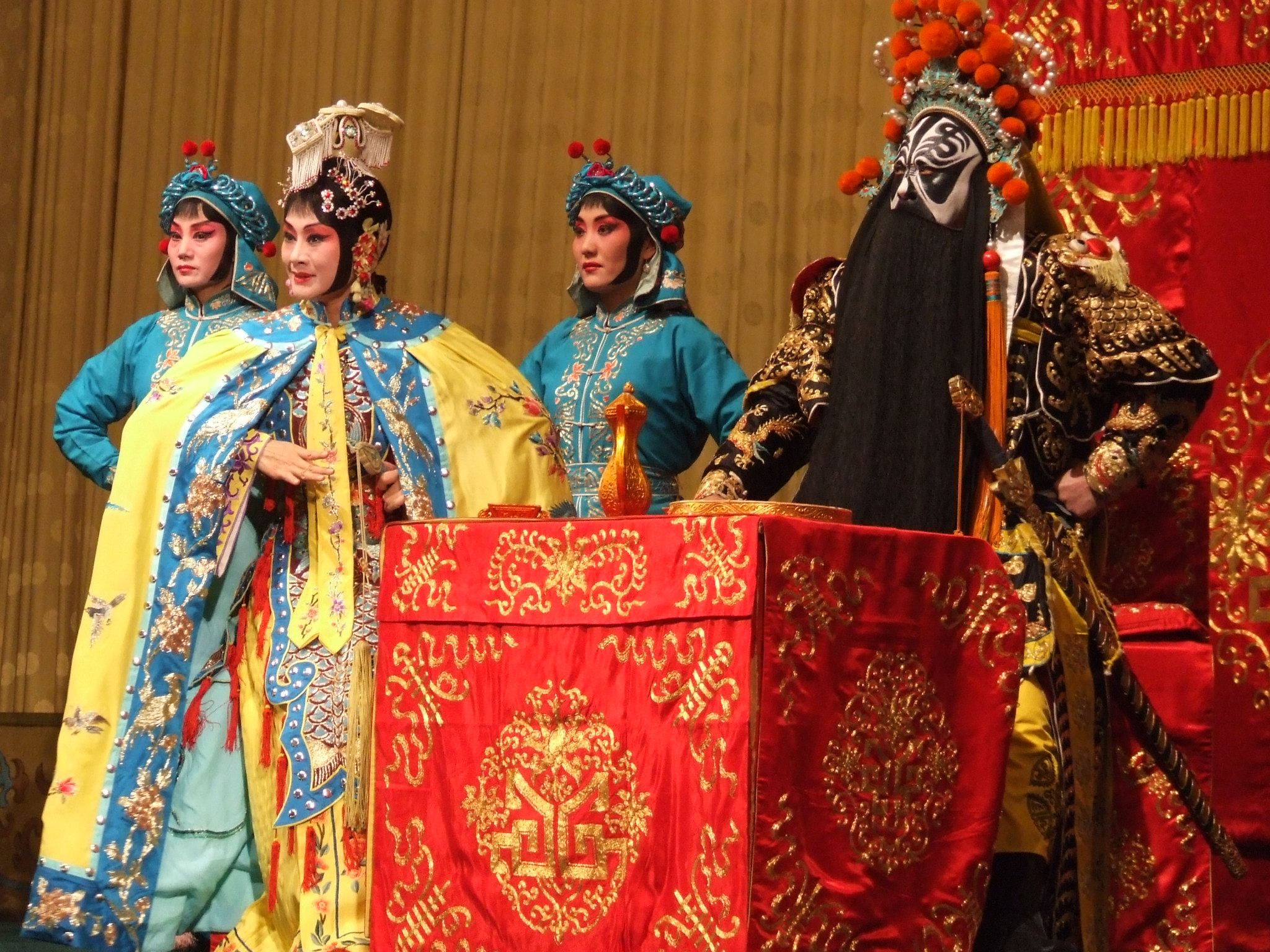
The celebrated Peking Opera episode Farewell My Concubine portrays Xiang Yu during his final days at Gaixia

=== Song of Gaixia ===
The "Song of Gaixia" (垓下歌) was composed by Xiang Yu during the Battle of Gaixia. The lyrics in English as follows are Burton Watson's translation:

《垓下歌》
力拔山兮氣蓋世,
時不利兮騅不逝.
騅不逝兮可奈何!
虞兮虞兮奈若何!

Translation:

The Hegemon's Lament
My strength plucked up the hills,
My might shadowed the world;
But the times were against me,
And Dapple (Note: "Dapple" is Watson's translation of the name of Xiang Yu's warhorse Zhui (騅)) runs no more;
When Dapple runs no more,
What then can I do?
Ah, Yu, my Yu,
What will your fate be?

Xiang Yu's prowess in battle has been glorified in Chinese folk tales, poetry, and novels, and he has been the subject of films, television, plays, operas, video games and comics. His classic image is that of a heroic and brave, but arrogant and bloodthirsty warrior-king. His romance with his wife Consort Yu and his suicide have also added a touch of a tragic hero to his character.

=== Poetry, folk tales, novels ===
Xiang Yu's prowess in battle is mentioned in Chinese folk tales and poetry, particularly during the Battle of Gaixia. The Meng Qiu (蒙求), an eighth-century primer by the scholar Li Han, contains the four-character rhyming couplet "Ji Xin impersonates the Emperor". It referred to the incident during the Battle of Xingyang in 205 BC when Ji Xin and 2,000 women disguised themselves as Liu Bang and his troops to distract Xiang Yu and buy time for Liu Bang to escape.

In the 14th-century classical novel Romance of the Three Kingdoms, the warlord Sun Ce is nicknamed "Little Conqueror / Little Hegemon-King" (小霸王) and compared favourably to Xiang Yu by a contemporary just like his historical counterpart. Sun Ce is best known for his conquests in the Jiangdong region that laid the foundation of the state of Eastern Wu during the Three Kingdoms period.

In another 14th-century classical novel Water Margin, Zhou Tong, one of the 108 Stars of Destiny, is nicknamed "Little Conqueror" for having an appearance similar to Xiang Yu's.

In the 16th-century novel Jin Ping Mei, Xiang Yu is mentioned as an example of a tragic character in the song at the opening of the first chapter.

The character Mata Zyndu in Ken Liu's epic fantasy novel The Grace of Kings is based on Xiang Yu.

=== Operas ===
The Beijing opera The Hegemon-King Bids His Lady Farewell depicts the events of Xiang Yu's defeat at the Battle of Gaixia. The title of the play was borrowed as the Chinese title for Chen Kaige's 1993 award-winning film Farewell My Concubine.

=== Film and television ===
Notable actors who have portrayed Xiang Yu in films and television series include: Shek Sau in The Battlefield (1985); Ray Lui in The Great Conqueror's Concubine (1994); Hu Jun in The Story of Han Dynasty (2003); Kwong Wah in The Conqueror's Story (2004); Tan Kai in The Myth (2010); Feng Shaofeng in White Vengeance (2011); Peter Ho in King's War (2012); Ming Dao in Beauties of the Emperor (2012); Daniel Wu in The Last Supper (2012); and Qin Junjie in The Legend of Qin (2015).

Hegemon-King of Western Chu House of Xiang Born: 232 BC Died: 202 BC
Titles in pretence
Preceded by Emperor Yi of Chu	— TITULAR — Hegemon-King of Western Chu; 206–202 BC; Reason for succession failure: Chu–Han Contention	Succeeded by Han Xin as King of Chu
Preceded by Emperor Yi of Chu	— TITULAR — Emperor of China; 206–202 BC; Reason for succession failure: Chu–Han Contention	Succeeded by Emperor Gaozu of Han
