= Chenggao =

Ancient county in present-day Sishui, China

Coordinates: 34°51′N 113°12′E

- Traditional Chinese: 成皋
- Simplified Chinese: 成皋
- Hanyu Pinyin: Chénggāo
Transcriptions
Standard Mandarin
- Hanyu Pinyin: Chénggāo
- Wade–Giles: Ch'eng^{2}-kao^{1}

Chenggao is an ancient county in present-day Sishui, which is under the jurisdiction of Xingyang City in Henan Province, People's Republic of China.
