= The Conqueror's Story =

Hong Kong television series

- DVD cover art
- Also known as: Chor Hon Kiu Hung
- Traditional Chinese: 楚漢驕雄
- Simplified Chinese: 楚汉骄雄
- Literal meaning: Proud Heroes of Chu and Han
- Hanyu Pinyin: Chǔ Hàn Jiāo Xíong
- Jyutping: Co2 Hon3 Giu1 Hung4
- Genre: Historical drama
- Written by: Leung Wing-mui; Cheung Wa-biu; Sin Siu-ling; Mak Sai-lung; Ma Chi-kan; Chan Bo-yin
- Directed by: Wong Kok-keung; Chu Lai-wo; Ng Koon-ching; Wong Kin-fan; Chan Seung-kuen
- Starring: Adam Cheng; Kwong Wa; Maggie Cheung; Melissa Ng
- Opening theme: Juet Sai Hung Choi (絕世雄才) performed by Adam Cheng
- Ending theme: Chi Sam Yau Kei Nung (癡心有幾濃) performed by Kwong Wah and Kitman Mak
- Composers: Mo Leung-kwong; Cheng Kwok-kong
- Country of origin: Hong Kong
- Original language: Cantonese
- No. of episodes: 30

Production
- Executive producer: Lee Tim-shing
- Production location: Hong Kong
- Production company: TVB

Original release
- Network: TVB Jade
- Release: 25 October – 4 December 2004

The Conqueror's Story is a Hong Kong television series based on the events in the Chu–Han Contention, an interregnum between the fall of the Qin dynasty and the founding of the Han dynasty in Chinese history. It was first broadcast in 2004 in Hong Kong on TVB Jade.

== Plot ==
The plot follows a story-by-story pattern, with each episode featuring an event before and during the Chu–Han Contention. A cast member explains the background of the story in the prologue of each episode.

== Pre-episode extras ==
Prior to the start of each episode is an extra scene that provides an explanation to a certain main point within that episode, many of which have been enshrined in history books, or have become idioms frequently used in modern Chinese society.

#	Rough translation of title (in English)	Original title (in Chinese)	Presenter
1	Rising in rebellion	揭竿起義	Cheung Chi-kwong
2	Street rascal	市井之徒	Ng May-hang
3	Uprising of the Slaying of the White Serpent	斬白蛇起義	Law Lok-lam
4	Evaluation of the First Emperor	秦始皇功過	Cheng Chi-sing
5	The Second Emperor	二世祖	Lam Wai-san
6	Beauty Yu	虞美人	Ka Bik-yee
7	Humiliation of crawling between another person's legs	胯下之辱	Cheung Chi-kwong
8	Li Yiji	酈食其	Law Lok-lam
9	Zhang Liang's plan	張良計	Lam Wai-san
10	King Huai of Chu	楚懷王	Cheng Chi-sing
11	A subject's title	卿子冠軍	Ng May-hang
12	Breaking cauldrons and sinking boats	破釜沉舟	Adam Cheng
13	To call a deer a horse	指鹿爲馬	Henry Lo
14	Three conditions in an agreement	約法三章	Cheung Chi-kwong
15	Feast at Hong Gate	鴻門夜宴	Ngai Wai
16	Apes bathed and dressed in human clothes	沐猴而冠	Wayne Lai
17	Out with the old, in with the new	推陳出新	Mak Ka-lun
18	Xiao He chases Han Xin under the moonlight	蕭何月下追韓信	Siu Chuen-yung
19	Pretending to repair the gallery roads while secretly passing through Chencang	明修棧道 暗渡陳倉	Adam Cheng
20	Reverse Strategy	反間計	Henry Lo
21	When Han Xin selects his soldiers, the more the better	韓信點兵 多多益善	Lam Wai-san
22	The Battle of Sui River	睢水之戰	Ngai Wai
23	Traveling at night dressed in glamorous outfits	錦衣夜行	Wayne Lai
24	Ancient torture methods	古代極刑	Ka Bik-yee
25	The fake king of Qi	假齊王	Siu Chuen-yung
26	Offer me a bowl of broth	分我杯羹	Ng May-hang
27	Going back on one's words	出爾反爾	Cheng Chi-sing
28	The Hong Canal	鴻溝	Law Lok-lam
29	Surrounded by Chu songs	四面楚歌	Mak Ka-lun
30	Too ashamed to face my folks from Jiangdong	無面目見江東父老	Adam Cheng

== Cast ==
Note: Some of the characters' names are in Cantonese romanisation.

- Adam Cheng as Lau Bong
- Kwong Wa as Hong Yu
- Maggie Cheung Ho-yee as Lui Chi
- Melissa Ng as Consort Yu
- Law Lok-lam as Fan Tsang
- Wong Chak-fung as Hung Chong
- Wong Chun-tong as Ying Bo
- Kong Hon as Hung Leung
- Chan Hung-lit as Hung Bak
- Yau Biu as Lung Chui
- Mak Ka-lun as Chung-lei Mui
- Siu Chuk-yiu as Yu Tze-kei
- Wayne Lai as Hon Sun
- Ram Chiang as Cheung Leung
- Ngai Wai as Fan Fai
- Gilbert Lam as Chan Ping
- Chan Wing-chun as Ha-hau Ying
- Henry Lo as Siu Ho
- Timothy Siu as Cho Sam
- Yu Tze-ming as Lik Yik-kei
- Cerina da Graca as Consort Chik
- Sherming Yiu as Lady Heung
- Angela Tong as Consort Bok
- Chan Kwan as Lau Ying
- Kwok Chuk-wah as Kei Shun
- Sun Kwai-hing as Lau Bong's father
- Liu Lai-lai as Lau Bong's mother
- Ngo Ka-nin as Chor Yi Dai
- Wong Ching as Sung Yi
- Lau Kong as Lui Man
- Mike Wong as Chun Chi Wong
- Law Kwan-chor as Chiu Ko
- Lee Wing-ho as Wu-hoi
- Lee Wing-hon as Tze-ying
- Cheung Tat-lun as Lui Bat-wai
- Ho Yin-chung as Fu-so
- Doi Chi-wai as Cheung Ping
- Choi Kok-hing as Cheung Hum
- Kwan Ching as Tung Yi
- Wah Chung-nam as Sze-ma Yan
- Chiu Man-tung as Chan Sing
- Tsui Wing as Ng Kwong
- Lee Hung-kit as Ngai Pau
- Wong Man-biu as Pang Yut
- Cheng Ka-sang as Cheung Yee
- Lee Hoi-sang as Chan Yu
- Tang Yu-chiu as Tin Do
- Cheung Hon-ban as Ng Jui
- Kwok Tak-shun as Hon Sun, King of Hon
- Joe Junior as Gak-lung
- Yiu Ying-ying as Yan Cheung
- Ngan Lai-jui as Princess Lo-yuen
- Cheng Chi-sing as Yung Chi
