= King's War =

- Poster
- Also known as: Legend of Chu and Han
- 楚汉传奇
- Genre: Historical drama
- Written by: Wang Peigong; Wang Hailin; Yan Gang
- Directed by: Gao Xixi
- Creative director: Wang Yitao
- Presented by: Yu Dong; Chi Yufeng; Ouyang Changlin; Yang Shoucheng; Wang Xiaodong; Zhang Suzhou; Wan Ke; Wang Tongyuan; Zhao Shuqing; Gu Yongqiang; Luo Hao; He Ling
- Starring: Chen Daoming; Peter Ho; Duan Yihong; Qin Lan; Li Yixiao; Sun Haiying; Yang Lixin; You Yong
- Opening theme: "Heroes Under Heaven" (天下英雄) performed by Han Lei
- Ending theme: "Live for Love" (为爱而生) performed by Song Zuying
- Composer: Xu Peidong
- Country of origin: China
- Original language: Mandarin
- No. of episodes: 80

Production
- Executive producers: Zhao Duojia; Zhang Huali; Zhao Hongmei; Kong Lingquan; Cheng Weidong; Gu Shunkun; Guo Man Zheng Gang; Xue Huixuan; Ding Yilan; Guo Li
- Producers: Jiang Zhong; Mu Xiaohui
- Production location: China
- Cinematography: Niu Mingshan; Guo Qingrui; Zhang Yong; Li Li
- Running time: ≈45 minutes per episode
- Production companies: Bona Film Group; Beijing Xishiji Film and TV Culture Development

Original release
- Network: Anhui TV; Zhejiang TV; Jiangxi TV; Tianjin TV
- Release: 28 December 2012

King's War (楚汉传奇), also known as Legend of Chu and Han, is a Chinese historical drama television series based on the events of the late Qin dynasty and the Chu–Han Contention (206–202 BC) leading to the establishment of the Han dynasty in China. Directed by Gao Xixi, the series starred Chen Daoming as Liu Bang, the founding emperor of the Han dynasty, and Peter Ho as Liu Bang's rival Xiang Yu. It started airing on Anhui TV, Zhejiang TV, Jiangxi TV and Tianjin TV on 28 December 2012.

The show began streaming on Netflix in 2017.

== Synopsis ==
The series is set in China in the late third century BC during the Qin dynasty, which had conquered the other six Warring States and unified China under the rule of the First Emperor in 221 BC.

As the Qin dynasty governed with brutal and oppressive policies, it had incurred much resentment from the common people, so rebellions broke out in 209 BC shortly after the First Emperor's death. Among the rebels, two prominent leaders – Liu Bang and Xiang Yu – emerged and worked together to overthrow the Qin dynasty by 206 BC.

After the fall of the Qin dynasty, Liu Bang and Xiang Yu engaged in a power struggle, historically known as the Chu–Han Contention, for supremacy over China. The war ended in 202 BC with victory for Liu Bang, who became the emperor and established the Han dynasty as the ruling dynasty in China.

== Cast ==
- Chen Daoming as Liu Bang
- Peter Ho as Xiang Yu
- Duan Yihong as Han Xin
- Yang Lixin as Xiao He
- Qin Lan as Lü Zhi
- Li Yixiao as Consort Yu
- Sun Haiying as Fan Zeng
- You Yong as Yong Chi
- Huo Qing as Zhang Liang
- Kang Kai as Fan Kuai
- Wang Jishi as Lu Wan
- Zhang Chenghao as Zhou Bo
- Fan Yulin as Long Ju
- Zhu Yanping as Xiang Liang
- Cai Yida as Xiang Zhuang
- Xu Maomao as Xiang Bo
- Hu Dong as Ying Bu
- Yu Hewei as Qin Shi Huang
- Elvis Tsui as Wei Bao
- Xu Wenguang as Zhao Gao
- Li Jianxin as Li Si
- Yu Bin as Huhai
- Cao Weiyu as Zhang Han
- Wang Hualong as Ziying
- Lin Peng as Xiahou Ying
- Shi Weijian as Li Yiji
- Tang Yan as Consort Qi
- Xu Yang as Consort Bo
- Yu Mingjia as Consort Cao
- Wu Gang as Shen Yiji
- Ji Chenmu as King Huai II of Chu
- Liu Jingfan as Peng Yue
- Shi Yanjing as Li Zuoche
- Peng Guobin as Ji Xin
- Zhang Jingyuan as Chen Ping
- Lu Yong as Guan Ying
- Zheng Jingyuan as Zhou Ke
- Xu Xiaojian as Cao Shen
- Yang Yucheng as Sui He
- Liu Zifeng as Liu Taigong
- Wang Jun as Cao Wushang
- Xu Fengnian as Chen Yu
- Li Bingyuan as Ji Bu
- Ye Peng as Zhongli Mo
- Yang Ziduo as Yu Ziqi
- Yan Pei as Song Yi
- Zhang Xiqian as Zhang Er
- Liu Guanghou as Shusun Tong
- Wu Xiaodong as Sima Xin
- Liu Jingxi as Liu Bang's mother
- Zheng Tianyong as Lü Taigong
- Siqin Gaowa Nanji as Chenxi
- Xu Wanqiu as Lü Xu
- Guo Ketong as Xiaoxian
- Zhang Ruibo as Liu Fei
- Dong Chunming as Liu Ying
- Yang Zhiwen as Liu Le
- Long Wu as Canghai Jun
- Wang Pu as Weisheng
- Gong Xiaorong as Ruojiang
- Wang Weiguo as Yin Tong
- Li Yansheng as the magistrate of Pei County
- Yang Rui as Ren Ao
- Da Youwei as Li Liang
- Shang Yue as Song Xiang
- Song Laiyun as Wang Li
- Ren Mingsheng as Lü Ze
- Dong Ming as the magistrate of Chenliu
- Zhou Dianying as the administrator of Nanyang
- Liu Xiaoxiao as Jitao
- Bi Haifeng as Wang Ling
- Miao Luoyi as Liyuan
- Wang Yi as Chunyu Yue
- Li He as Lüyi
- Fu Hongjun as Master Zhong
- Guo Wenxue as Tian Heng
- Hu Jingpei as Marquis Gangwu
- Ji Chenggong as Kuai Che
- Li Chengfeng as Su Jiao
- Li Gen as Zhang Ping
- Lin Feng as Tian Guang
- Luo Ming as Ying Gao
- Song Li as Cao Jiu
- Sun Ning as Han Cheng
- Wang Ming as Ziying's daughter
- Wen Haifeng as Wu She
- Yang Guang as Huan Chu
- Zhang Xinhua as Chong Xin
- Zheng Wei as Liu Ruyi

== Production ==
King's War is the second historical drama television series directed by Gao Xixi after Three Kingdoms (2010). The production cost for King's War was expected to break records as Bona Film Group announced on 8 June 2011 that it would provide Gao with a budget of 1.7 billion yuan for the project, excluding the costs for possible future expansions.

Shooting started on 25 August 2011 and ended on 5 May 2012.

=== Set construction ===
According to reports, apart from its huge budget, one of the highlights of the series is its realistic sets. The palace, along with other important locations in the television series, had to be totally reconstructed in accordance with the requirements stated in the script. The sets were expected to be completed by July 2011.

=== Casting ===
Chen Daoming formally signed on to portray Liu Bang. On 25 August 2011, Gao Xixi appeared in public with six confirmed members of the cast, including Chen, Peter Ho and Hu Dong. Chen had been confirmed as Liu Bang while Ho was a likely choice for Xiang Yu.

=== Script ===
Wang Peigong spent years creating the script for King's War. Gao Xixi said in an interview, "Peigong and I would discuss about King's War when we have time. It has been four years, I believe the time is ripe now. The story will begin from Liu Bang starting off as a patrol officer in Pei County, until he established the Han dynasty and became the emperor. This series will not follow the narrative style of historical dramas. The clever part about Legend of Chu and Han lies in the word Legend."

=== English dub ===
On 15 August 2015, an English dub of all 80 episodes was completed for release on South African Cable Television.

== Reception ==
When the series received average ratings, Gao Xixi claimed that it was attracting a highly educated audience.

=== Awards and nominations ===
Year	Award	Category	Nominated work	Result
2014	1st Hengdian Film and TV Festival of China	Best Actor	Peter Ho	Won
2014	1st Hengdian Film and TV Festival of China	Best Actress	Li Yixiao	Won

== International broadcast ==
Country	Network(s)/Station(s)	Series premiere	Title
Thailand	True4U	August 10, 2015	ฉู่ฮั่น ศึกชิงบัลลังก์ สะท้านปฐพี (Chu Han Suek Ching Ballang Sataan Pattapi)
