= Zhang Liang (Western Han) =

Chinese strategist (c. 251 BC - 189 BC)

Marquess of Liu Zhang Liang
- 張良
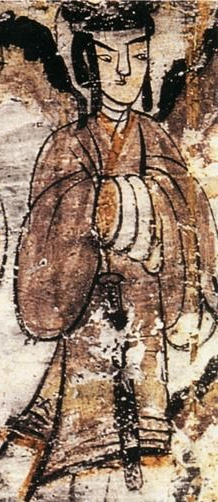
- The portrait of Zhang Liang in the Western Han dynasty murals depicting the Hongmen Banquet, now in the Luoyang Ancient Tombs Museum.

Personal details
- Born: c. 251 BC
- Died: 189 BC (aged 62)
- Occupation: Military strategist, politician
- Courtesy name: Zifang (子房)
- Posthumous name: Wencheng (文成)

Note: In this article, to distinguish between the Han state of the Warring States period and the Han dynasty, the former is referred to as "Hán" while "Han" is reserved for the latter.

Zhang Liang (c. 251 BC – 189 BC), courtesy name Zifang (子房), was a Chinese military strategist and politician who lived in the early Western Han dynasty. He is also known as one of the "Three prominences of the early Han dynasty" (漢初三傑), along with Han Xin (韓信) and Xiao He.

Zhang Liang contributed greatly to the establishment of the Han dynasty. He was enfeoffed as the Marquess of Liu (留侯) with estates in Liu County (留縣, in modern day Pei County). He was honoured with the posthumous name Wencheng (Chinese: 文成; lit. 'Civilly Accomplished') by Emperor Qianshao.

== Early life ==
Zhang Liang was born in Xinzheng (新鄭; present-day Zhengzhou, Henan), the capital of the Hán state (韓國), while his ancestral home was in Chengfu (城父; present-day Chengfu Town, Bozhou, Anhui). He descended from an aristocrat family in Hán. His grandfather served three generations of the Hán rulers as chancellors while his father served two generations. Zhang Liang missed the opportunity to inherit his family's legacy as the Hán state was annexed by the Qin state in 230 BC as part of Qin's wars of unification.

== As a fugitive ==
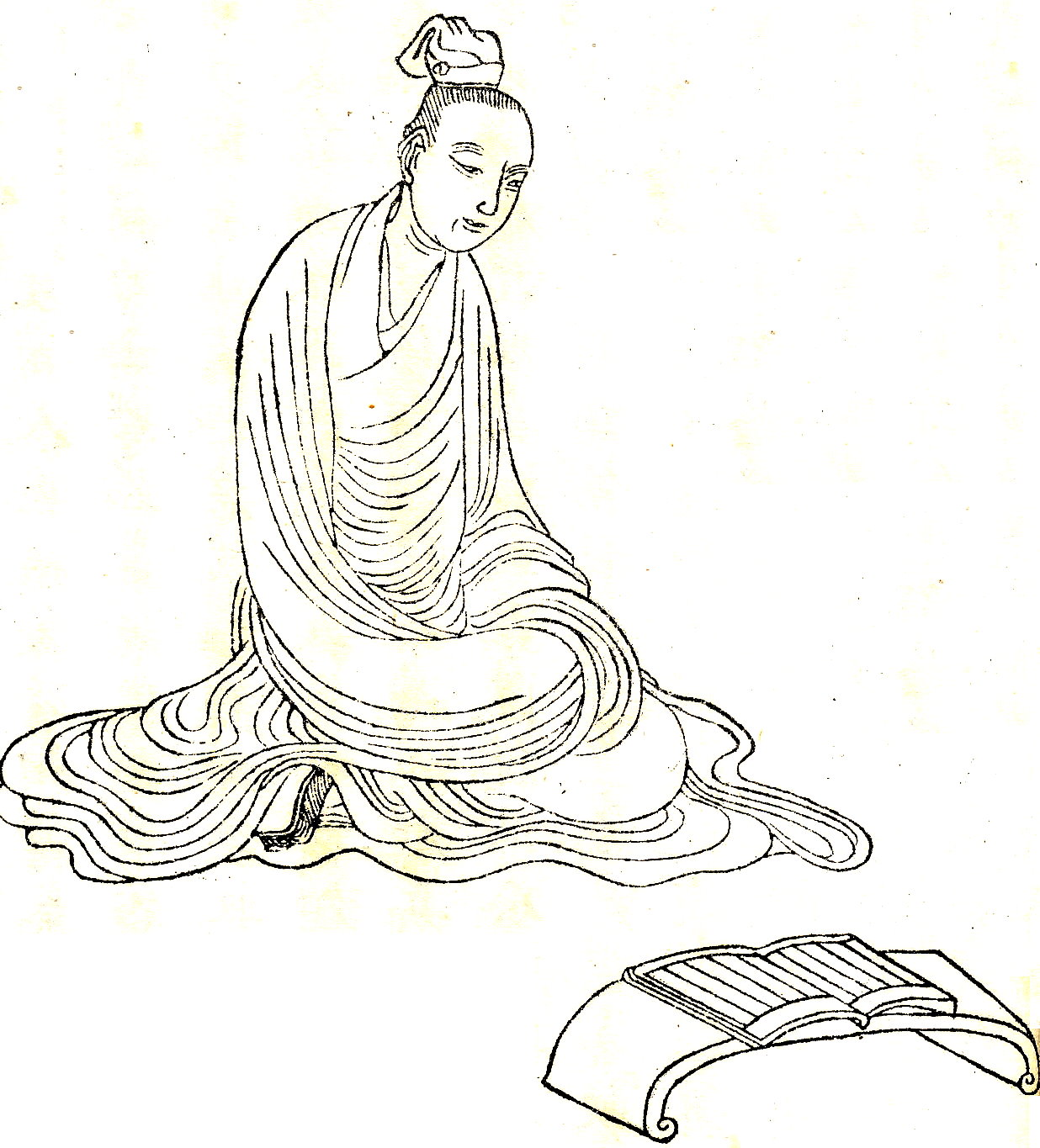
A Qing dynasty illustration of Zhang Liang in the Wanxiaotang Huachuan (1743), by Shangguan Zhou.

=== Assassination attempt on Qin Emperor ===
To avenge the fall of his native state, Zhang Liang dedicated his efforts to hiring assassins to kill the First Emperor of Qin. He spent his entire family fortune and failed to give his deceased younger brother a proper funeral. He managed to recruit a strongman with great physical strength, and had an iron hammer weighing 120 catties (roughly 160 lb or 73 kg) forged as the assassination weapon.

In 218 BC, Zhang Liang heard that the Emperor was going to Yangwu County (east of present-day Yuanyang County, Henan) as part of his inspection tour, and was due to pass by a local place called Bolangsha (博浪沙). Zhang Liang and the strongman lay in ambush at Bolangsha and waited for the Emperor's convoy to approach. They saw that all the carriages that passed by were pulled by four horses and believed that the most decorated one in the middle was the emperor's personal carriage. The strongman then hurled the heavy hammer towards it, and the projectile hit and crushed the carriage, killing its occupants. Zhang Liang fled from the scene during the ensuing chaos. However, the Emperor was actually in the neighboring carriage and survived the assassination attempt, after which he ordered a massive manhunt for Zhang Liang, who eluded the dragnet for ten days by using fake identities.

=== Meeting Huang Shigong ===
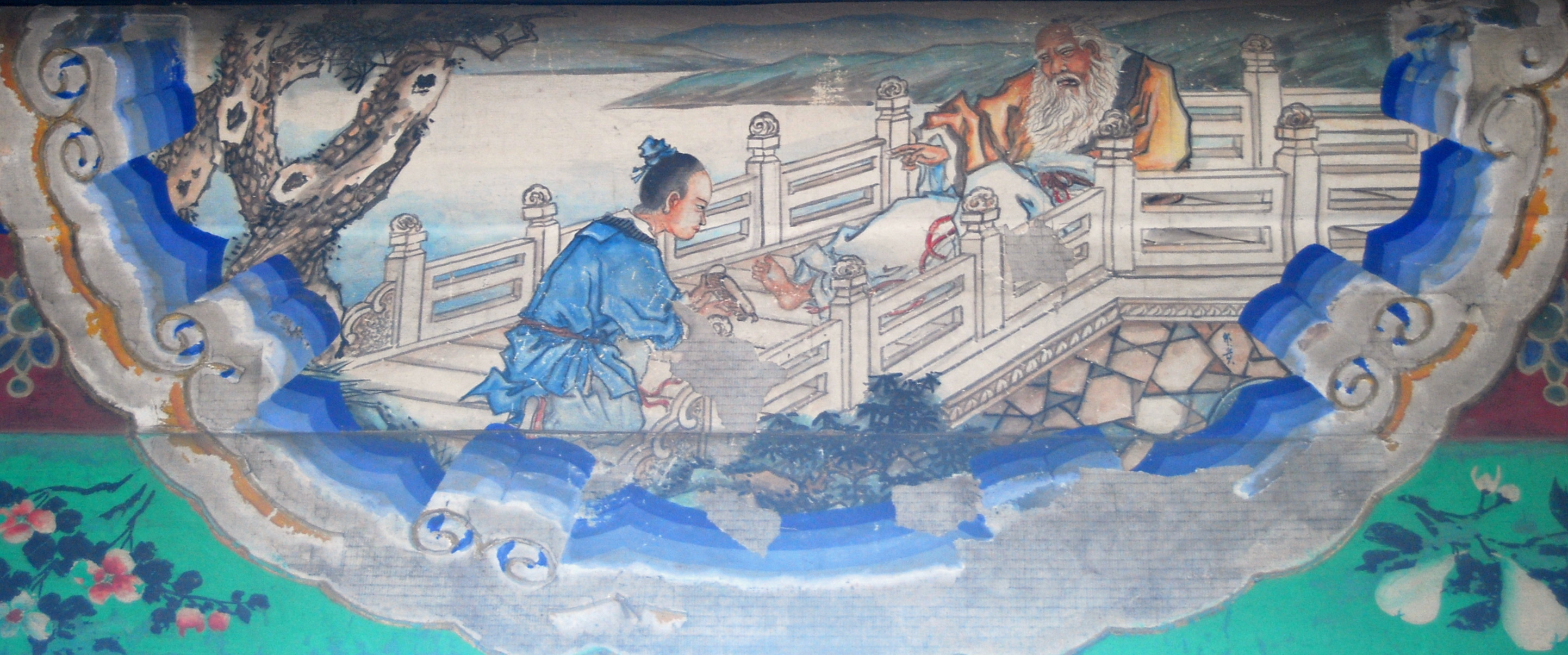
An illustration of Zhang Liang putting Huang Shigong's shoe back on at the Long Corridor of the Summer Palace, Beijing.

As a wanted fugitive by the Qin government, Zhang Liang fled to Xiapi and stayed there for some time, using fake identities to evade the authorities. One day, Zhang Liang took a stroll at Yishui Bridge and met an old man there. The man walked towards Zhang Liang and chucked his shoe down the bridge on purpose, after which he yelled at Zhang, "Hey boy, go down and fetch me my shoe!" Zhang Liang was astonished and offended, but obeyed silently out of courtesy. The old man then lifted his foot and ordered Zhang Liang to put on the shoe for him. Zhang Liang was furious but he controlled his temper and meekly obliged. The man did not show any sign of gratitude and walked away laughing.

As Zhang was brooding over the insult, the old man came back after walking a short distance and praised him, "This child can be taught!" He then told Zhang Liang to meet him at dawn at the bridge again in five days. Zhang Liang was confused but agreed. Five days later, Zhang Liang rushed to the bridge at the stroke of dawn but the old man was already waiting for him there. The old man chided him, "How can you be late for a meeting with an elderly man? Come back again five days later!" Zhang Liang tried his best to be punctual the second time but the old man still arrived earlier than him, and he was scorned once more and told to return again five days later. The third time, Zhang Liang went to the bridge at midnight and waited until the old man appeared. This time, the old man was impressed with Zhang Liang's fortitude and humility, that he presented Zhang with a book, saying, "You can become the tutor of a ruler after reading this book. Within ten years, the world will become chaotic. You can then use your knowledge from this book to bring peace and prosperity to the empire. Meet me again 13 years later. I'm the yellow rock at the foot of Mount Gucheng."

The old man was Huang Shigong (黃石公; lit. "Yellow Rock Old Man") . The book was titled The Art of War by Taigong (太公兵法) and believed to be the Six Secret Teachings by Jiang Ziya, while some called it Three Strategies of Huang Shigong. In legend, Zhang Liang returned to the indicated site 13 years later and did see a yellow rock there. He built a shrine to worship the rock, and had the rock buried with him after his death.

It is also said that Huang Shigong wrote the Lingqijing divination manual which was also given to Zhang Liang.

== Rebelling against the Qin dynasty ==
In 209 BC, during the reign of Qin Er Shi, several uprisings erupted throughout China to overthrow the Qin dynasty. Many of these rebel forces claimed to be restoring the former states that were annexed by Qin two decades ago. Zhang Liang rallied about 100 men to start a rebellion as well, but his force was too weak, so he led his followers to join Jing Ju, a pretender to the throne of the former Chu state. He met Liu Bang during his journey and was impressed with Liu's charisma that he changed his decision and joined Liu instead. Zhang Liang became a temporary advisor to Liu Bang and followed Liu to join Xiang Liang's rebel force.

The following year, Xiang Liang installed Mi Xin as King Huai II of Chu after eliminating Jing Ju. Zhang Liang's main goal was to reestablish his native state of Hán, so he managed to persuade Xiang Liang to do the same for the Hán state. Han Cheng, a descendant of the royal family of Hán, was enthroned as King of Hán, while Zhang Liang was appointed as the Hán's chancellor. Han Cheng's armies attempted to capture Qin cities that were formerly Hán territories but did not achieve much success and engaged in guerrilla warfare for about a year. Later that year, Xiang Liang was killed in action at the Battle of Dingtao and King Huai II put Xiang Yu (Xiang Liang's nephew) and Liu Bang each in charge of an army to attack Qin, promising that whoever entered Guanzhong (heartland of Qin) first would be conferred the title of "King of Guanzhong".

In 207 BC, the combined forces of Liu Bang and Han Cheng conquered Yangzhai (present-day Yuzhou City, Henan), the former capital of the Hán state. Han Cheng stayed behind to defend Yangzhai, while Zhang Liang served as a temporary advisor to Liu Bang. Zhang Liang contributed to Liu Bang's eventual victory in the race to Guanzhong for the strategies he proposed. For example, at the battle of Yao Pass, Zhang Liang suggested tricking the Qin commander into surrendering by bribing him with gifts. Liu Bang wanted to accept the surrendered Qin troops into his army but Zhang Liang cautioned him, saying that some of the troops were unwilling to surrender even though their commander agreed. That night, Liu Bang's forces caught the Qin army off guard and scored a major victory. In another incident, Zhang Liang warned Liu Bang against making a detour at Wancheng, because they would be at risk of being surrounded by the enemy if Liu did so.

== Chu–Han Contention ==
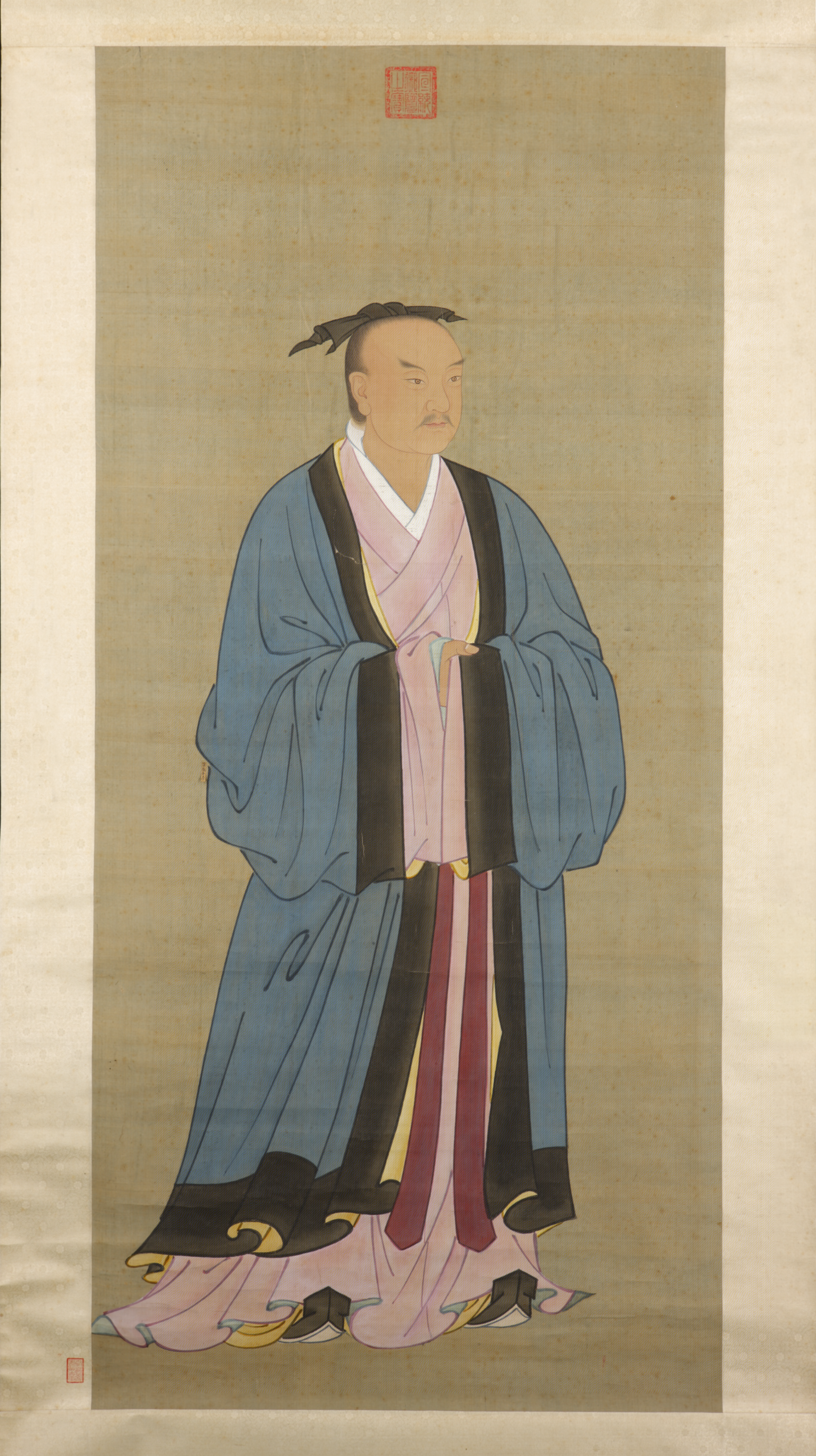
Ming dynasty portrait of Zhang Liang, housed in the Palace Museum.

=== Feast at Hong Gate ===
Upon entering the Epang Palace in Xianyang (the Qin capital), Liu Bang was strongly tempted by the riches it housed and wanted to stay there forever. Zhang Liang reminded Liu Bang about overindulgence in sensual pleasures and Liu ordered his men to seal the treasures and move to Bashang to wait for Xiang Yu and the other rebel forces to arrive. During this period of time, Liu Bang heeded Zhang Liang's advice and governed Guanzhong with benevolence, restoring peace and stability, and forbidding his men from pillaging the cities and harming the common people.

In 206 BC, Xiang Yu's army arrived at Hangu Pass (eastern gateway to Guanzhong) and Liu ordered his men to prevent Xiang's forces from entering Guanzhong. Xiang Yu was furious when he learnt that Liu Bang had beat him in the race to Guanzhong, and he wanted to kill Liu after being instigated by Fan Zeng and a defector from Liu's side, Cao Wushang. Xiang Yu's uncle, Xiang Bo, was an old friend of Zhang Liang and he secretly warned Zhang that Xiang Yu was planning to attack Liu Bang. Liu Bang was shocked and fearful when he heard that, as his forces were too weak to counter Xiang Yu. Zhang Liang advised Liu Bang to attend the Feast at Hong Gate hosted by Xiang Yu, to put Xiang off guard and dismiss Xiang's suspicions that Liu was intending to oppose him. With help from Xiang Bo, Liu Bang managed to survive the dangerous banquet and Xiang Yu dismissed the idea of killing Liu. However, Fan Zeng was dissatisfied and he asked Xiang Yu's cousin Xiang Zhuang to pretend to perform a sword dance and use the opportunity to kill Liu Bang. Xiang Bo intervened again and saved Liu Bang's life.

Meanwhile, Zhang Liang left the tent to find Fan Kuai to save Liu Bang. Following Zhang Liang's instructions, Fan Kuai burst in and openly chided Xiang Yu, making a speech about Liu Bang's accomplishments and affirming that Liu had no intention of opposing Xiang Yu. Liu Bang left the banquet later on the pretext of going to the latrine and was received by Xiahou Ying, who had been waiting nearby on Zhang Liang's instruction. Zhang Liang remained behind to hold Xiang Yu's attention while Liu Bang escaped. Before leaving, Zhang Liang presented Xiang Yu and Fan Zeng with a pair of jade pieces.

=== Eighteen Kingdoms ===
Xiang Yu split the former Qin Empire into the Eighteen Kingdoms later, granting the land of Guanzhong to three surrendered Qin generals, even though Guanzhong was rightfully Liu Bang's, according to King Huai II's earlier promise. Liu Bang was relocated to the remote Bashu region (in present-day Sichuan) instead and granted the title of "King of Han". Han Cheng retained his rulership as King of Hán and Zhang Liang was moved from Liu Bang's side back to Hán to continue serving as chancellor. Before parting ways, Liu Bang presented Zhang Liang with some gold and pearls, all of which Zhang gave to Xiang Bo. Zhang Liang also urged Liu Bang to destroy the gallery roads leading to Bashu during the journey to Hanzhong, in order to reduce Xiang Yu's suspicions that Liu was planning to return and challenge him.

Although Han Cheng was the king of Hán, Xiang Yu did not permit him to govern his kingdom and forced him to accompany him back to his Western Chu's capital of Pengcheng (present-day Xuzhou, Jiangsu). Han Cheng was demoted to "Marquis of Rang" later and killed on Xiang Yu's orders. Xiang Yu seized Han Cheng's kingdom and made his subordinate Zheng Chang the new King of Hán. Zhang Liang was still the chancellor of Hán under the new arrangement but he was aware of his precarious position, and cognisant of how Xiang Yu had destroyed his hope of restoring the Hán state. Zhang Liang fled from Hán later and returned to join Liu Bang in the winter of 206 BC. Liu Bang conferred on Zhang Liang the title of "Marquis of Chengxin" and Zhang became a permanent advisor to Liu from that time.

=== Conquest of the Three Qin and Battle of Pengcheng ===
Starting in 206 BC, after Liu Bang's forces conquered the Three Qins, Liu Bang and Xiang Yu engaged in a four-year-long power struggle for supremacy over China, historically known as the Chu–Han Contention. In 205 BC, Liu Bang was defeated by Xiang Yu at the Battle of Pengcheng and he retreated to Xiayi. Zhang Liang proposed a strategy to Liu Bang to counter Xiang Yu, known as the "Xiayi Plan" (下邑之謀). Liu Bang followed Zhang Liang's advice: he sent Xiao He to persuade Ying Bu to join him; contacted Peng Yue and allied with him; and allowed Han Xin to lead part of his army to attack other territories on the northern front.

In 204 BC, Liu Bang was trapped by Xiang Yu in Xingyang and both sides reached a stalemate. Li Yiji suggested to Liu Bang to recreate the former states of the Warring States period and install the descendants of their royal families on their respective thrones. This plan was intended to help Liu Bang gain the support of the vassal states' rulers, who would help him in the war against Xiang Yu. However, Zhang Liang disapproved of the plan as he felt that the states were more likely to support Western Chu instead as Chu was superior to Han in terms of military might. Liu Bang realised the problem and immediately dismissed Li Yiji's plan.

In 203 BC, after his victory at the Battle of Wei River, Han Xin conquered the Qi kingdom and sent a messenger to Liu Bang, requesting that Liu appoint him as the acting King of Qi. Liu was still trapped at Xingyang then and he was furious after hearing the request because he was expecting Han Xin to come to his aid. Zhang Liang reminded Liu Bang that if he refused to approve Han Xin's request, Han might be discontented and declare independence from Liu, putting them in a dangerous situation. Liu Bang reluctantly agreed and sent Zhang Liang to pass the king's seal to Han Xin. Zhang Liang met Han Xin and succeeded in reaffirming Han's loyalty to Liu Bang.

=== Battle of Gaixia ===
By late 203 BC, Zhang Liang saw that the tide had turned in favour of Liu Bang, as Xiang Yu had been surrounded on three sides. Together with Chen Ping, Zhang Liang suggested to Liu Bang to renounce the Treaty of Hong Canal and use the opportunity to eliminate Western Chu. However, at the Battle of Guling, Liu Bang was defeated by Xiang Yu because the expected reinforcements from Han Xin and Peng Yue did not arrive. Zhang Liang explained to Liu Bang that Han Xin and Peng Yue did not mobilise their troops because they did not have their fiefs yet, even though they had received their titles of vassal kings. Liu Bang followed Zhang Liang's advice and granted lands to Han Xin and Peng Yue. Two months later, as Zhang Liang predicted, Han Xin and Peng Yue arrived with their armies and formed a coordinated attack on Western Chu together with Liu Bang's force, defeating Xiang Yu at the Battle of Gaixia in 202 BC.

== Service during the Han dynasty ==
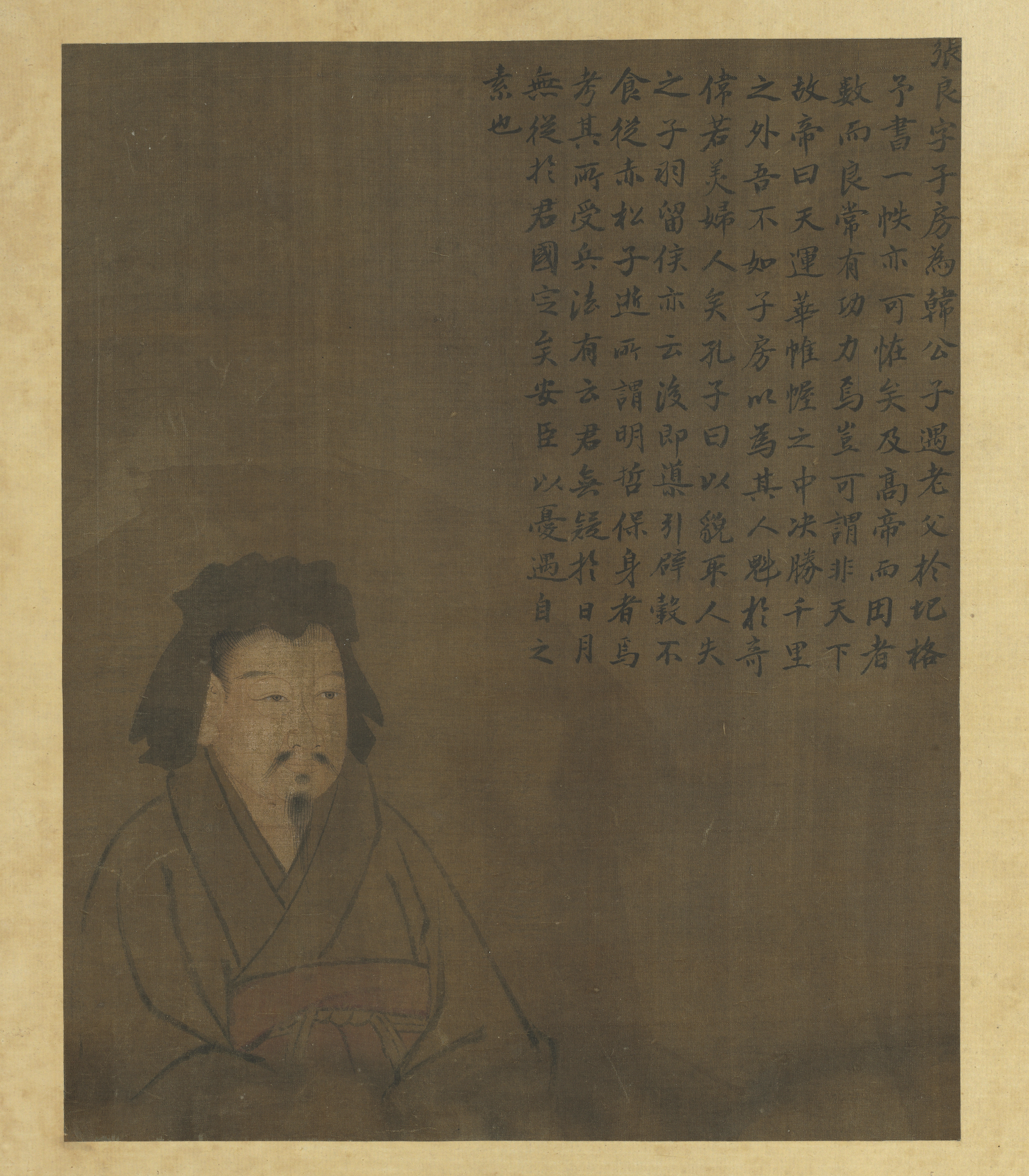
Portrait of Zhang Liang (National Palace Museum)

After his victory over Xiang Yu, Liu Bang ascended the imperial throne and proclaimed the establishment of the Han dynasty in 202 BC, becoming posthumously known as Emperor Gao(zu) ("Great (Ancestor)") of Han. Zhang Liang remained as a key advisor to Gaozu even though he did not receive any formal appointment as a government minister. In response to a proposal by Lou Jing, Zhang Liang concurred that Gaozu would be more secure building his capital at Chang'an instead of remaining in Luoyang, the Guanzhong Region being filled with fertile land and surrounded by natural defenses such as mountain passes. Once, Gaozu noticed that some of his subjects were having a secret discussion and he asked for Zhang Liang's opinion. Zhang Liang told Gaozu that they were plotting a rebellion and Gaozu was shocked. Zhang Liang proceeded to ask Gaozu whom of all his subjects he hated the most. Gaozu mentioned Yong Chi, who had rebelled against him before but surrendered later. Zhang Liang then suggested to Gaozu to grant Yong Chi a noble title, because if the others saw that Gaozu was able to forgive Yong Chi, they would be at ease and would not think of rebelling.

Subsequently, Zhang Liang retired from state affairs and practised Taoism. In late 201 BC, Gaozu rewarded his subjects who contributed to the dynasty's founding and he conferred the title of "Marquis of Liu" on Zhang Liang. In 196 BC, Gaozu left to suppress a rebellion by Ying Bu, and requested Zhang Liang to come out of retirement to assist the crown prince, Liu Ying, in governing the home territories. After returning from the campaign, Gaozu wanted to replace Liu Ying with Liu Ruyi, the Prince of Zhao and son of Lady Qi. Zhang Liang opposed Gaozu's decision but Gaozu ignored him so Zhang feigned illness and retired again. When approached by Empress Lü Zhi to help Liu Ying retain his position, Zhang Liang recommended the Four Whiteheads of Mount Shang to help Liu Ying, and the four men succeeded in convincing Gaozu to keep Liu Ying as the crown prince. (Note: In his Zizhi Tongjian Kaoyi, Sima Guang was skeptical of this account. He opinioned that given Liu Bang's tenacious personality, he would not easily change his mind due to criticism from others; the main reason why Liu Bang did not make Liu Ruyi taizi was that Liu Bang feared that after his death, Ruyi would not be able to receive support from court officials. If Liu Bang really wanted to make Ruyi taizi, as someone who had been close to Liu Bang for many years, Zhang Liang was right in his observation that it would take more than a few words to change Liu Bang's mind; so, how can a few words from four old men of the woods convince Liu Bang? If the "Four Whiteheads" could affect the succession, Liu Bang would have killed them, and not lament to Lady Qi. Also, even if the "Four Whiteheads" did convince Liu Bang to alter the succession, it would be an example of Zhang Liang providing assistance to Liu Ruyi against the latter's father, which is something Zhang would not have done. Thus, Sima did not include the account of the "Four Whiteheads" in Zizhi Tongjian, just like he did not include the account of Qin not attacking the Hangu Pass for 15 years after Su Qin had canvassed the other Six States, and the account of the Qin army retreating for 50 li after Lu Zhonglian persuaded Xinyuan Yan. Sima Guang also criticized Sima Qian for including these three accounts in his Shiji due to the latter's propensity in believing incredible accounts.) Zhang Liang remained in retirement until his death in 189 BC.

== Death and burial place ==
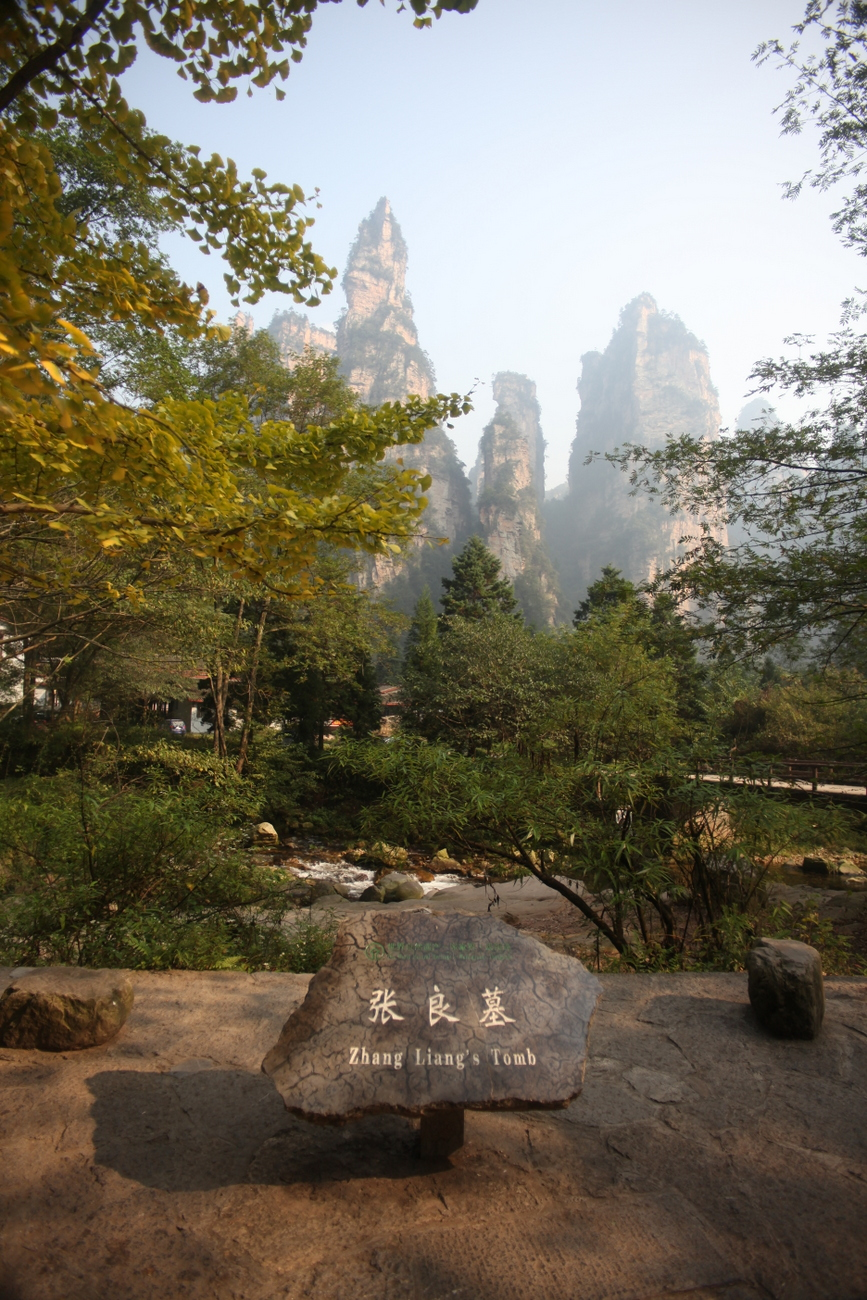
The Zhang Liang Tomb in Zhangjiajie, Hunan.

Little is known about Zhang Liang's later life; hence, his final resting place has been a mystery throughout history.

A Zhang Liang Tomb stands at 6 km southwest of present-day Lankao County, Henan. According to legend, during the Lü Clan Disturbance, Zhang Liang moved to Mount Baiyun at the southwest of Donghun County (present-day Lankao County, Henan), and was buried there after his death. A Zhang Liang Temple used to stand beside the tomb, but it was destroyed during the Cultural Revolution.

Another Zhang Liang Tomb stands south of Weishan County, Shandong. The stone tablet in front of the grave bearing Zhang Liang's name was erected in 1737 during the Qing dynasty. A Zhang Liang Shrine also used to stand east of the tomb, but it was destroyed during the Cultural Revolution.

However, some believed that Zhang Liang's tomb was in present-day Pei County, Xuzhou. According to the 7th-century gazetteer Kuodi Zhi, Zhang Liang's tomb was 65 li east of Pei County, near Liucheng, where a Zhang Liang Temple was also located.

According to Xianshizhi (仙釋志) and Lingmuzhi (陵墓志), Zhang Liang's tomb was at Mount Qingyan in Hunan.

== Zhang Liang and Taoism ==
According to the Collection of Lost Records of Immortals (仙传拾遗), after Zhang Liang helped Liu Bang establish the Han dynasty, he practiced self-cultivation using the book given to him by Huang Shigong. He refined his qi, stopped eating, and his body became light, ultimately ascending to heaven and becoming the Taixuan Tongzi. He often followed the Taishang Laojun in the Taiqing realm. His eighth-generation grandson, Zhang Daoling, also achieved the status of a Taoist immortal.

According to the Chao County Chronicle (巢县志), there is a Zifang Cave on Baiyun Mountain in Chao County. It is said to be the place where Zhang Liang went into seclusion, practicing fasting and meditation. Later generations built a temple there, offering incense to him every year.

The Tianshou Temple in Chen County (now southeast of Kaifeng, Henan Province) is another place where Zhang Liang is worshipped. During the Song dynasty, in the Zhenghe period (1111–1118), he was granted the title of "Lingxu Zhenren".

== Story in Journey to the West ==
In the 16th-century Chinese novel Journey to the West, there is a mention of his encounter with Huang Shigong. When Sun Wukong found himself in a heated argument with his master, Tang Sanzang, he decided to part ways and soar through the realms. Upon reaching the East Sea, he received an invitation from the Dragon King of the East Sea. Inside the palace, a painting titled "Three Entrances to the Bridge" caught his eye. He inquired about its meaning, prompting the Dragon King to tell a tale.

The Dragon King recounted, "At the end of the Qin dynasty, Zhang Liang encountered Huang Shigong on a bridge. To gauge his potential, Huang Shigong deliberately knocked off his shoe three times, each time falling beneath the bridge, testing Zhang Liang's patience. Though tempted to anger, Zhang Liang maintained respect for the elder. Impressed by his diligence, Huang Shigong secretly imparted a heavenly book to him under the cover of night. This knowledge later enabled Zhang Liang to assist Liu Bang in establishing the Han dynasty. After achieving peace, Zhang Liang relinquished his position, retreated to the mountains, embraced the Daoist path, and ultimately attained immortality."

Concluding the tale, the Dragon King advised Sun Wukong, stating, "The Great Sage, if you do not protect Tang Sanzang and heed his guidance, you will not attain enlightenment and will remain merely a demon. Return to your master." Moved by the story, Sun Wukong returned to Tang Sanzang's side.

== Modern references ==
Zhang Liang's encounter with Huang Shigong had also become one of the classic Chinese folk tales about humility for later generations to learn from.

Zhang Liang is one of the 32 historical figures who appear as special characters in the video game Romance of the Three Kingdoms XI by Koei. He has higher intelligence stats than all these characters, except for Jiang Ziya. Zhang Liang is also a playable character of the "Wizard" class in the action RPG Prince of Qin.

Zhang Liang has been portrayed in various media set in the Chu–Han Contention, such as The Great Conqueror's Concubine, and The Last Supper, and Han's third assassination attempt before Qin Shi Huang became the Emperor in The Mummy: Tomb of the Dragon Emperor. He appears in the 2012 television series King's War. He also appears as a character in the animation series The Legend of Qin.
