= The Last Supper (2012 film) =

2012 Chinese-Hong Kong-Taiwanese film by Lu Chuan

- Poster
- 王的盛宴
- Directed by: Lu Chuan
- Written by: Lu Chuan
- Produced by: Lu Chuan; Qin Hong; Albert Yeung; Yang Teng-kuei; Zhao Xiaowen; Alan Zhang; Gu Guoqing
- Starring: Liu Ye; Daniel Wu; Chang Chen; Qin Lan; Sha Yi; Nie Yuan; Huo Siyan
- Cinematography: Zhang Li; Ma Cheng
- Edited by: Liu Yijia; Cui Liang
- Music by: Liu Tong
- Production company: Beijing Chuan Films
- Distributed by: Wild Bunch (international)
- Release date: 29 November 2012
- Running time: 110 minutes
- Countries: China; Hong Kong; Taiwan
- Language: Mandarin

The Last Supper (王的盛宴) is a 2012 historical film directed by Lu Chuan. The plot is based on events in the Chu–Han Contention, an interregnum between the fall of the Qin dynasty and the founding of the Han dynasty in Chinese history. A Chinese-Hong Kong-Taiwanese co-production, the film was originally scheduled to be released on 5 July 2012, but was delayed. It premiered at the Toronto International Film Festival on 8 September 2012.

== Synopsis ==
The story is told in flashbacks from the point of view of a 61-year-old Liu Bang, the founding emperor of the Han dynasty. Liu Bang has been living in fear and apprehension as he constantly suspects that someone is trying to kill him. In his whole life, he has been afraid of only two persons: Xiang Yu, his rival in their power struggle for supremacy over China after the fall of the Qin dynasty; and Han Xin, a man who previously served Xiang Yu, but later became a general under him, and helped him defeat Xiang Yu. Liu Bang then reflects on key events in his life, such as the Feast at Swan Goose Gate and the Battle of Gaixia.

Among all his subjects, Liu Bang regards Han Xin, Xiao He, and Zhang Liang as the three most important persons who assisted him in defeating Xiang Yu and establishing the Han dynasty. Yet, after becoming the emperor, he has started to suspect that Han Xin is plotting against him, so he has imprisoned Han Xin for the past six years. Later, he releases Han Xin and lets him stay in Zhang Liang's residence.

As Liu Bang becomes increasingly paranoid and suspicious of his subjects, Zhang Liang claims to be in poor health and retires to spend his time experimenting with elixirs. Xiao He, who is now the chancellor, is supervising the historians writing the history of the Han dynasty. Liu Bang's wife, Lü Zhi, ultimately threatens and coerces Zhang Liang and Xiao He into turning against Han Xin and writing in the historical record that Han Xin plotted a rebellion.

Xiao He reluctantly leads Han Xin to a banquet hosted by the empress which is actually a trap. Han Xin is arrested, accused of treason, and executed by strangulation, and his dead body is suspended. To prove his loyalty, Xiao He tearfully cuts off Han Xin's head and presents it to Liu Bang, just moments before the emperor dies. It is said that Liu Bang finally found peace in death because he has been living in suspense and fear throughout his life.

== Cast ==
- Liu Ye as Liu Bang
- Daniel Wu as Xiang Yu
- Chang Chen as Han Xin
- Qin Lan as Lü Zhi
- Sha Yi as Xiao He
- Nie Yuan as Xiang Zhuang
- Huo Siyan as Concubine Qi
- He Dujuan as Consort Yu
- Tao Zeru as Fan Zeng
- Li Qi as Xiang Bo
- Qi Dao as Zhang Liang
- Lü Yulai as Ziying
- Hao Bojie as Yu Ziqi
- Zhao Liang as Wu She
- Mohe Ta'er as Fan Kuai
- Zhao Xiang as Kuai Che
- Xiaotangyuan as Cao Wushang
- Qi Yixian as Xiahou Ying
- Liu Wei as Xiang Liang
- Dong Bo as Lü Matong

== Production ==
Shooting for The Last Supper started in March 2011 and ended on 1 November 2011. Locations include the Xiangshan Film City in Ningbo, and Kangxi Grassland in Beijing. The film is based on the latest archaeological data collected in recent years and aims to provide a new perspective on that part of history.

The film was originally titled 鸿门宴 (Feast at Swan Goose Gate) in Chinese, but was later changed to 王的盛宴 (The King's Supper) to avoid confusion with Daniel Lee's White Vengeance (Chinese title 鸿门宴), which is also based on events in the Chu–Han Contention.

In an interview with The Hollywood Reporter, when asked on how different The Last Supper would be as compared to other Chinese historical films, director Lu Chuan said, "I wish to present to audiences something believable. Many earlier Chinese historical films showcase gorgeous scenes and flamboyant costumes, but what actually occurred in history thousands of years ago was not like this. I want to show history in its true form, and things that really happened in the past." Lu also revealed that to paint a more accurate picture of history, he and his team had invested a lot of time and money. He had read many historical books and texts, and carefully designed the character models, costumes, props, etc.

=== Casting ===
Chow Yun-fat and Liu Ye were initially considered for the roles of Liu Bang and Xiang Yu respectively, but eventually the latter was cast as Liu Bang instead and Daniel Wu was chosen to play Xiang Yu.

Principal cast members Daniel Wu, Qin Lan and Liu Ye gained weight to prepare for their roles. Wu felt that he was too slim to portray the robustly built Xiang Yu, so he put on 10 kg by having seven meals a day. Qin increased her weight from 48 kg to 54 kg by consuming foods and drinks high in calories and fat in order to play a middle-aged Lü Zhi. Qin portrayed Lü Zhi again in King's War, a 2012 Chinese television series about the Chu–Han Contention.

Yang Mi had promised director Lu Chuan to join the cast but she dropped out due to conflicts in her schedule.
