= Feast at Swan Goose Gate =

206 BCE banquet marking a power struggle in ancient China

Hong Men Yan
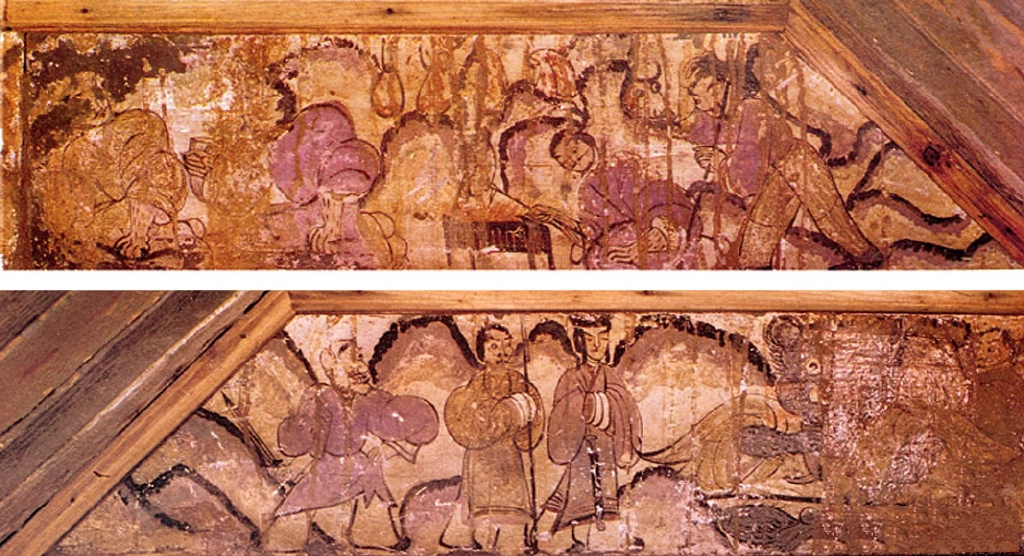
- Western Han dynasty mural depicting the feast, discovered in the Northwest 61st Tomb in the Luoyang Ancient Tombs Museum. One of the earliest excavated depictions of the event.
- Native name: 鴻門宴
- English name: Feast at Swan Goose Gate
- Date: 206 BCE
- Venue: Hongmen
- Location: Xinfeng, Xi'an, Shaanxi
- Type: feast
- Motive: to assassinate Liu Bang
- Target: Liu Bang
- Perpetrators: Fan Zeng; Xiang Zhuang
- Organised by: Xiang Yu
- Outcome: Liu Bang fled

Feast at Swan Goose Gate
- Traditional Chinese: 鴻門宴
- Simplified Chinese: 鸿门宴
Transcriptions
Standard Mandarin
- Hanyu Pinyin: Hóng Mén Yàn
Yue: Cantonese
- Jyutping: Hung4 Mun4 Jin3

The Feast at Swan Goose Gate, also known as the Banquet at Hongmen, Hongmen Banquet or Hongmen Feast, was a Chinese historical event that took place in 206 BCE at Swan Goose Gate (Chinese: 鴻門; pinyin: Hóng Mén) at Xinfeng, outside Xianyang, the former capital of the collapsed Qin dynasty. Its modern location is roughly at Hongmenbao Village, Xinfeng Town, Lintong District, Xi'an, Shaanxi province. The main parties involved were Xiang Yu and Liu Bang, two prominent Chu insurgency leaders who rebelled against the Qin dynasty from 209 to 206 BCE, with the former attempting unsuccessfully to assassinate the latter after inviting him to a banquet.

The Feast is often memorialised in Chinese history, literature, performance arts and popular culture, as it was a highlight of the personal grudges and power struggle between the aristocratic Xiang Yu and the grassroot Liu Bang, contrasting the former's arrogant, impulsive, militant personality with the latter's humble, calculative, diplomatic demeanour. It can be seen as the first conflict of the Chu–Han Contention, a violent civil war for supremacy over China that concluded with Xiang Yu's defeat and suicide at the Battle of Gaixia in 203 BC, followed by Liu Bang's ascension as the founding emperor of the prosperous Han dynasty.

== Background ==
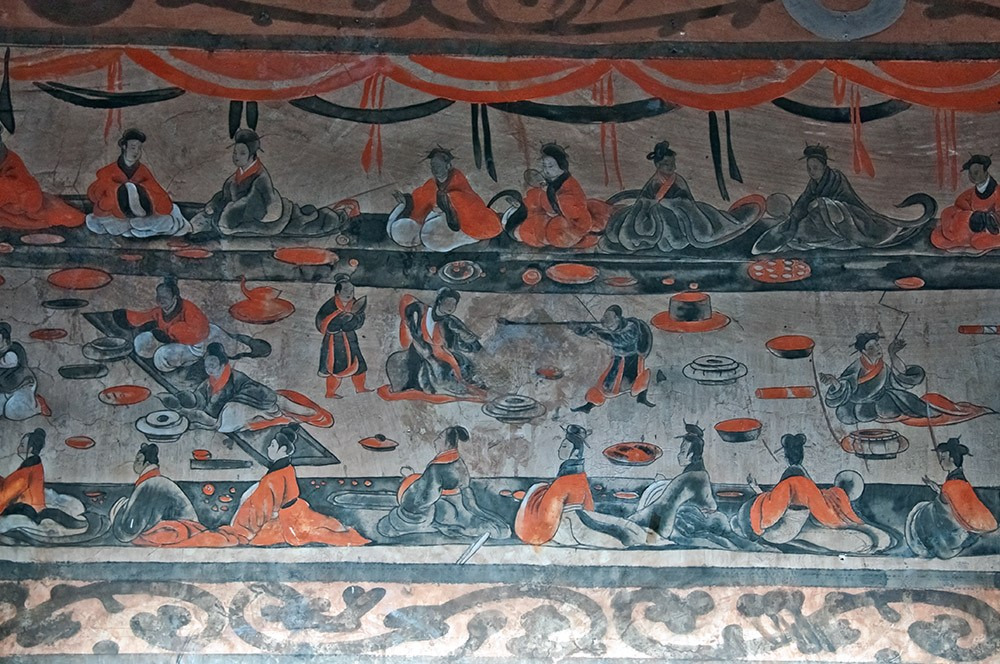
A late Eastern Han dynasty (25–220 CE) tomb mural showing lively scenes of a banquet, dance and music, acrobatics, and wrestling, from the Dahuting Tombs in Zhengzhou, Henan

After the untimely death of the First Emperor of Qin during his fifth imperial tour in 210 BCE, the ambitious chief eunuch Zhao Gao conspired with chancellor Li Si to install the incompetent Prince Huhai as the new emperor, during which they forced the suicide of then-heir apparent Prince Fusu and purged anyone deemed disobedient (nobilities and bureaucrats alike) in the Qin court. Due to the corrupt rule of Huhai and Zhao Gao, a massive uprising led by Chu-loyalists Chen Sheng and Wu Guang broke out in Dazexiang (modern day Yongqiao District, Suzhou, Anhui) in 209 BC, which lasted five months finally crushed by a hastily organized army of penal troopers led by Qin general Zhang Han.

Despite the failure of the Dazexiang uprising, numerous other anti-Qin rebellions subsequently erupted throughout China between 209 BCE and 206 BCE. Many of these insurgent forces were led by aristocrat clans of the former six eastern states conquered by the Qin state during its wars of unification from 230 BCE to 221 BCE. Among them were Xiang Yu and Liu Bang, with the former being a young warrior from the aristocratic Xiang clan of the Chu state; while the latter a middle-aged commoner who formerly served as a retainer of Zhang Er and later entered the Qin bureaucracy as a rural sheriff of the Pei County.

In 208 BCE, Xiang Yu joined his uncle Xiang Liang's rebellion and installed King Huai II as the nominal ruler of the revived Chu state, while his uncle was the de facto supreme commander of the Chu army. Liu Bang, who started his own grassroot rebellion against the Qin dynasty in 209 BCE after failing an official duty to escort penal labourers during the chaos of the Dazexiang uprising, also decided to join Xiang Liang and became a sworn brother of Xiang Yu. But in late 208 BCE, Xiang Liang was defeated and killed in action by Zhang Han's forces at the Battle of Dingtao (in modern Dingtao, Heze, Shandong), so King Huai II seized back control of the Chu military when Xiang Yu was away sieging Chenliu (modern Kaifeng, Henan). After relocating his headquarters to Pengcheng (modern Xuzhou, Jiangsu), King Huai II ordered all his generals to fan out and attack Qin on multiple fronts, promising that the first person to successfully invaded Qin's Guanzhong heartland would rightfully claim it as fief.

Among the Chu commanders, Xiang Yu was assigned as a deputy general under Song Yi (who was appointed by King Huai II as the new Chu supreme commander in replacement of the late Xiang Liang) and was sent north to reinforce the ally Zhao state against Zhang Han's attacks. Xiang Yu, who wanted to invade west and loot Guanzhong out of revenge for his uncle, was very displeased over the decision to send him north. He soon mutinied against Song Yi, who refused to engage Zhang Han frontally and wanted to wait for the Zhao army to wear down the Qin forces, and killed Song under the accusation of treasonous cowardice. After the mutiny, Xiang Yu seized command and managed to led the outnumbered Chu army to surprise victory at the Battle of Julu in mid-207 BCE, which cemented his reputation as a formidable military hegemon among the rebels. After hearing the news that someone had already beaten him to the race of invading Guanzhong first, Xiang Yu (who desperately wanted to head west) committed the war crime of burying alive 200,000 surrendered Qin prisoners of war in November 207 BCE.

While Xiang Yu was busy fighting Zhang Han, Liu Bang, who was given command of an independent western detachment, conquered Wu Pass and became the first rebel to invade the Guanzhong region. He quickly overcame the remaining Qin defenders via clever use of diplomacy, bribery and surprise attacks, and by October 207 BCE, had overcome the last significant Qin resistance in Lantian to arrive at the outskirts of the capital Xianyang. The last Qin emperor, Ziying, surrendered to Liu Bang, marking the end of the Qin dynasty. After occupying Xianyang, Liu Bang gave strict disciplinary orders to his troops, forbidding them from looting and pillaging the city and harming the civilian populace. Liu Bang also sent troops to garrison at Hangu Pass to block Xiang Yu from entering Guanzhong. When Xiang Yu arrived, he was furious to hear that Liu Bang had already occupied Guanzhong, so he attacked and conquered the pass, pushing on to west of the Xi River (戲水; a tributary of the Wei River flowing through present-day Lintong District, Xi'an, Shaanxi). Liu Bang and his army were based in Bashang (灞上; also known as White Deer Plain (白鹿原); about 10 km or 6.2 mi southeast of present-day Xi'an, Shaanxi) then. The strengths of Xiang Yu (along with the allied Zhao, Wei, Qi, Yan, Dai forces) and Liu Bang's armies in the stand-off at the time were estimated to be 400,000 and 100,000 respectively.

== Prelude ==
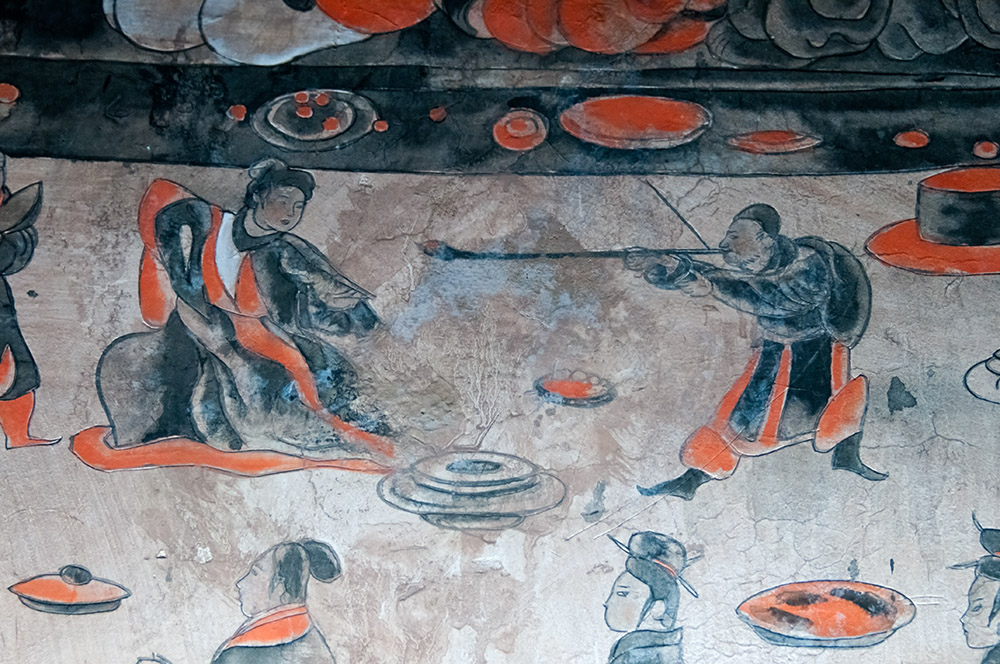
Detail of a larger mural, showing a musician and a dancer, from the Dahuting Tombs

Cao Wushang (曹無傷), a defector from Liu Bang's side, secretly sent a messenger to Xiang Yu to inform him that Liu Bang was planning to declare himself King of Guanzhong in accordance with King Huai II's earlier promise, while the surrendered Qin emperor Ziying would serve as Liu Bang's chancellor. Cao Wushang also added that Liu Bang had seized all the wealth of Xianyang for himself. Xiang Yu was furious hearing this and planned to attack Liu Bang. Xiang Yu's adviser, Fan Zeng, felt that Liu Bang's achievements as a grassroot rebel posed a future threat to his lord, so he also urged Xiang Yu to eliminate Liu Bang as soon as possible.

One of Xiang Yu's uncles, Xiang Bo, shared a close friendship with Liu Bang's adviser Zhang Liang. Xiang Bo feared for his friend's life so he sneaked to Liu Bang's camp to warn Zhang Liang about the peril he was in, telling Zhang Liang to flee. Liu Bang was shocked when Zhang Liang relayed the news to him, and he sought advice from Zhang Liang to resolve the crisis. Zhang Liang instructed Liu Bang to enlist the help of Xiang Bo to reduce Xiang Yu's suspicions. Liu Bang met Xiang Bo and treated him like an honoured guest, flattering Xiang Bo and pretending to arrange for a marriage between his son and Xiang Bo's daughter while asking Xiang Bo to help him speak to Xiang Yu. When Xiang Bo returned to Xiang Yu's camp later, he assured his nephew that Liu Bang had no ill intentions, and conveyed Liu Bang's message that he was willing to submit to Xiang Yu.

== Feast ==
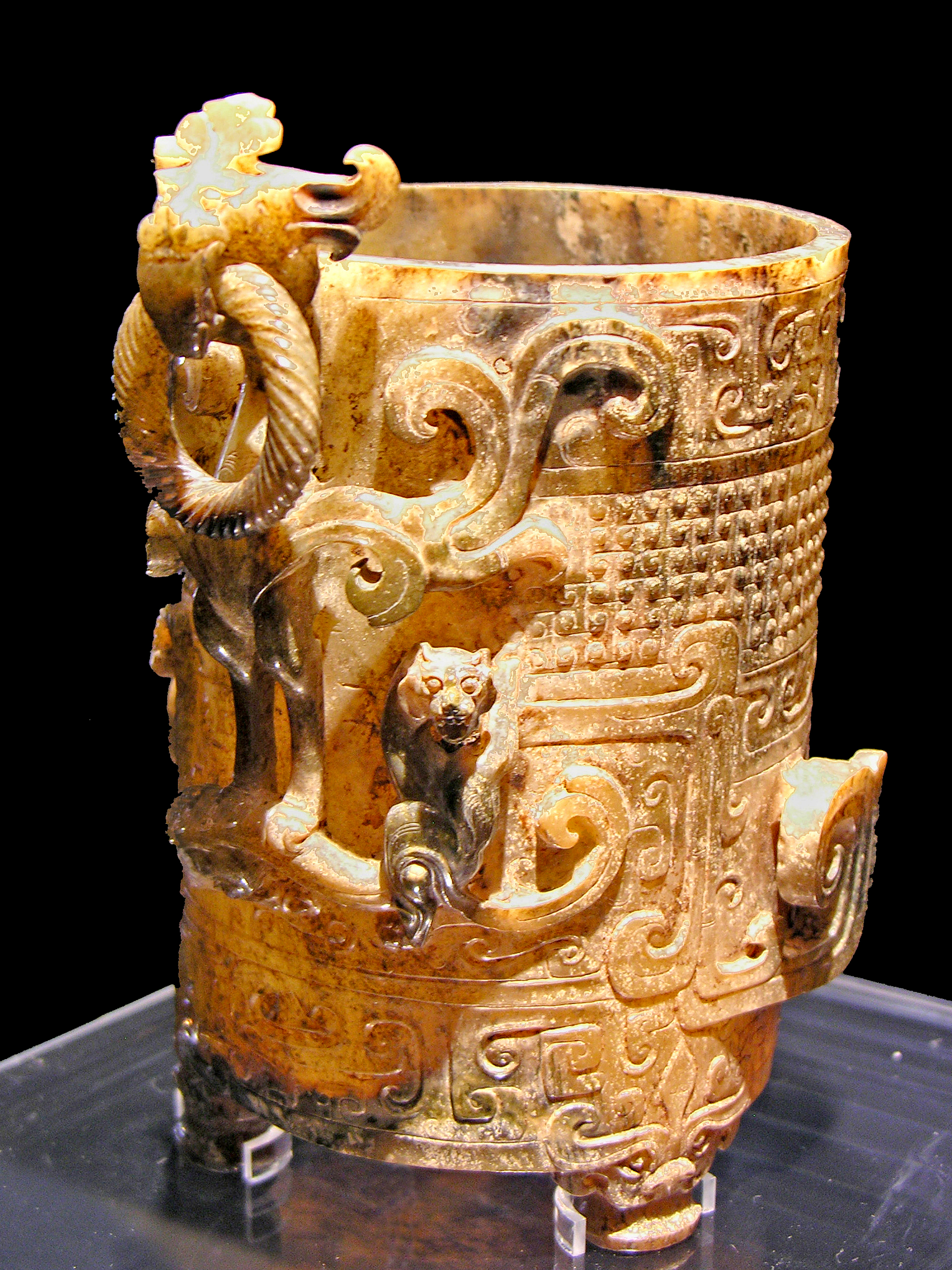
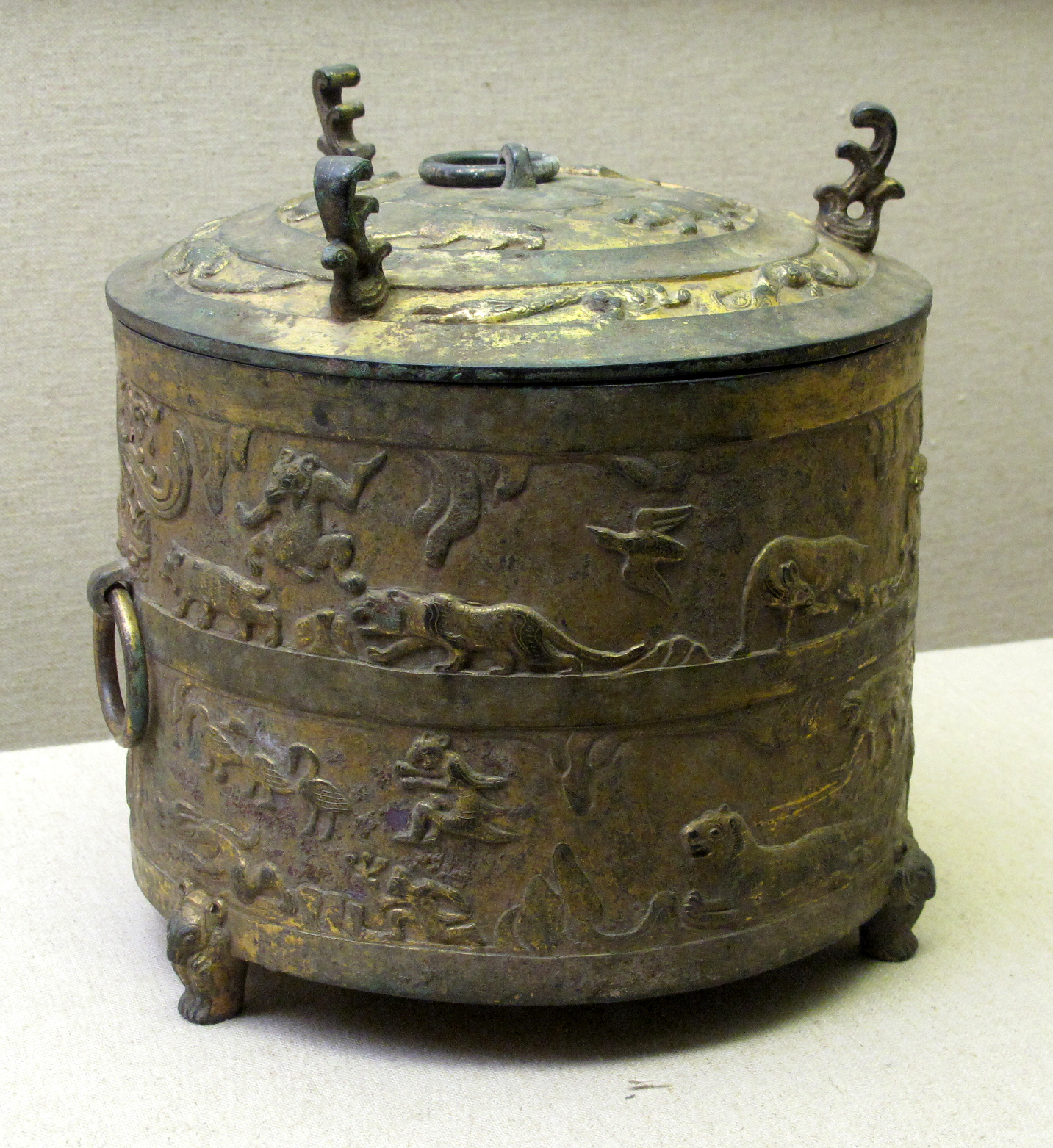
Left: A jade-carved wine cup with relief decorations, Western Han (202 BCE – 9 CE)
Right: a gilded bronze wine warmer with animalistic relief decorations, 26 BCE, Western Han period

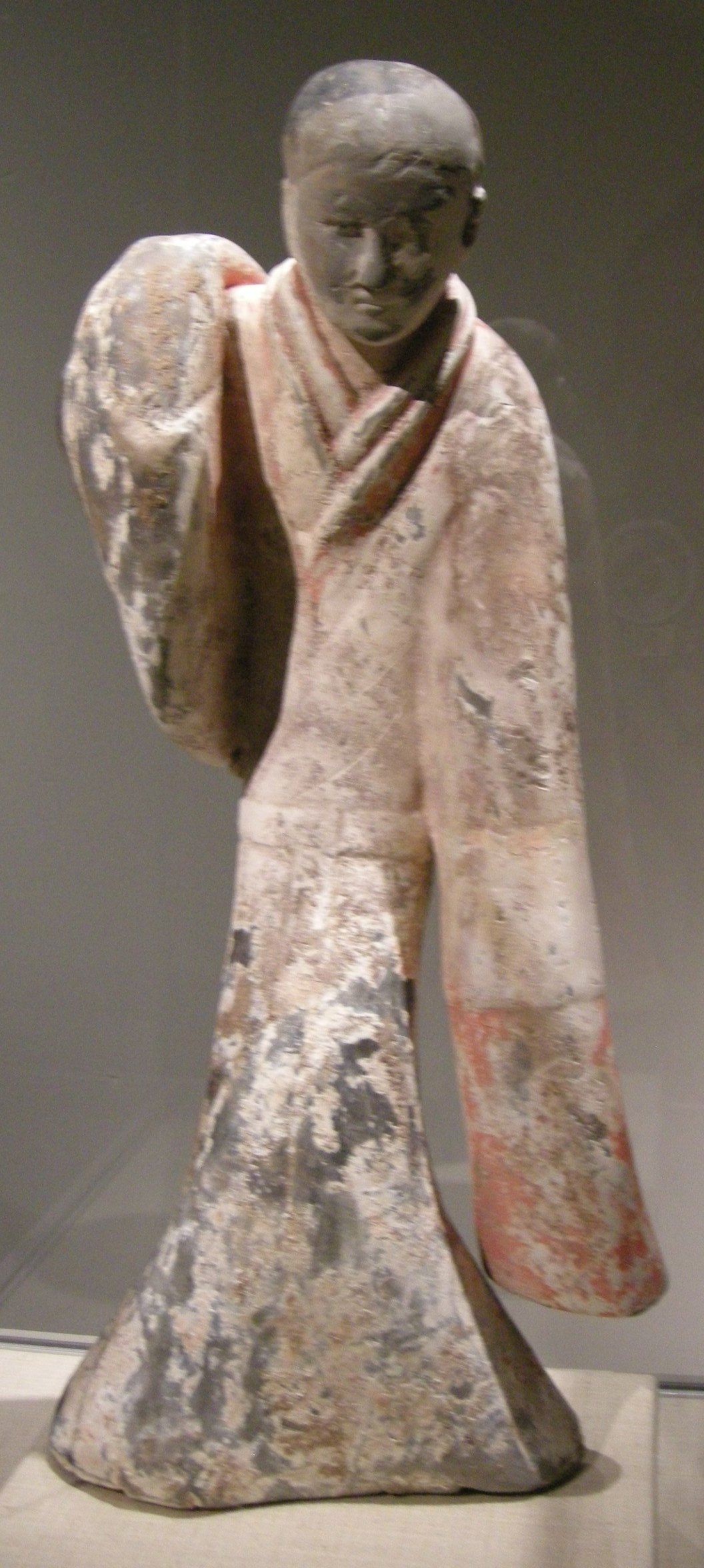
A Western Han female dancer in silk robes, 2nd century BCE, Metropolitan Museum of Art

The following day, Liu Bang brought about 100 men with him to meet Xiang Yu at Swan Goose Gate (鴻門), where Xiang Yu had prepared a banquet. Liu Bang explained that he had managed to enter Guanzhong first because of sheer luck, and apologised to Xiang Yu for robbing him of his glory while extolling Xiang Yu's valour in battle. Liu Bang also explained that the misunderstanding was caused by vile words from someone plotting to sow discord between him and Xiang Yu. Xiang Yu then pointed out that it was Cao Wushang who told him about Liu Bang's supposed intentions. He invited Liu Bang to partake in the banquet.

The main parties involved in the feast were seated in the following arrangement: Xiang Yu and Xiang Bo faced east; Fan Zeng faced south; Liu Bang faced north; Zhang Liang faced west. According to custom, the east-facing seat was the most respectable place, usually reserved for the guest, while the south-facing seat was reserved for the lord or host, while his subjects would face north. The seating arrangement indicated that Xiang Yu merely treated Liu Bang as a subject, while Liu Bang, in taking the north-facing seat, had shown that he was willing to submit to Xiang Yu.

During the banquet, Fan Zeng made signals and hinted many times to Xiang Yu to kill Liu Bang, but Xiang Yu ignored him. Fan Zeng then summoned Xiang Yu's cousin Xiang Zhuang, instructing him to pretend to perform a sword dance to entertain the guests and find an opportunity to assassinate Liu Bang. Xiang Zhuang started dancing after Xiang Yu approved, but Xiang Bo offered to join the performance and he blocked Xiang Zhuang with his body whenever the latter thrust his sword towards Liu Bang.

In the meantime, Zhang Liang left the feast and went outside to summon Fan Kuai, Liu Bang's brother-in-law by affinity, and returned to his seat after giving some instructions. Fan Kuai then burst into the banquet area uninvited, dressed in full armour and armed with his sword and shield, interrupting the sword dance and glaring at Xiang Yu. Xiang Yu was initially startled by Fan Kuai's party-crashing, but soon became impressed by his bravado and asked for his name, calling him a "brave warrior". Xiang Yu then ordered his men to serve wine to Fan Kuai, who gulped it down, and then offered Fan Kuai a cut of meat (a pork shoulder), who placed the meat on his shield and used his sword to cut off chunks and eat. Xiang Yu was even more impressed and asked Fan Kuai if he wanted more wine, but Fan Kuai confronted him with a lengthy speech about Liu Bang's virtues and accomplishments, stating how it would be unjust for Xiang Yu to try kill Liu Bang, but also implicitly affirming that his lord would not challenge Xiang Yu's authority.

"I do not fear death. A cup of wine is sufficient for me. The King of Qin had a heart like that of a tiger and a wolf—he killed countless people and meted out all sorts of tortures. This caused everyone to rebel against him. King Huai previously made an agreement with all the generals that whoever conquered Qin and entered Xianyang first would be king. Now that the Duke of Pei (Liu Bang) had subjugated Qin and occupied Xianyang, he did not harm the people, but instead sealed the palace and moved his army to Bashang to await your arrival. The reason why he sent troops to guard the passes is because bandits are rampant around this area. Such is the hard work he has done, but he has yet to receive any reward. Now, after listening to rumours, when you intend to kill someone who has made such achievements, you are actually taking the same path that led to the downfall of Qin."

— Fan Kuai

Xiang Yu did not respond to the accusation, but instead invited Fan Kuai to join the banquet.

=== Liu Bang's escape ===
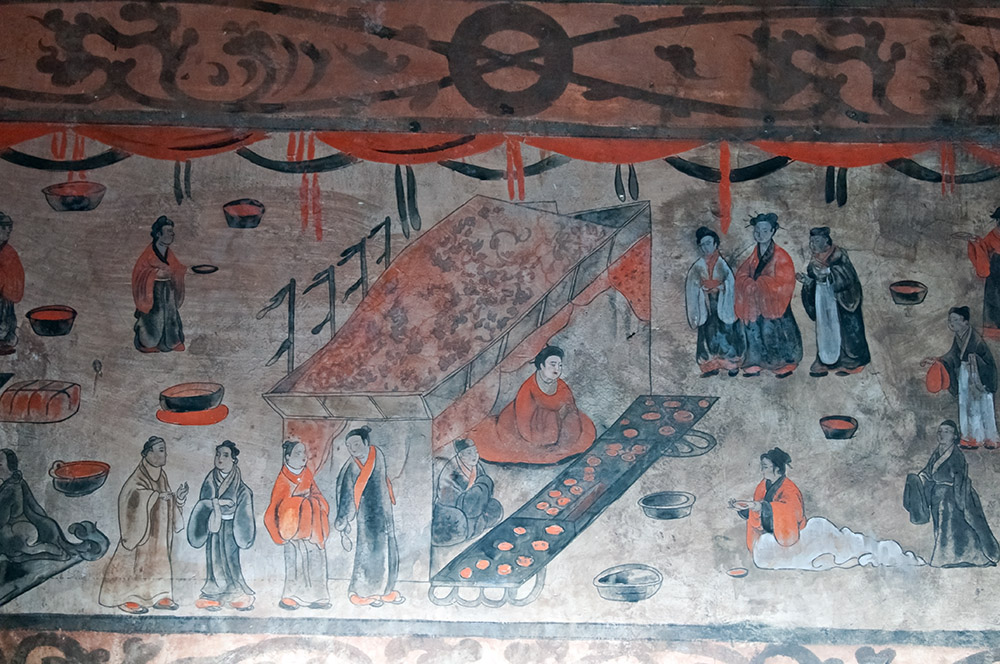
Banquet scene from a mural of the Dahuting Tombs

Later in the feast, Liu Bang excused himself that he needed to use the latrine, so he left the banquet with Fan Kuai. Shortly after, Xiang Yu sent Chen Ping to call Liu Bang back to the feast. Liu Bang felt that he should still bid Xiang Yu farewell out of courtesy, but Fan Kuai opposed his decision and suggested they should leave before it was too late.

"They are the cleaver and chopping board, and we are the fish and meat."

— Fan Kuai

Fan Kuai was essentially reminding Liu Bang that their lives were still at Xiang Yu's mercy and they should escape as soon as they had a chance. He then chose a horse for Liu Bang to ride, and Liu escaped with Fan Kuai, Xiahou Ying, Jin Jiang (靳疆) and Ji Xin accompanying him on foot.

Before his escape, Liu Bang gave Zhang Liang a pair of jade tablets and a pair of jade measuring cups, telling him to present them as gifts to Xiang Yu and Fan Zeng respectively. Zhang Liang returned to his seat and presented the gifts while apologising on Liu Bang's behalf for leaving without bidding farewell, giving an excuse that Liu Bang was already too drunk to continue participating in the feast. Xiang Yu accepted the jade tablets but Fan Zeng threw the jade cups to the ground and hacked them to pieces with his sword, predicting that Liu Bang would take away the empire from Xiang Yu one day.

"Alas! This brat is not worthy enough to make plans with me. The Duke of Pei (Liu Bang) will definitely be the one who seizes the empire away from King Xiang (Xiang Yu). We will all become his (Liu Bang's) prisoners."

— Fan Zeng

After returning to his camp, Liu Bang had Cao Wushang executed for his treachery.

== Aftermath ==
After Liu Bang's submission and withdrawal from Xianyang, Xiangyu proceeded to enter and sack the capital, burning the Epang Palace and also having Ziying and the surrendered Qin royal family all summarily executed. He then carved up the Qin Empire into Eighteen Kingdoms, each ruled by a warlord of his choosing, and titled himself the Hegemon-King of Western Chu who held suzerain supremacy over all other kingdoms. The Guanzhong region was given to three surrendered Qin generals universally despised as traitors by the Qin people, namely Zhang Han, Sima Xin and Dong Yi, whose fief kingdoms of Yong, Sai and Di were collectively known as the Three Qins.

Liu Bang was forced to accept the enfeoffment of the remote and impoverished Bashu region (present-day Sichuan Basin), which was then an underdeveloped region mainly used as penal colonies for exiled criminals. After lobbying by Zhang Liang, who was a Hán aristocrat widely respected for previously attempting to ambush and assassinate the First Emperor of Qin in 218 BC, Xiang Yu reluctantly added the better developed Hanzhong Basin to Liu Bang's fiefs, arguing that it now fulfilled the promise of "King of Guanzhong" as Hanzhong was connected to the Guanzhong region via rugged mountain passes within the Qin Mountains. As Liu Bang's forces left for Hanzhong, Xiang Yu had his troops following them as "escort", and Liu Bang resorted to burning the gallery roads behind his convoy as a precautionary measure to prevent attacks from the rear, and as a diplomatic gesture of accepting Xiang Yu's arrangement to never return again.

Fan Zeng was later dismissed by Xiang Yu after their respective assertive personalities repeatedly clashed over different opinions, further compounded by Chen Ping's plot to spread rumors and sow discords between them. Despite Xiang Yu's later regret and attempt to re-employ him, Fan Zeng died of illness soon after his dismissal, leaving Xiang Yu with no competent strategist for counselling. However, Fan's prediction of Liu Bang eventually winning later came true as Xiang Yu's ill-considered, cronyism-marred enfeoffment of the Eighteen Kingdoms soon triggered civil wars and rebellions by disenfranchised rebels who missed out, and in the chaos of Xiang Yu trying to quell the uprisings everywhere, Liu Bang would reinvade and reconquer Guanzhong from the Three Qins within merely months of leaving. Xiang Yu progressively lost to Liu Bang in the struggle for supremacy over China from 206 BCE to 203 BCE, and committed suicide after his final defeat at the Battle of Gaixia in December 203 BCE. After subjugating all other rival forces, Liu Bang established the Han dynasty in 202 BCE and became its founding emperor.

== Cultural references ==
In Chinese culture, the term Hongmen Yan (鴻門宴 "Feast at Swan Goose Gate") is used figuratively to refer to a trap or a situation ostensibly joyous but in fact treacherous. Another idiom that relates to the event is "Xiang Zhuang performs a sword dance; his aim is on the Duke of Pei" (項莊舞劍，意在沛公), which refers to somebody making a veiled attack on another person.

The Chinese title of the 2011 film White Vengeance is a reference to the Feast at Hong Gate, while the plot itself is based on this historical incident and other events in the Chu–Han Contention. The 2012 Chinese film The Last Supper is also based on similar source materials.

== See also ==
- List of dining events
- Timeline of the Chu–Han Contention
