= Ying Bu =

Chinese king and warlord (died 196 BC)

Ying Bu 英布
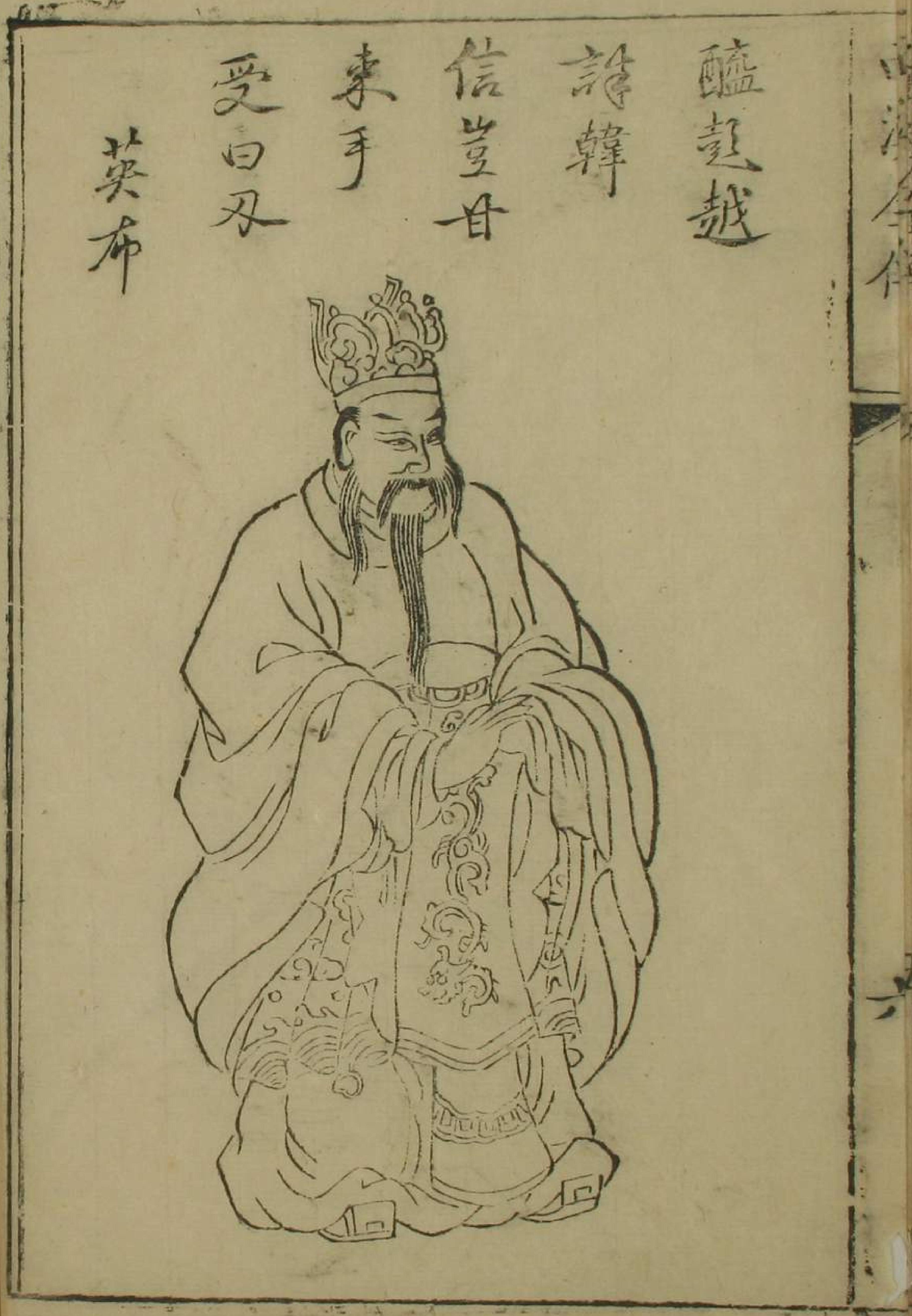

King of Huainan
- Tenure: c.August 203 – November or December 196 BC

King of Jiujiang
- Tenure: 207 – c.August 203 BC
- Born: Unknown; Lu'an, Anhui
- Died: November or December 196 BC; Jingdezhen, Jiangxi
- Spouse: Lady Wu (吳氏)
- Occupation: Military general, monarch, politician, warlord

Ying Bu (died November or December 196 BC) was a Chinese military general, monarch, politician, and warlord who lived during the early Han dynasty. He was a native of Lu County (六縣; present-day Lu'an, Anhui). In his early life under the Qin dynasty, Ying Bu was convicted and sentenced to qing (黥; a form of punishment which involved branding a criminal by tattooing his face), so he was also called Qing Bu (黥布). He was then sent to Mount Li to perform hard labour by constructing Qin Shi Huang's mausoleum. He later escaped with some men and became the leader of a bandit gang. Ying Bu participated in the insurrection against the Qin dynasty after the Dazexiang Uprising broke out in 209 BC. After the uprising failed, he became part of a rebel force led by Xiang Liang. He assisted Xiang Liang's nephew and successor Xiang Yu in overthrowing the Qin dynasty. After the fall of Qin, he initially fought on Xiang Yu's side in the Chu–Han Contention (206–202 BC), a power struggle for supremacy over China between Xiang Yu and Liu Bang (Emperor Gao). However, later, he defected to Liu Bang's side and helped Liu defeat Xiang Yu and become the emperor. During this period of time, Ying Bu held the title "King of Jiujiang". In c.August 203, Liu Bang appointed Ying Bu as a vassal king and granted him the title "King of Huainan". In 196 BC, Ying Bu rebelled against the Han dynasty but was defeated and killed.

== Life ==
=== Early life ===
Ying Bu was born in a family of commoners. In his childhood, a fortune teller once told him that he would become a convict first before becoming a king later. When he became older, Ying Bu committed a crime and under the laws of the Qin dynasty, he was sentenced to qing (黥; a form of punishment which involved branding a criminal by tattooing his face), but he laughed and said, "A fortune teller once told me that I would be convicted before becoming a king. Isn't it so?" He was scorned at by others when they heard him. Ying Bu was later sent to Mount Li to do hard labour by constructing Qin Shi Huang's mausoleum. He befriended many fellow convicts and later escaped with them, and became the leader of a bandit gang.

=== Uprising against Qin ===
In 209 BC, when Chen Sheng and Wu Guang started the Dazexiang Uprising to overthrow the Qin dynasty, Ying Bu joined rebel leader Wu Rui, his father-in-law, and rallied several thousand men. After the uprising was crushed by the Qin general Zhang Han, Ying Bu led his followers north to attack the Qin left and right flanks and defeated the enemy at Qingbo (清波; southwest of present-day Xincai County, Henan), and then moved east. When Ying Bu learnt that Xiang Liang had amassed a large rebel force in Kuaiji (then still centered on present-day Suzhou, not Shaoxing), he led his own followers to join Xiang Liang too.

Ying Bu fought bravely in battle and assisted Xiang Liang in defeating other insurgent leaders such as Jing Ju and Qin Jia (秦嘉). In the summer of 208 BC, Xiang Liang installed King Huai II on the throne of the Chu state, but the king was actually a figurehead used by Xiang Liang and his clan to rally more supporters in the name of restoring Chu. King Huai II granted Ying Bu the title of "Lord Dangyang" (當陽君). Xiang Liang was killed in action against Qin forces at the Battle of Dingtao (定陶, in modern Heze, Shandong province) in the winter of 208 BC, and King Huai II moved his capital to Pengcheng (彭城; present-day Xuzhou, Jiangsu). Ying Bu and other Chu generals were stationed in Pengcheng.

At the time, Qin forces were attacking another insurgent state, Zhao. The Zhao king Zhao Xie (趙歇) requested aid from Chu. King Huai II ordered Song Yi, Xiang Yu (Xiang Liang's nephew) and Fan Zeng to lead an army to rescue Zhao Xie. Xiang Yu accused Song Yi of treason, killed the latter and took control of the army. Ying Bu was originally under Song Yi, so he became Xiang Yu's subordinate after King Huai II approved Xiang Yu's command. In 207 BC, Chu forces led by Xiang Yu, Ying Bu and others defeated a larger Qin army led by Zhang Han at the Battle of Julu. After the battle, at Xin'an (新安; in present-day Yima, Henan), Xiang Yu had Ying Bu oversee the execution of Zhang Han's 200,000 surrendered Qin soldiers by burying them alive.

After his victory at Julu, Xiang Yu led his forces towards Guanzhong (the heartland of the Qin dynasty) and prepared for an invasion. In the winter of 207 BC, the last Qin emperor Ziying surrendered to Liu Bang in Xianyang (the Qin capital), bringing an end to the Qin dynasty. Xiang Yu later occupied Xianyang and divided the former Qin Empire into the Eighteen Kingdoms, each ruled by a vassal king. Ying Bu was named "King of Jiujiang" (九江王).

=== Chu–Han Contention ===
In the fourth lunar month of 206 BC, the rulers of the Eighteen Kingdoms returned to their respective domains. Xiang Yu ostensibly promoted King Huai II of Chu to a more honorific title of "Emperor Yi of Chu", and moved him to Changsha, effectively sending the puppet ruler into exile. Xiang Yu then secretly ordered Ying Bu to kill Emperor Yi, and Ying Bu intercepted the emperor at Chen County (郴縣; present-day Chenzhou, Hunan) and killed him.

In 205 BC, Tian Rong (田榮) started a rebellion in Qi so Xiang Yu led an army to attack him. Xiang Yu requested reinforcements from Ying Bu, but the latter claimed that he was ill and instead sent his subordinates and a few thousand troops to assist Xiang Yu. At the same time, Liu Bang (King of Han) formed an alliance with five other kings and took advantage of Xiang Yu's absence to attack and seize the latter's capital Pengcheng (彭城; present-day Xuzhou, Jiangsu). When Xiang Yu asked help from Ying Bu, the latter claimed that he was ill again and refused to aid Xiang Yu. Xiang Yu was displeased with Ying Bu and sent a messenger to summon the latter but Ying Bu became afraid and refused to go. Xiang Yu did not attack Ying Bu because he faced the threats of Qi and Zhao, and Liu Bang in the west, and also because he felt that Ying Bu was a talent and wanted the latter to remain on his side.

In late 205 BC, Xiang Yu defeated Liu Bang at the Battle of Pengcheng and Liu was forced to retreat to Yu (虞). Liu Bang told his followers, "People like you are not worthy to discuss great plans with me." One of Liu Bang's advisors, Sui He (隨何), asked why, and Liu Bang replied, "Who can help me go to Huainan and persuade (Ying Bu) to betray Chu, and keep Xiang Yu occupied in Qi for several months, then I can easily take control of the empire." Sui He volunteered for the mission and brought 20 escorts to Huainan. Three days after reaching his destination, Sui He had yet to see Ying Bu, so he said to Ying Bu's advisor and henchmen, "The king refuses to see me because Chu is powerful and Han is weak. This is exactly the reason why I'm here. Why don't you allow me to meet him first? If what I've said is true, then that's what he wishes to hear. If what I've said is false, then me and my 20 men are willing to die in Huainan to prove that your king is against Han and loyal to Chu." The advisor relayed Sui He's message to Ying Bu, and Ying agreed to meet Sui He.

Sui He said, "The King of Han sends me to deliver a message to you. I'm curious why you're so close to Chu." Ying Bu responded that he had all along been serving Xiang Yu. Sui He said, "Both you and Xiang Yu are vassal kings. You're willing to be subservient to him because you feel that Chu is powerful and can be relied on. When Xiang Yu was attacking Qi, he fought ahead of his men. You should personally lead Huainan's forces and fight as Chu's vanguard. Yet now you only send 4,000 men to assist Chu, is this what a subordinate should do? When the King of Han was attacking Chu's capital Pengcheng, you should lead your men to help Xiang Yu and fight with the King of Han day and night. You have a large army but you don't send troops to help and would rather stand by and watch. Is this what a subordinate should do? You are subordinate to Chu in name, but actually you rely on yourself. I feel that this won't be good for you. You refuse to betray Chu because you think that Han is weak. However, although Chu is powerful, Xiang Yu has lost the people's trust and support when he implacably broke his promises and murdered Emperor Yi, and now he still thinks that his state is strong enough and he can win any battle. The King of Han is mustering other vassal lords, and garrisoning in Chenggao and Xingyang. His supply routes from Shu (modern Sichuan and Chongqing) avoid deep trenches and are well-defended. When Chu recall its forces, it is separated by Liang in between and is 800-900 li within enemy territory. Now Chu is unable to fight well and is exhausted. Its old and weak soldiers are transporting supplies over great distances. When Chu forces reach Xingyang and Chenggao, Han forces only need to put up a firm defence. In this way, Chu forces can neither advance by attacking nor retreat. Therefore, I say that Chu is unreliable. If Chu wins Han, other vassal states will help each other for fear of Chu. As such, we can see that if Chu becomes more powerful, it will invite hostility from many sides. It's obvious that Chu is worse than Han. I'm puzzled as to why you choose to depend on Chu, which is at stake, instead of Han, which has nothing to lose. I don't think that Huainan's forces are sufficient to resist Chu, but if you betray Chu, Xiang Yu will be held up in Qi for several months, and Han has higher chances of taking over the empire. I sincerely hope you can join the alliance of King of Han. He'll grant you a fief larger than the current Huainan you have. As such, he sends me to present this plan to you and hope that you'll consider it." Ying Bu agreed but he kept silent about his defection.

At the same time, Xiang Yu had sent a messenger to Huainan to request reinforcements from Ying Bu. Sui He called for the messenger and declared, "The King of Jiujiang has already joined Han. Why does he need to send troops to help Chu?" Ying Bu was startled. The Chu messenger was surprised and left. Sui He then said to Ying Bu, "It's now a fact (that you've joined Han), so you should kill the Chu messenger and stop him from returning to Chu. You should also ally with Han as soon as possible.", and Ying Bu heeded his advice.

When Xiang Yu learnt that Ying Bu had turned against him, he sent Xiang Sheng (項聲) and Long Ju to attack Huainan while he remained behind to attack Xiayi (下邑). Months later Long Ju defeated Ying Bu and conquered Jiujiang. Ying Bu was afraid that he would be killed so he fled to Han territory.

Ying Bu wanted to meet Liu Bang after he arrived in Han. Liu Bang was sitting on his bed and washing his feet when Ying Bu came to see him. Ying Bu was furious because he felt that Liu Bang was treating him with contempt, and he regretted joining Han and wanted to commit suicide. When Ying Bu was shown to his living quarters, he was surprised to see that everything was similar to Liu Bang's and he was delighted. He then sent his men to Jiujiang and learnt that Xiang Yu's uncle Xiang Bo had taken control of his former troops and killed his family. His men also found several of his former followers and brought them back to Han. Liu Bang put Ying Bu in command of some troops.

In 203 BC, Liu Bang instated Ying Bu as "King of Huainan" (淮南王). Later that year, Ying Bu led an army to attack Jiujiang and conquered many cities. He entered Jiujiang together with Liu Gu (劉賈) and persuaded Zhou Yin (周殷) to defect from Chu to Han. Ying Bu and Zhou Yin led their armies to join Liu Bang in attacking Xiang Yu and eventually defeated Xiang at the Battle of Gaixia in 202 BC. Xiang Yu committed suicide and the rest of Chu surrendered to Han.

Following his victory in the Chu–Han Contention, Liu Bang was proclaimed "Emperor" and became historically known as "Emperor Gaozu of Han" after establishing the Han dynasty. Ying Bu became a vassal king of the Han dynasty, under the title King of Huainan (淮南王), with his capital at Lu (六; present-day Lu'an, Anhui), and the commanderies of Jiujiang (九江), Lushan (廬山), Hengshan (衡山) and Yuzhang (豫章) under his control.

=== Rebellion against Han ===
In early 196 BC, Han Xin, the Marquis of Huaiyin (淮陰侯), was executed on Empress Lü Zhi's order. Ying Bu became uneasy when he learnt of this. In c.April of that year, Peng Yue, the King of Liang (梁王), suffered a similar fate, and his corpse was minced into pieces and the gory parts distributed to various nobles and vassal kings. Ying Bu was terrified and was worried that he would end up like Han Xin and Peng Yue, so he started gathering his forces and paying closer attention to happenings in the nearby areas.

One of Ying Bu's favourite concubines fell sick and was sent for medical treatment. The physician who attended to her was a neighbour of a palace official called Ben He (賁赫). As Ying Bu's concubine often visited the physician, Ben He used the opportunity to get close to her and offered her expensive gifts, and they had drinks at the physician's house. When the concubine returned home she praised Ben He in front of Ying Bu, saying that Ben He was a warm hearted man. Ying Bu asked her how she knew Ben He, and she told him everything. Ying Bu began to suspect that Ben He was having an affair with his concubine. Ben He became afraid when he heard that Ying Bu suspected him so he feigned illness and remained at home. Ying Bu became more angry and wanted to arrest Ben He. In desperation, Ben He accused Ying Bu of plotting a rebellion and fled to the capital Chang'an. Ying Bu sent his men to pursue Ben He but could not catch up with the latter. Upon reaching Chang'an, Ben He claimed that Ying Bu was showing signs of plotting a rebellion and urged the Han imperial court to send an army to launch a preemptive attack on Ying Bu. Emperor Gaozu discussed with his chancellor Xiao He, and the latter commented, "Ying Bu wouldn't do this. I believe that his enemies are trying to frame him. Please put Ben He under custody first and then send people to investigate Ying Bu." When Ying Bu saw that Ben He had escaped and accused him of plotting a rebellion, he suspected that Ben He had already revealed what he had been secretly planning to do. Besides, the Han imperial court had sent people to investigate, so Ying Bu decided to proceed with his plan. He killed Ben He's family and started a rebellion in August or September 196 BCE. When news of Ying Bu's revolt reached Chang'an, Emperor Gaozu pardoned Ben He and appointed him as a general.

Gaozu summoned his subjects to discuss on how to deal with Ying Bu and they urged the emperor to send an army to attack Ying Bu and destroy him. Xiahou Ying consulted Xue Gong (薛公), a former lingyin of Chu, and asked him, "The emperor granted him a fief and the title of a vassal king, allowing him to enjoy luxuries and rule over thousands, why does he still want to rebel?" Xue Gong replied, "Peng Yue and Han Xin were executed in the past two years. The three of them contributed heavily to the dynasty's founding and are almost equal to each other. Ying Bu feared that he would experience the same fate (as Han Xin and Peng Yue) so he rebelled." Xiahou Ying then recommended Xue Gong to Emperor Gaozu. Xue Gong analysed to the emperor that Ying Bu would make three possible moves: 1. Attack and capture Wu, Chu, Qi, Lu, Yan and Zhao, and the Han dynasty would lose the Shandong region as a result; 2. Attack and capture Wu, Chu, Han, Wei, rely on supplies from Aoyu to block Chenggao, the outcome of this move was uncertain; 3. Attack Wu, Xiacai, return to Yue and Changsha, there was nothing to worry if Ying Bu made this move. Xue Gong predicted that Ying Bu would take the third option because Ying Bu was a convict and he attained his kingly status through his own efforts, and everything he did was for personal gain and he did not care about the people and his descendants. Gaozu put Xue Gong in charge of 1,000 households and installed his son Liu Chang (劉長) as "Prince of Huainan" to replace Ying Bu. Gaozu then personally led an army to suppress Ying Bu's rebellion.

Before Ying Bu rebelled, he told his men, "The emperor is old and hates going to war. He'll definitely not come. Even if he sends any of his generals, among them only Han Xin and Peng Yue are dangerous, but since both of them are already dead there's nothing to fear." Ying Bu moved east to attack Jing (荊) and in Fuling (富陵) he defeated and killed Liu Gu (劉賈), Prince of Jing (荊王). He then crossed the Huai River to attack Chu. Chu sent its forces to intercept Ying Bu between Xu (徐) and Tong (僮), with three armies ready to come to each other's aid if any came under attack. Someone warned the Chu commanders, "Ying Bu is versed in warfare and the people have long feared him. Chu forces are fighting on their own territory and are easily scattered. Now the army is divided into three forces, if one is defeated the other two would follow suit. How is it possible for them to help each other?" The warning was ignored. Ying Bu later really did defeat one army and the other two dispersed.

Ying Bu then advanced west and encountered the Han army led by Emperor Gaozu in Qixi (蕲西; south of present-day Su County, Anhui) and they battled at Zhui (甀). Ying Bu's army was well-trained so Gaozu had to retreat to Yongcheng (庸城). From a distance, Gaozu saw that Ying Bu's forces were deployed like Xiang Yu's and he hated that. Gaozu asked Ying Bu, "Why do you want to rebel?", to which Ying Bu replied, "I want to be the emperor." Gaozu was furious and scolded Ying Bu, and launched an attack. Ying Bu was defeated and retreated across the Huai River. At times he halted and turned back to resist the Han forces but failed. Ying Bu was eventually left with around 100 men and they retreated to south of the Yangtze River.

Ying Bu was Wu Rui's son-in-law, so Wu Chen (吳臣; Wu Rui's son), who would posthumously be known as King Cheng of Changsha (長沙成王), sent a messenger to Ying Bu, lying that he would help Ying Bu escape to Nanyue. Ying Bu believed Wu Chen and followed the messenger to Poyang (番陽), where he was killed by peasants in Zi Village (茲鄉).

== Legacy ==
Ying Bu is sometimes venerated as a door god in Chinese and Taoist temples, usually partnered with Peng Yue, other Han general. He is one of the 32 historical figures who appear as special characters in the video game Romance of the Three Kingdoms XI by Koei. He is also featured under the name "Qing Bu" as a playable character of the "Muscleman" class in the action role-playing game Prince of Qin.
