= Jing Ju =

- Traditional Chinese: 景駒
- Simplified Chinese: 景驹
Transcriptions
Standard Mandarin
- Hanyu Pinyin: Jǐng Jū
- Wade–Giles: Ching Chü
Yue: Cantonese
- Jyutping: Ging2 Keoi1

Jing Ju (died 208 BC) was one of the leaders during the Chen Sheng and Wu Guang uprising against the Qin dynasty between 209 and 208 BC.

Upon hearing the news of Chen Sheng's defeat by the Qin forces and uncertain about his death, his subordinate Qin Jia (秦嘉) persuaded him to claim the title "King of Chu". Shortly after, Xiang Liang claimed that Jing Ju had betrayed Chen Sheng by claiming the latter's title, so he sent Ying Bu to defeat Qin Jia, which resulted in executions for both Qin Jia and Jing Ju.

Titles in pretence
Preceded by Chen Sheng	— TITULAR — King of Chu; 209 BC – 208 BC; Reason for succession failure: Defeated by Xiang Liang	Succeeded by Emperor Yi of Chu
