= Luoyang Ancient Tombs Museum =

Museum in Luoyang, Henan, China

Coordinates: 34°44′2.868″N 112°24′32.292″E

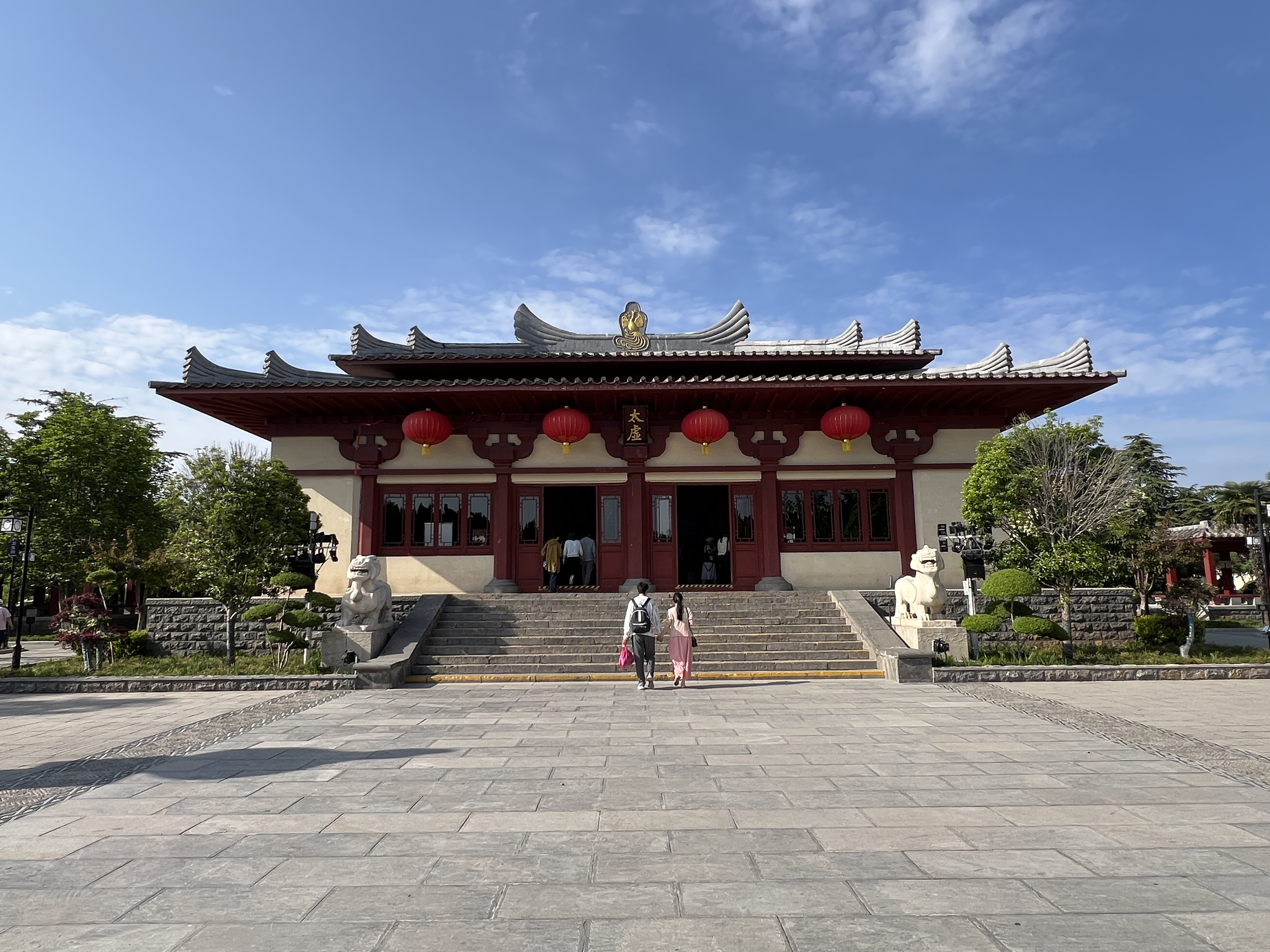
Northern Wei–style architecture

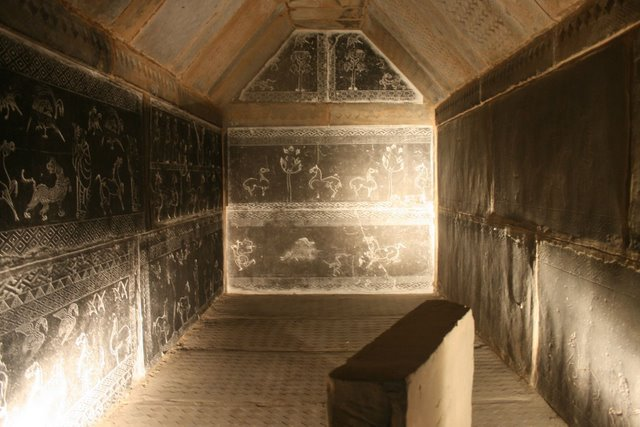
Eastern Han tomb in the museum

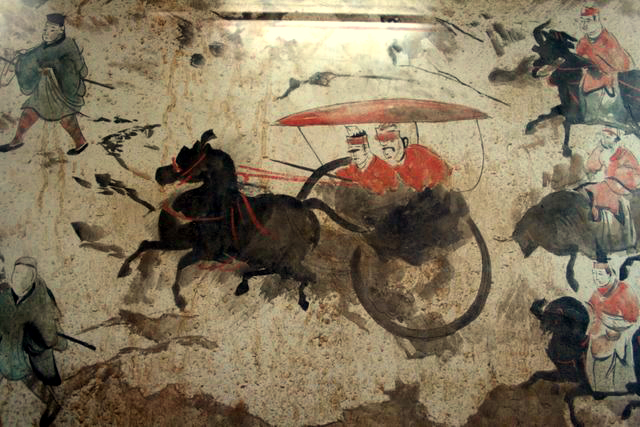
Eastern Han dynasty fresco in the museum

Luoyang Ancient Tombs Museum (Chinese: 洛阳古墓博物馆; pinyin: Luoyang gumu bowuguan) is a museum presenting Chinese ancient tombs in Luoyang, in the Henan province of China.

The museum was established in 1984 and opened to the public in 1987. It is located on Mang Hill (邙山; pinyin: Mangshan), in the eastern side of Zhongtou Village, about 10 km (6.2 mi) north of Luoyang City. The site occupies 3 hectares. Mangshan, where the museum is located, is a hill about 300m above sea level that was historically a burial ground.

== Exhibits ==
The museum comprises two parts: an underground and an above ground sections. The above ground part contains a Han-style gate and several halls. Tomb models from the Stone Age to the Han dynasty, restored funerary objects and funeral rituals are displayed in the eastern hall.

The underground section is a tomb groups site which is about 7 meters underground and contains 22 tombs from Henan province. It is divided into three halls: the hall of Wei and Jin dynasties, the hall of Western Han and Eastern Han dynasties, and the hall of Tang and Song dynasties.

The tomb of Emperor Xuanwu of Northern Wei (483–515) is part of the museum. Luoyang was the capital of the Northern Wei dynasty from 493 to 534.

== See also ==
- Luoyang Museum
