= Xiang Bo =

Chinese noble

- Born: Unknown; Xiaxiang (present-day Suqian, Jiangsu)
- Died: 192 BC
- Parents: Xiang Yan (father); Lady Fen (mother)
- Relatives: Liu Sui (son); Xiang Liang (brother); Xiang Yu (nephew); Xiang Zhuang (nephew)

Xiang Bo (項伯; died 192 BC), formally the Marquis of Yeyang (射陽侯), was a Chinese noble of the early Han dynasty.

== Early life ==
Xiang Bo's given name was Chan (纏) but he went by his courtesy name Bo (伯), hence he was known as Xiang Bo. He was from Xiaxiang (下相), which is around present-day Suqian, Jiangsu, and descended from a noble family who had served for generations in the army of the Chu state of the Warring States period. His father, Xiang Yan (項燕), was a general who was killed in action while leading the defence of Chu against an invasion by the Qin state in 223 BC.

After the fall of Chu, the Qin state unified China under its rule by 221 BC and established the Qin dynasty. Xiang Bo and his family lived as commoners under Qin rule for years. On one occasion, after killing somebody in his hometown, he fled to Xiapi (下邳; present-day Suining County, Jiangsu), where he met and befriended Zhang Liang, who helped him evade the authorities.

In 209 BC, when uprisings broke out throughout China to overthrow the Qin dynasty, Xiang Bo joined his brother Xiang Liang and his nephew Xiang Yu in starting a rebellion in Wu (吳; around present-day Suzhou, Jiangsu) with the aim of restoring the Chu state, and they managed to rally about 8,000 men to join their cause. They also found Xiong Xin, a grandson of King Huai of Chu, and made him their king. Xiong Xin, who became historically known as King Huai II, was merely a figurehead under the Xiangs' control. After Xiang Liang was killed in battle against Qin forces at Dingtao in 208 BC, Xiang Yu remained in control of the Chu rebel group's military power.

== Feast at Swan Goose Gate ==
In 206 BC, the Qin dynasty ended when its last emperor Ziying surrendered to a rebel group led by Liu Bang, who was formerly part of the Chu rebel group led by the Xiangs. According to an earlier promise by King Huai II, whoever first occupied the Guanzhong region, where the Qin capital Xianyang (in present-day Xi'an, Shaanxi) was, would be made king of Guanzhong. Xiang Yu was unhappy that Liu Bang had beat him in the race to Guanzhong so he prepared to attack Liu Bang.

Xiang Bo, upon hearing that Zhang Liang was one of Liu Bang's advisers at the time, feared for his friend's life so he secretly met Zhang Liang to warn him about Xiang Yu's impending attack. Zhang Liang brought Xiang Bo with him to meet Liu Bang, who treated Xiang Bo respectfully and offered his daughter's hand-in-marriage to Xiang Bo's son. Touched by Liu Bang's generosity, Xiang Bo promised to help Liu Bang mediate the conflict with Xiang Yu.

After returning to his camp, Xiang Bo met Xiang Yu and managed to persuade his nephew to give Liu Bang a chance to explain himself. The next day, Xiang Yu hosted a feast at Swan Goose Gate (鴻門; in present-day Lintong District, Xi'an, Shaanxi) and invited Liu Bang to attend. During the feast, Xiang Yu's adviser Fan Zeng hinted to his lord to give the order to kill Liu Bang, but was ignored so he secretly instructed Xiang Yu's cousin Xiang Zhuang to pretend to perform a sword dance to entertain everyone and find an opportunity to assassinate Liu Bang. Sensing that Liu Bang was in danger, Xiang Bo stood up, drew his sword and offered to join the sword dance. Whenever Xiang Zhuang thrust his sword at Liu Bang, Xiang Bo parried the blow or used his body to block Xiang Zhuang, saving Liu Bang's life. Xiang Yu eventually ordered them to stop the sword dance and return to their seats.

== Later life ==
Starting in late 206 BC, Xiang Yu and Liu Bang engaged in a power struggle, historically known as the Chu–Han Contention, for supremacy over China. During this time, Xiang Bo often attempted to get both sides to make peace but to no avail. The war ended in 202 BC with Xiang Yu's defeat and suicide at the Battle of Gaixia; Liu Bang became emperor and established the Han dynasty.

As an expression of gratitude to Xiang Bo for saving his life during the Feast at Swan Goose Gate, Liu Bang pardoned Xiang Bo and his family, granted him the imperial family name "Liu", and enfeoffed him as the Marquis of Yeyang (射陽侯), with the lands southwest of present-day Huai'an, Jiangsu as his marquisate. After Xiang Bo died in 192 BC, his son Liu Sui (劉雎) was not allowed to inherit the marquisate because he had committed an offence.
