= Xiang Zhuang =

Chinese warrior and assassin

- Born: Unknown; Xiaxiang (present-day Suqian, Jiangsu)
- Died: Unknown
- Occupation: Warrior
- Family: Xiang Yu (cousin); Xiang Bo (uncle); Xiang Liang (uncle)

Xiang Zhuang (項莊; fl. 206 BC) was a Chinese warrior best known for his role in the Feast at Swan Goose Gate in 206 BC. He was a younger cousin of Xiang Yu, the Hegemon-King of Western Chu who fought for supremacy over China during the Chu–Han Contention (206–202 BC) against Liu Bang, the founding emperor of the Han dynasty.

== Life ==
The only mention of Xiang Zhuang in history was his role in the Feast at Swan Goose Gate. The feast was hosted by Xiang Yu, the de facto leader of the various rebel groups which overthrew the Qin dynasty in 206 BC. Xiang Yu was unhappy that Liu Bang (then known as the Duke of Pei 沛公), who led one of the rebel groups, had beat him in the race to capture the Guanzhong region, the heartland of the Qin dynasty.

Acting on his adviser Fan Zeng's suggestion, Xiang Yu hosted a feast at Swan Goose Gate (鴻門; in present-day Lintong District, Xi'an, Shaanxi) outside Xianyang, the former capital of the Qin dynasty, and invited Liu Bang to attend. His plan was to have Liu Bang assassinated during the feast.

When Liu Bang showed up, Xiang Yu began having second thoughts and ignored Fan Zeng's hints to give the order to kill Liu. Frustrated at Xiang Yu's indecisiveness, Fan Zeng secretly summoned Xiang Zhuang and instructed him to pretend to perform a sword dance to entertain the guests and find an opportunity to assassinate Liu Bang.

Xiang Zhuang followed the instruction and tried to kill Liu Bang during the dance. However, Xiang Yu's uncle Xiang Bo, who was a close friend of Liu Bang's adviser Zhang Liang, suddenly stood up and joined the dance. Whenever Xiang Zhuang thrust his sword at Liu Bang, Xiang Bo parried his blow or stood in between Xiang Zhuang and Liu Bang to shield the latter. Xiang Yu eventually ordered Xiang Zhuang and Xiang Bo to stop the dance and return to their seats.

This incident became the origin of a Chinese idiom used to describe somebody making a veiled attack on another person: "Xiang Zhuang performs a sword dance; his target is actually the Duke of Pei." (項莊舞劍, 意在沛公)
