= Emperor Yi of Chu =

King of Chu, China from 208 to 206 BC

- King Huai of Chu

Emperor of Chu
- Reign: 208–206 BC
- Born: Unknown
- Died: 206 BC
Full name
- Family name: Mi (羋); Clan name: Xiong (熊); Given name: Xin (心)
- House: House of Mi/Xiong

Emperor Yi of Chu
- Traditional Chinese: 楚義帝
- Simplified Chinese: 楚义帝
Transcriptions
Standard Mandarin
- Hanyu Pinyin: Chǔ Yì Dì
- Wade–Giles: Ch'u I Ti

King Huai of Chu
- Traditional Chinese: 楚懷王
- Simplified Chinese: 楚怀王
Transcriptions
Standard Mandarin
- Hanyu Pinyin: Chǔ Huái Wáng
- Wade–Giles: Ch'u Huai Wang

Xiong Xin (personal name)
- Chinese: 熊心
Transcriptions
Standard Mandarin
- Hanyu Pinyin: Xíong Xīn
- Wade–Giles: Hsiung Hsin

Emperor Yi of Chu (died 206 BC), also known as King Huai II of Chu before receiving his de jure emperor title, personal name Xiong Xin, was the ruler of the revived Chu state during the final years of the Qin dynasty of China. In 209 BC, when rebellions broke out throughout China to overthrow the Qin dynasty, the Chu state, which had been previously conquered by the Qin state (precursor of the Qin dynasty) during the Warring States period, was revived as an insurgent state against Qin imperial rule. Xiong Xin, as a descendant of the Chu royal family and a grandson of King Huai of Chu, was found by Xiang Liang, who descended from a Chu noble family, and installed as the puppet ruler of the revived Chu state. After Xiang Liang was killed in battle in 208 BC, Xiong Xin attempted to assert his authority through Song Yi, whom he put in charge of Chu's armed forces. However, in the following year, Xiang Liang's nephew Xiang Yu launched a coup against Song Yi and seized power, making Xiong Xin a figurehead once more. In 206 BC, the rebels overthrew the Qin dynasty, after which Xiang Yu, who had emerged as the de facto leader of all the rebel groups, divided the former Qin Empire into the Eighteen Kingdoms. He promoted Xiong Xin to a more honourable title – Emperor Yi of Chu – and made him the nominal sovereign ruler over all the Eighteen Kingdoms. Xiang Yu then had Emperor Yi relocated to Chen County (郴縣; present-day Chenzhou, Hunan) and secretly ordered Ying Bu to assassinate the emperor.

== Early life ==
Xiong Xin was a descendant of the royal family of the Chu state in the Warring States period, and a grandson of King Huai of Chu. However, he was not in the main line of succession and there were four kings who succeeded his grandfather before the Chu state was conquered by the Qin state in 223 BC. Xiong Xin lived as a commoner under Qin rule after the fall of Chu.

=== King of Chu ===
In 209 BC, the Dazexiang Uprising broke out under the leadership of Chen Sheng, who proclaimed himself "King of Zhangchu" (張楚王; lit. "king of rising Chu") and aimed to overthrow the Qin dynasty. Although Chen Sheng's uprising was crushed by Qin imperial forces, other rebellions erupted throughout China to overthrow the Qin dynasty and restore the former six states conquered by Qin about two decades ago. The leader of the Chu insurgent state, Xiang Liang, was advised by Fan Zeng to seek a member of the Chu royal family and install him on the throne to garner more support from the people. Xiang Liang found Xiong Xin, who was living as a shepherd, and installed him on the throne in the summer of 208 BC. Xiong Xin ruled under the title of "King Huai II of Chu". (Note: In 299 BC, King Huai of Chu was tricked into attending a conference in the Qin state, where he was captured and kept as a hostage in Qin territory until his death. Xiang Liang suggested to Xiong Xin to use his grandfather's kingly title to evoke a sense of nostalgia and thus enhance his legitimacy, because King Huai's tragic fate was still deeply remembered by the people of Chu. However, "King Huai" was actually a posthumous name and would be inappropriate for a living monarch.)

King Huai II was effectively a puppet ruler because the power of Chu was concentrated in Xiang Liang's hands. However, after Xiang Liang was killed at the Battle of Dingtao in the winter of 208 BC, King Huai II seized the control of the armies of two Chu generals, Xiang Yu and Lü Chen, and gradually began to assert his authority. After that, the king ordered Song Yi and Liu Bang to lead two armies to attack Qin, and promised to award the title "King of Guanzhong" to whoever entered Guanzhong (the Qin heartland) first. Xiang Liang's nephew, Xiang Yu, was the second-in-command to Song Yi, who led his army to attack Qin forces led by Zhang Han. Zhang Han's army was besieging Handan, the capital of the Zhao state, and Song Yi refused to advance any further to assist the Zhao forces. Xiang Yu took Song Yi by surprise in a meeting, falsely accused him of treason, killed him and usurped his command. He then sent a messenger to inform King Huai II, who reluctantly approved his command. In the winter of 207 BC, Liu Bang arrived in Guanzhong first, before Xiang Yu. The last Qin ruler, Ziying, surrendered to Liu Bang and brought an end to the Qin dynasty.

=== Emperor of Chu ===
According to the promise made earlier by King Huai II, Liu Bang should rightfully have become the "King of Guanzhong", but after Xiang Yu reached Guanzhong, he wrote a letter to King Huai II to ask the king to give him the title instead. King Huai II's reply was to the effect of "per my earlier promise", but Xiang Yu ignored him and took control of Guanzhong from Liu Bang since he was more militarily powerful than Liu Bang. Xiang Yu then proclaimed himself "Hegemon-King of Western Chu" and divided the former Qin Empire into the Eighteen Kingdoms, each ruled by one of the leaders of the rebel forces which overthrew the Qin dynasty. He also promoted King Huai II to a seemingly more "honourable" title – Emperor Yi of Chu. However, later, he had the puppet emperor relocated to Chen County (郴縣; present-day Chenzhou, Hunan), thereby effectively sending the emperor into exile.

=== Death ===
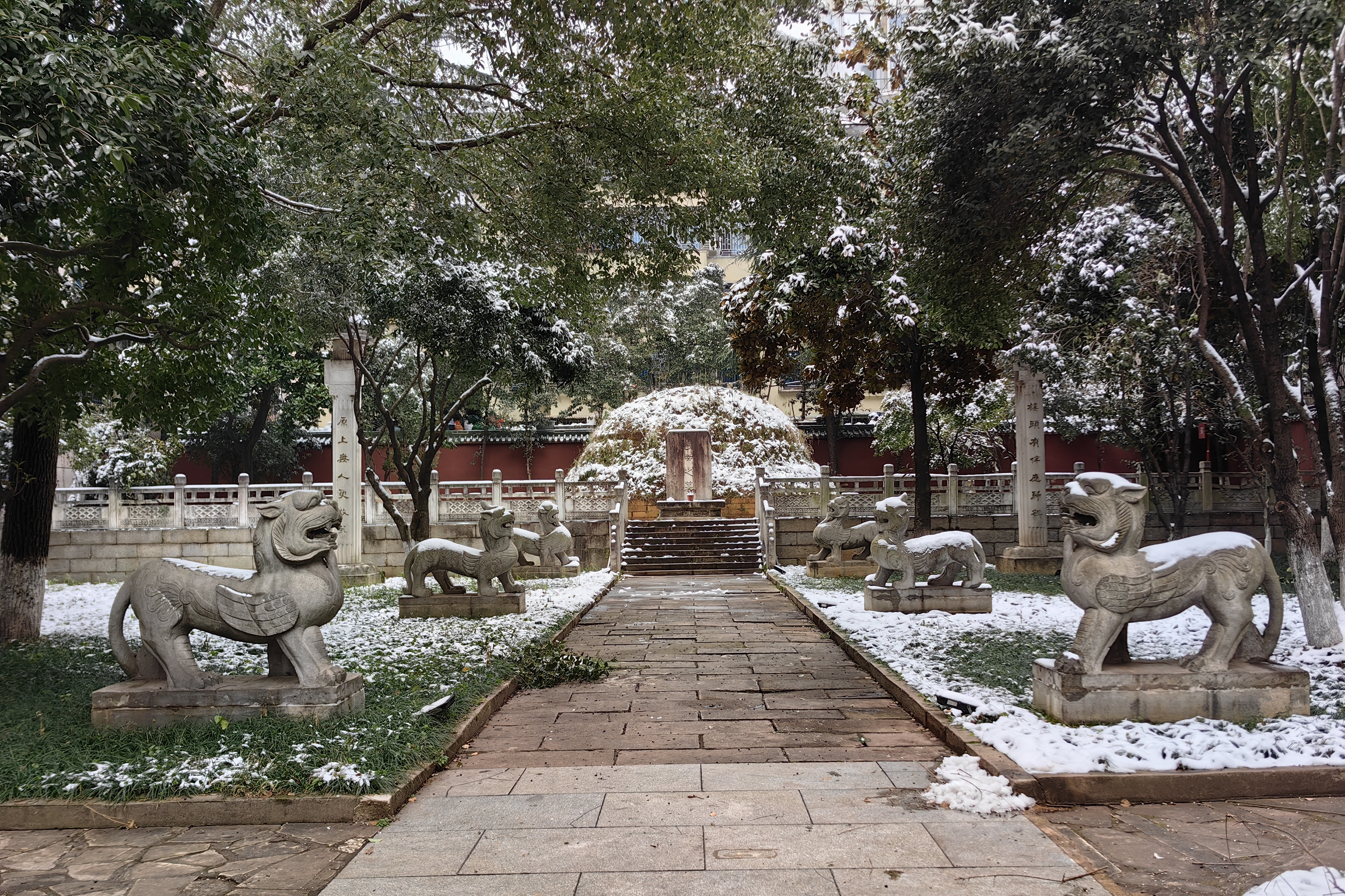
Mausoleum of Emperor Yi of Chu in Beihu, Chenzhou, Hunan

Emperor Yi was aware that Xiang Yu wanted to force him into exile, so he feigned illness and used that as an excuse to postpone his trip to Chen County, but to no avail. Xiang Yu still forced him to make his way from Pengcheng (彭城; present-day Xuzhou, Jiangsu) to Chen County. At the same time, he secretly ordered Ying Bu, Wu Rui and Gong Ao to kill the emperor during the journey to Chen County. Emperor Yi was murdered by Ying Bu's men near Chen County and buried by the locals at a hill in the southwest of the county.

Between 206 and 202 BC, a power struggle for supremacy over China (historically known as the Chu–Han Contention) broke out between Xiang Yu and Liu Bang. Liu Bang used Emperor Yi's death as political propaganda to justify his war against Xiang Yu. In 205 BC, he held a three-day memorial service for the emperor, accused Xiang Yu of committing regicide, and rallied support from the people against Xiang Yu. In 202 BC, the Chu–Han Contention concluded with victory for Liu Bang, who became the sovereign ruler of China and established the Han dynasty. Liu Bang ordered his generals Zhou Bo, Wang Ling and Fan Kuai, who had been enfeoffed as marquises, to conduct memorial services for Emperor Yi in their respective marquisates.

== Legacy ==
Yi sometimes appears as a door god in Chinese and Taoist temples, usually paired with the last Qin ruler Ziying.

== See also ==
- Timeline of the Chu–Han Contention

== Notes ==
Emperor Yi of Chu House of Mi Died: 206 BC
Titles in pretence
Preceded by Jing Ju	— TITULAR — King of Chu; Royal descent claimant 208–206 BC; Reason for succession failure: Assassinated	Succeeded by Hegemon-King of Western Chu
Recreated Title last held by Qin Er Shi	— TITULAR — Emperor of China; Royal descent claimant 206 BC; Reason for succession failure: Assassinated	Succeeded by Hegemon-King of Western Chu
