= Fan Zeng =

Advisor to Xiang Yu

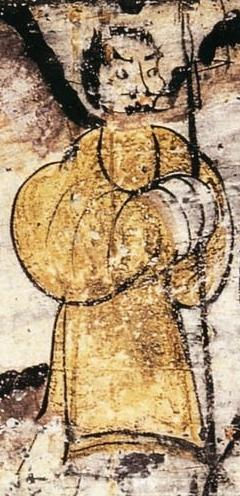
- Fan Zeng as depicted in a Han dynasty fresco
- Born: 277 BC (Note: According to Xiang Yu's biography in the Shiji, Fan Zeng was 70 years old (by East Asian age reckoning) in 207 BC, so his birth year was estimated to be 277 BC.); Chaohu, Anhui
- Died: 204 BC (aged 73); Jiangsu
- Occupation: Adviser

Fan Zeng (范增; 277–204 BC) was an adviser to the Chinese warlord Xiang Yu, who fought for supremacy over China during the Chu–Han Contention (206–202 BC) with Liu Bang, the founding emperor of the Han dynasty.

== Early life ==
Fan was from Juchao (居鄛), which is in present-day Yafu Subdistrict, Chaohu, Anhui. Although he had led most of his life as a recluse, he was known for being well-versed in strategy. Around 207 BC, at the age of 69, he met Xiang Liang, the leader of a rebel group seeking to overthrow the ruling Qin dynasty and restore the Chu state of the Warring States period. He advised Xiang Liang to find a descendant of the royal family of Chu and put him on the throne to secure greater legitimacy for the rebel group's cause and attract more people from the former Chu lands to join them. Xiang Liang heeded Fan's advice and found Xiong Xin, a grandson of King Huai of Chu, and made him the figurehead ruler of the Chu rebel group under the title "King Huai II".

== Service under Xiang Yu ==
After Xiang Liang was killed in battle at Dingtao against Qin forces, Fan continued serving as an adviser to Xiang Liang's nephew, Xiang Yu. Xiang Yu respectfully addressed Fan Zeng as yafu (亞父; "second father").

In 206 BC, Fan noticed that Liu Bang, a rebel leader who had led his followers to join the Chu rebel group earlier, was particularly popular and ambitious, he constantly urged Xiang Yu to find opportunities to kill Liu Bang in case the latter posed a threat to him in the future. Yet, Xiang Yu did not heed Fan's advice.

During the Feast at Swan Goose Gate, Fan secretly instructed Xiang Yu's cousin Xiang Zhuang to pretend to perform a sword dance and use the chance to assassinate Liu Bang, who was attending the feast at Xiang Yu's invitation. However, Xiang Zhuang's attempt failed when Xiang Bo, another uncle of Xiang Yu, intervened and blocked Xiang Zhuang every time he tried to kill Liu Bang. Liu Bang eventually escaped from the feast under the pretence of going to the latrine. When Fan heard about it, he was so furious that he exclaimed,

"Alas! This brat (Xiang Yu) is not worthy enough to make plans with me. The Duke of Pei (Liu Bang) will definitely be the one who seizes the Empire from King Xiang (Xiang Yu). We will all become his (Liu Bang's) prisoners."

In 204 BC, during the Chu–Han Contention, when Liu Bang was besieged by Xiang Yu at the Battle of Xingyang, he requested to make peace. When Xiang Yu wanted to accept Liu Bang's peace offer, Fan strongly objected to it, warning him that he would regret his decision. Xiang Yu initially heeded Fan's advice and continued attacking Liu Bang. However, one of Liu Bang's advisers, Chen Ping, secretly bribed some of Xiang Yu's men to spread rumours that Fan had the intention of betraying Xiang Yu. Falling for the ruse, Xiang Yu ultimately dismissed Fan, who had also made up his mind to leave Xiang Yu. Before his departure, Fan told Xiang Yu,

"The final outcome is obvious. Take good care of yourself, my lord. Please allow me to retire in peace."

== Death ==
Fan died of illness on his journey home in Pengcheng (彭城; present-day Xuzhou, Jiangsu) and was buried there. His hometown in present-day Chaohu, Anhui is named Yafu Subdistrict in remembrance of him.

One yeshi（野史; "unofficial historical record") mentioned that Fan lived in retirement under a different identity at Mount Jiuzhe (九遮山) in present-day Tiantai County, Zhejiang, where he worked as a healer and still kept himself up-to-date with current affairs. When he heard that Xiang Yu had died at the Battle of Gaixia, he lamented that Xiang Yu had met his downfall because he did not listen to him. When the locals asked him whether he was Fan Zeng, he denied it, claiming that Fan had already died at Pengcheng. He was never seen again after that.
