= Xiang Liang =

Qin dynasty rebel

- Born: Unknown; Suqian, Jiangsu
- Died: 208 BCE; Dingtao, Heze, Shandong
- Occupation: Rebel leader
- Parents: Xiang Yan (father); Lady Fen (mother)
- Relatives: Xiang Chao (brother); Xiang Rong ( brother); Xiang Yi ( brother); Xiang Jian ( brother); Xiang Chan ( brother); Xiang he ( brother); Xiang Bo (brother); Xiang Yu (nephew); Xiang Zhuang (nephew)

Xiang Liang (項梁; died 208 BC) was a Chinese military leader who led a rebellion against the Qin dynasty between 209 and 208 BC. He is best known as an uncle of Xiang Yu, the rival of the Han dynasty's founding emperor Liu Bang during the Chu–Han Contention.

== Early life ==
Xiang Liang was from Xiaxiang (下相; present-day Suqian, Jiangsu) and he descended from an aristocratic family whose members had served as generals in the Chu state during the Warring States period. His father, Xiang Yan (項燕), had been killed in action in 223 BC while leading the defence of Chu against an invasion by the Qin state, which ultimately unified China under the Qin dynasty.

After the fall of Chu, the Xiang family lived as commoners under Qin rule for years. When Xiang Liang's brother Xiang Chao (項超) died, Xiang Liang took Xiang Chao's son, Xiang Yu, under his care. Having high hopes for his nephew, Xiang Liang went to great lengths to ensure that Xiang Yu was well-instructed in swordsmanship and scholarly arts. However, Xiang Yu disappointed his uncle when he failed to master what he had been taught. Upon realising that Xiang Yu had an interest in military strategy, Xiang Liang attempted to teach his nephew himself but the latter stopped after grasping the key concepts, saying that learning military strategy was akin to treating warfare like a game. Xiang Liang ultimately gave up on his nephew, who showed no sign of motivation or apparent talent apart from his great strength, and let the latter decide his own destiny.

== Leading a rebellion against the Qin dynasty ==
On one occasion, Xiang Liang killed someone and was forced to flee with his family to Wu County (in present-day Suzhou, Jiangsu) to evade the authorities. At the time, Qin Shi Huang was on an inspection tour in that area. While accompanying his uncle to watch the emperor's procession pass by, Xiang Yu said that he could replace the emperor, prompting a shocked Xiang Liang to immediately cover Xiang Yu's mouth with his hand. From then on, Xiang Liang began seeing his nephew in a different light. Due to his aristocratic lineage, Xiang Liang gradually gained influence among the locals in Wu County and became their representative in dealings with the local government. He also leveraged on his popularity to rally supporters and form a secret militia in preparation for a future uprising against the Qin dynasty to restore the Chu state.

In 209 BC, peasant rebellions erupted throughout China to overthrow the Qin dynasty. Yin Tong (殷通), the Qin-appointed administrator of Kuaiji Commandery, considered turning against the Qin government so he invited Xiang Liang to discuss how they would start a rebellion. However, Xiang Liang, aided by Xiang Yu, killed Yin Tong instead and initiated the uprising on his own, managing to rally about 8,000 men to join his cause. Xiang Liang then declared himself the new administrator of Kuaiji and put Xiang Yu in charge of their armed forces.

Xiang Liang led his followers across the Yangtze later and established a base in Xiapi (下邳; present-day Pizhou, Jiangsu). At the time, some other rebel groups pledged allegiance to Xiang Liang, further increasing the strength of his rebel group to between 60,000 and 70,000.

In 208 BC, heeding Fan Zeng's advice, Xiang Liang sent his men to search for Xiong Xin, a grandson of King Huai I of the former Chu state, and installed him on the throne as King Huai II. His purpose was to use King Huai II as a figurehead to rally support from people in the former Chu territories to join him in overthrowing the Qin dynasty. In the meantime, although the Xiangs paid nominal allegiance to King Huai II, they actually had control over the military in the Chu rebel group.

=== Death ===
The Chu rebel group, under Xiang Liang's leadership, scored some initial victories against Qin forces. In 208 BC, Xiang Liang engaged the Qin general Zhang Han in battle at Dingtao, where he underestimated the enemy and lost his life.

After Xiang Liang's death, King Huai II refused to continue to be a figurehead ruler, so he attempted to seize military power from the Xiangs with support from his adviser Song Yi and others. However, Xiang Yu took Song Yi by surprise in a coup, accused him of treason, and killed him, thereby taking back control over the Chu rebel group's armed forces.

The following year, Xiang Yu defeated Zhang Han at the Battle of Julu, after which Zhang Han, along with 200,000 Qin soldiers, surrendered. Xiang Yu ordered all the surrendered soldiers to be buried alive as a propitiation to his late uncle.
