= Ji (Beijing) =

Ancient city in northern China

Coordinates: 39°53′39″N 116°22′57″E

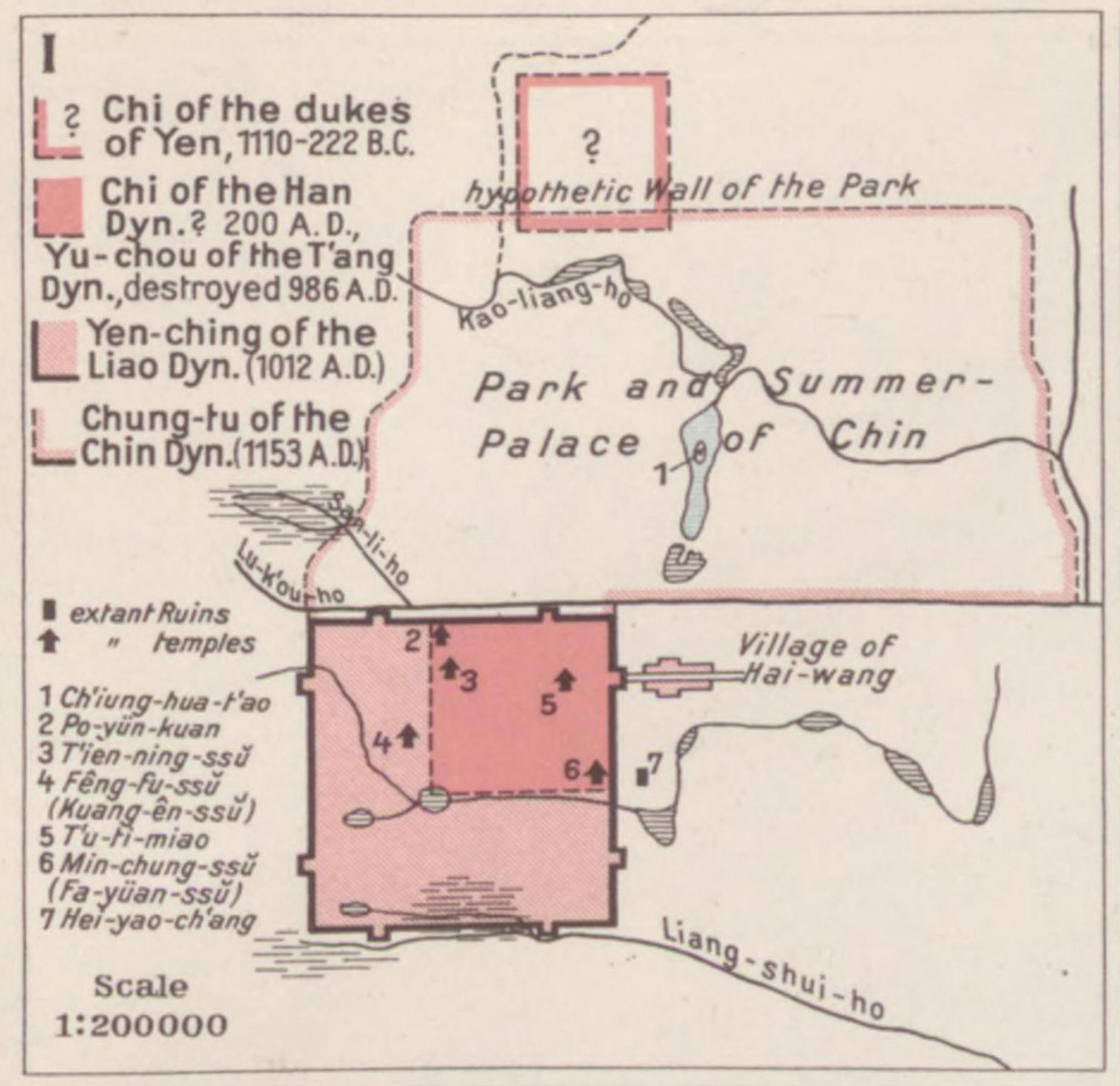
- 1935 map of Zhou and Han Ji ("Chi"); Tang Youzhou ("Yu-chou"); Liao Nanjing ("Yen-ching"); and Jin Zhongdu ("Chung-tu") relative to Beijing's central Bei & Zhongnanhai lakes
- Traditional Chinese: 薊
- Simplified Chinese: 蓟
Transcriptions
Standard Mandarin
- Hanyu Pinyin: Jì
- Wade–Giles: Chi

Jicheng
- Traditional Chinese: 薊城
- Simplified Chinese: 蓟城
- Literal meaning: Ji [Walled] City
Transcriptions
Standard Mandarin
- Hanyu Pinyin: Jìchéng
- Wade–Giles: Chi-ch‘êng

Ji, also known as Jicheng, was an ancient city in northern China, which has become the longest continuously inhabited section of modern Beijing. It has been known by numerous other names over its long history, usually in reference to the changing territories it presided over. Historical mention of Ji dates to the founding of the Zhou dynasty in about 1045 BC. Archaeological finds in southwestern Beijing where Ji was believed to be located date to the Spring and Autumn period (771–476 BC). The city of Ji served as the capital of the ancient states of Ji and Yan until the unification of China by the Qin dynasty in 221 BC. Thereafter, the city was a prefectural capital for Youzhou through the Han dynasty, Three Kingdoms, Western Jin dynasty, Sixteen Kingdoms, Northern Dynasties, and Sui dynasty. With the creation of a Ji Prefecture in present-day Tianjin during the Tang dynasty, the city of Ji became more exclusively referenced as Youzhou or by its subsequent renamings including Yanjing. Youzhou was one of the Sixteen Prefectures ceded to the Khitans during the Five Dynasties. The city then became the southern capital of the Liao dynasty and then the main capital of the Jurchen Jin dynasty. In the 13th century, Kublai Khan built a new capital city for the Yuan dynasty adjacent to Ji to the north. The old city of Ji became a suburb to Khanbaliq/Dadu, whose site was developed under the Ming and Qing dynasties into modern Beijing.

== History ==
=== State of Ji ===
The city-state of Ji was inhabited by the tribe of the Yellow Emperor in the Shang dynasty and became one of the founding vassal states of the Zhou Kingdom. According to Sima Qian's Records of the Grand Historian, King Wu of Zhou, in the 11th year of his term as elder, deposed King Zhou of Shang and conferred titles to nobles within his domain, including the rulers of the city states Ji and Yan. According to the Book of Rites, King Wu of Zhou was so eager to establish his legitimacy after his victory over the Shang at Muye that before dismounting from his chariot, he named the descendants of the Yellow Emperor to the State of Ji. The 11th year of the reign of King Wu of Zhou approximates to 1046 BC. The Beijing Municipal Government designates 1045 BC as the first year of the city's history.

=== State of Yan ===
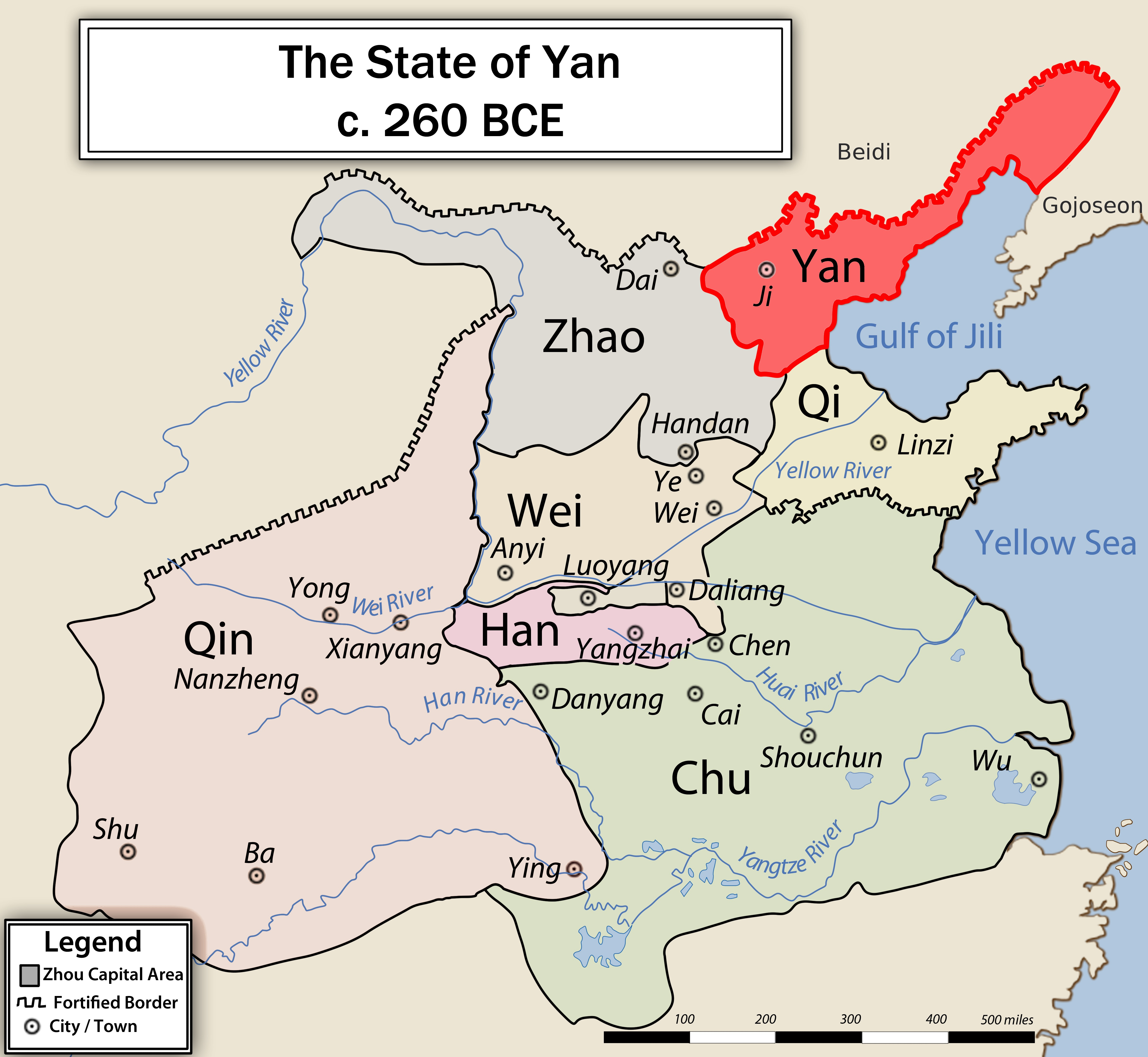
- Ji, marked on a map of the Warring States as the capital of Yan

Shangdu
- Chinese: 上都
- Literal meaning: Upper Capital
Transcriptions
Standard Mandarin
- Hanyu Pinyin: Shàngdū
- Wade–Giles: Shang-tu

At some time in the late Western Zhou dynasty or the early Eastern Zhou dynasty, the neighboring State of Yan conquered Ji and made the city its capital. The Yan state eventually became one of the seven powers of the Warring States period (476–221 BC). The rulers of the Yan built several capitals and moved their seat of power in response to threats from the nomadic tribes from the north and neighboring kingdoms from the south. Ji was referred to historians as Shangdu. Other Yan capitals include: (1) the Liulihe Site in southern Fangshan District of Beijing, which served as the Yan capital prior to Yan's conquest of Ji, (2) Linyi (临易) in present-day Rongcheng and Xiong Counties of Hebei Province to which the seat of Yan moved in 690s BC, (3) the ancient city of Doudian in Liangxiang of Fangshan District, known as Zhongdu (中都), or the "Middle Capital" and (4) Xiadu (下都) or the "Lower Capital", a larger settlement south of Linyi, in modern-day Yi County, Hebei Province, that was built in the 300s BC. By the time the State of Qin invaded Yan in 226 BC, the capital of Yan was back in Ji.

The city of Ji is believed to be located in the southwestern part of present-day urban Beijing, just south of Guang'anmen in Xicheng and Fengtai Districts. Historical accounts mention a "Hill of Ji" northwest of the city, which would correspond to the large mound at the White Cloud Abbey, outside Xibianmen about 4 km north of Guang'anmen. (Note: In 284 BC, the victorious Yan general Yue Yi, having conquered 70 cities of neighboring Qi, wrote to Duke of Yan to report that he had enough booty to fill two palaces and planned to bring home a new tree species to plant on the Hill of Ji, north of the city.) South and west of Guang'anmen, archaeologists have unearthed remnants of concentrated human habitation dating back to at least the 400s BC. In 1956, during the construction of the Yongding River viaduct, 151 ancient wells dating to the Spring and Autumn, Warring States and Han dynasty were discovered. In 1957, a rammed earth platform was found south of Guang'anmen along with tiles used for palace construction. Since then more wells and tiles have been discovered, and the wells are most densely concentrated in south of Xuanwumen and Hepingmen. Archaeologists have yet to discover remnants of city walls from the Zhou dynasty that have been found at the other four capitals. In 1974, excavations around the White Cloud Abbey uncovered remnants of city walls but three tombs from the Eastern Han dynasty found underneath the walls indicate the walls post-date the tombs. The fact that the other four capitals were buried beneath farmland and the Guang'anmen area is a densely populated section of urban Beijing accounts for the greater difficulty of searching for Ji's ruins. In 2008, city authorities in Beijing announced that archaeological efforts would accompany urban renewal constructions projects in southern Beijing to search for more artifacts of Ji in the pre-imperial era.

=== Qin dynasty ===
Guangyang
- Traditional Chinese: 廣陽
- Simplified Chinese: 广阳
- Literal meaning: Expansive Yang
Transcriptions
Standard Mandarin
- Hanyu Pinyin: Guǎngyáng
- Wade–Giles: Kuang-yang

The Qin general Wang Jian conquered Ji in 226 BC and the First Emperor completed his unification of China in 221 BC. The country was organized into 48 commanderies. Ji was the capital of the Guangyang Commandery, whose name it sometimes used. To prevent the Warring States from regaining their power, the First Emperor ordered the walls of the old capitals be destroyed and Ji's walls were torn down in 215 BC but later rebuilt. The Qin removed defensive barriers dividing the Warring States, including the southern wall of the Yan, which separated the Beijing Plain from the Central Plain, and built a national roadway network. Ji served as the junction for the roads connecting the Central Plain with Mongolia and Manchuria. The First Emperor visited Ji in 215 BC and, to protect the frontier from the Xiongnu, had the Qin Great Wall built north of Ji and fortified Juyong Pass. The Qin conscripted men from throughout the country to be garrisoned at the forts north of Ji. In 209 BC, a group of conscripts who were delayed in their march to the north by flooding in central China and faced the penalty of death, rose in rebellion under the leadership of Chen Sheng and Wu Guang. The rebellion spread to Ji, where Han Guang revived the Yan Kingdom. Han Guang sent his subordinate Zang Tu to help rebel leader Xiang Yu, who succeeded in capturing the Qin capital at Xianyang in 207 BC. Xiang Yu then divided the country into Eighteen Principalities, appointing Zang Tu as the lord of Ji and Han Guang as the lord of nearby Liaodong. Han Guang refused to cede Ji to Zang Tu, who seized the city and killed Han Guang. Zang Tu then sided with Liu Bang, the lord of Sichuan, in the war against Xiang Yu. After Liu Bang prevailed and founded the Han dynasty, Zang Tu was appointed the Prince of Yan, and governed the Principality of Yan from Ji.

=== Han and Xin dynasties ===
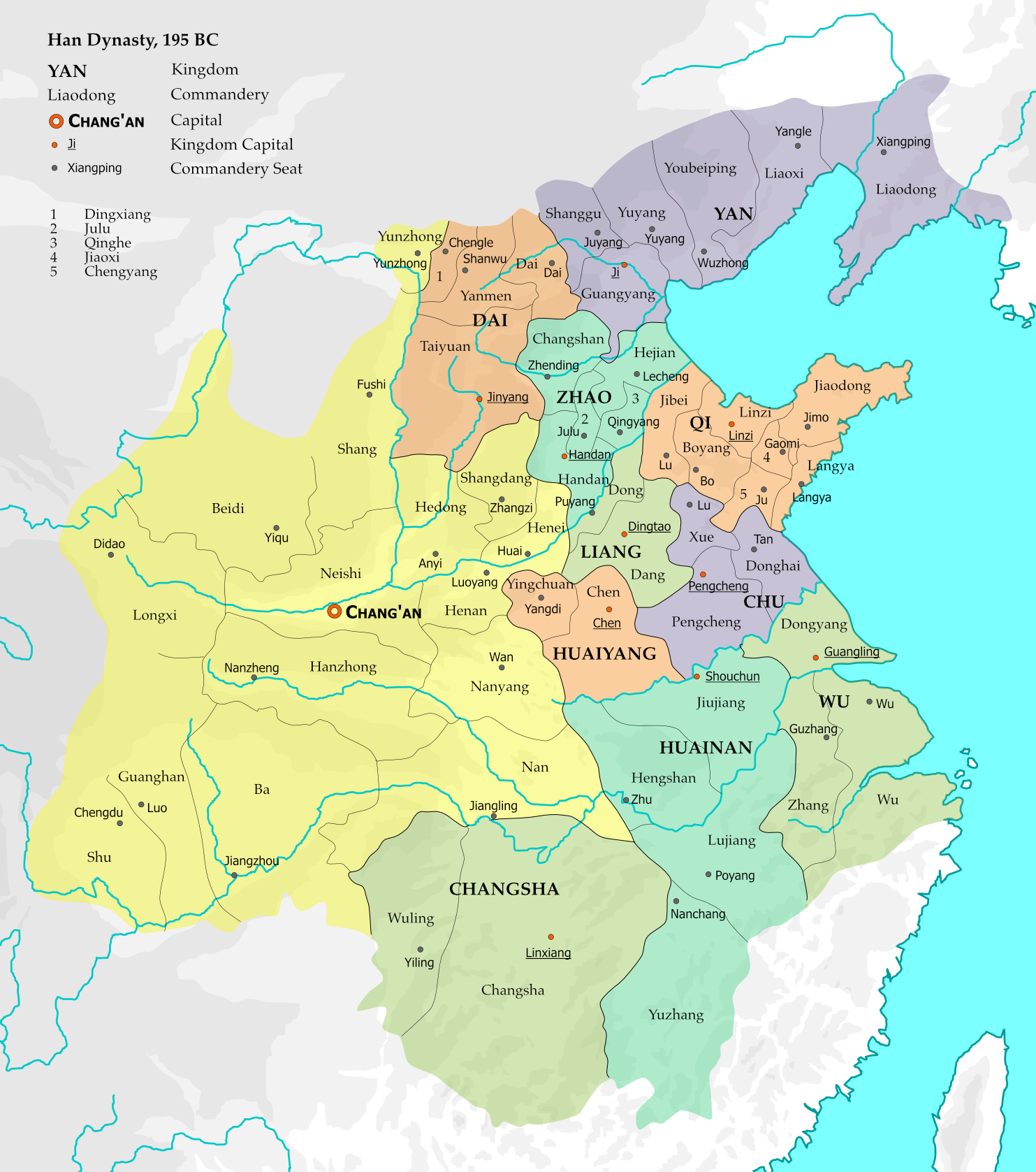
- Principalities of the Han Empire in 195 BC, commanderies under Yan in purple in the northeast

Youzhou
- Chinese: 幽州
- Literal meaning: [Seat of] the Secluded Prefecture
Transcriptions
Standard Mandarin
- Hanyu Pinyin: Yōuzhōu
- Wade–Giles: Yu-chou

Guangyou
- Traditional Chinese: 廣有
- Simplified Chinese: 广有
Transcriptions
Standard Mandarin
- Hanyu Pinyin: Guǎngyǒu
- Wade–Giles: Kuang-yu

Fanyang
- Traditional Chinese: 範陽
- Simplified Chinese: 范阳
Transcriptions
Standard Mandarin
- Hanyu Pinyin: Fànyáng
- Wade–Giles: Fan-yang

When the Han court began to purge former supporters of Xiang Yu, Zang Tu became fearful and rebelled. Liu Bang as the Emperor Gaozu personally led a campaign against Zang Tu in Ji. Zang Tu was defeated and killed in 206 BC. Emperor Gaozu appointed his childhood friend Lu Wan as the Prince of Yan. In 195 BC, he became distrustful of Lu Wan and invaded Ji. Lu Wan fled to the Xiongnu in the steppes. To tighten control of the region, the Emperor Gaozu sent his son Liu Jian to Ji as the Prince of Yan. After Liu Jian died in 181 BC, Gaozu's widow, the Empress Lü Zhi controlled the Han court, and made her nephew Lü Tong as the Prince of Yan. When Empress Lü Zhi's regency ended in 179 BC, Liu Ze became the Prince of Yan and his family ruled Ji for three generations.

In 117 BC, Emperor Wu of Han appointed his son Liu Dan as the Prince of Yan. Liu Dan held the title for 38 years. In 106 BC, Emperor Wu of Han organized the Western Han dynasty into 13 province-sized inspectorates, each overseen by a cishi (刺史) or inspector. The city of Ji was the seat of the Youzhou Inspectorate, which oversaw roughly the same territory as the State of Yan during the Warring States period. Youzhou was composed of the Shanggu, Zhuo, Guangyang, Bohai, Yuyang, Right Beiping, Liaoxi, Liaodong, Xuantu and Lelang Commanderies. After Emperor Wu died, Liu Dan conspired with the Empress Gaichang and Sang Hongyang to subvert the throne. When the plot was foiled, Liu Dan was forced to commit suicide in 80 BC and the Principality of Yan was converted to Guangyang Commandery. In 73 BC, Liu Jian's son, Liu Jian was appointed the Prince of Guangyang and the Guangyang Commandery became the Guangyang Principality. Liu Jian's tomb is now Dabaotai Western Han Dynasty Mausoleum in Fengtai District of Beijing. His grandson Liu Jia was ousted from the principality after Wang Mang's seized the Han throne. During the Wang Mang interregnum, Guangyang Principality became the Guangyou Principality.

During the Eastern Han dynasty, Youzhou was as one of 12 prefectures and contained a dozen subordinate commanderies, including the Guangyang Commandery. In AD 24, Liu Xiu moved Youzhou's prefectural seat from Ji County (in modern-day Tianjin) to the city of Ji. In AD 96, the city of Ji served as the seat of both the Guangyang Commandery and Youzhou.

Near the end of the Eastern Han dynasty, the commander of Fanyang was Liu Yan, better known as the governor of Yizhou Province a few years later. After Liu Yan's reposting, Liu Yu became the commander of Yizhou. His subordinate, Gongsun Zan, eventually attacked Youzhou and killed Liu Yu, becoming the commander of Fanyang.

=== Wei, Jin and Northern dynasties ===
Jixian
- Traditional Chinese: 薊縣
- Simplified Chinese: 蓟县
- Literal meaning: [Seat of] Ji County
Transcriptions
Standard Mandarin
- Hanyu Pinyin: Jìxiàn
- Wade–Giles: Chi-hsien

During the Three Kingdoms, the Kingdom of Wei controlled ten of the Han dynasty's prefectures including Youzhou and its capital Ji. The Wei Kingdom reorganized and decentralized the governance of commanderies under Youzhou. Guangyang Commandery became the State of Yan (燕国), which had four counties: Ji County, Changping, Jundu and Guangyang County, and was governed from the city of Ji. Fanyang Commandery was governed from Zhuo County. Yuyang Commandery was governed from Yuyuang (in modern-day Huairou District of Beijing), Shanggu Commandery was governed from Juyong (in modern-day Yanqing County of Beijing).

The Wei court instituted offices in Youzhou to manage relations with the Wuhuan and Xianbei. To help sustain the troops garrisoned in Youzhou, the governor in AD 250 built the Lilingyan, an irrigation system that greatly improved agricultural output in the plains around Ji.

Ji was demoted to Jixian, a county seat, in the Western Jin dynasty, which made neighboring Zhuo County, in present-day Hebei Province, the prefectural capital of Youzhou. In the early 4th century, the Western Jin dynasty was overthrown by steppe peoples who had settled in northern China and established in a series of mostly short-lived kingdoms. During the so-called Sixteen Kingdoms period, the city of Ji was successively controlled by the Di-led Former Qin, the Jie-led Later Zhao, the Xianbei-led Former Yan and Later Yan.

In 319 AD, Shi Le, the founder of the Later Zhao Kingdom, captured Ji from Duan Pidi, a Xianbei chieftain nominally loyal to the Jin dynasty. In 349, Ran Min, an ethnic Han general seized control of this kingdom, which he renamed Ran Wei in 350. But before he could capture Ji, the city was taken by the Murong Xianbei, led by Prince Murong Jun who swept down from Manchuria. Murong Jun then defeated Ran Min and extinguished the Ran Wei. In 352, he declared himself emperor and made the city the capital of the Former Yan Kingdom. Five years later, the Former Yan's capital was moved further south to Ye in southern Hebei.

In 369–70, the Former Qin, led by Fu Jian, a Di, defeated the Former Yan and briefly unified northern China. But after losing the Battle of Feishui in 383, the Former Qin's control crumbled as the Later Yan, Northern Wei and other kingdoms broke away. In 385, the Northern Yan, under Murong Chui and seized Ji from the Former Qin. At around 398, the Former Yan governor of Ji, Gao Hu, surrendered to the Northern Wei, led by the Tuoba clan of the Xianbei, who established the first of the Northern dynasties. Ji became the prefectural capital of Youzhou. This designation continued through the remainder of the Northern dynasties, Eastern Wei, Northern Qi and Northern Zhou.

=== Sui and Tang dynasties ===
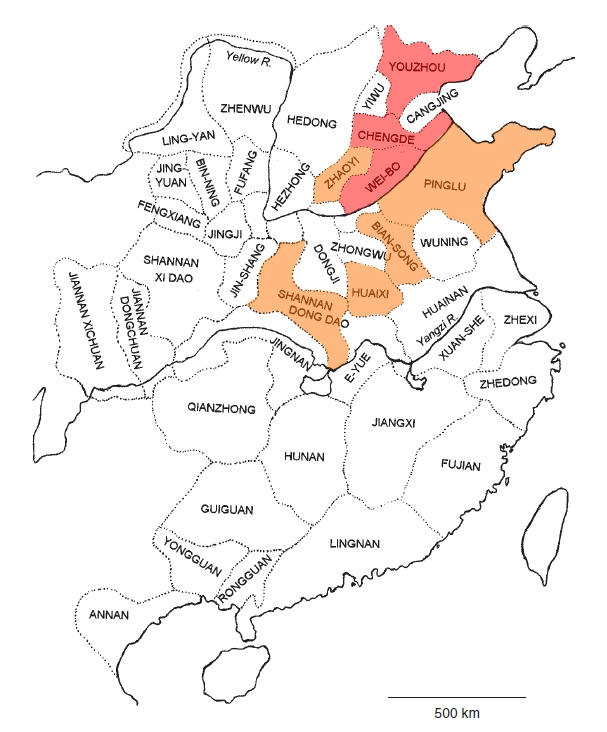
- Provinces of the Tang Empire with those temporarily (orange) and permanently (red) lost after An Lushan's rebellion marked

Zhuojun
- Chinese: 涿郡
Transcriptions
Standard Mandarin
- Hanyu Pinyin: Zhuōjùn
- Wade–Giles: Cho-chün

Yanjing
- Chinese: 燕京
- Literal meaning: Capital of Yan
Transcriptions
Standard Mandarin
- Hanyu Pinyin: Yànjīng
- Wade–Giles: Yen-ching

During the Sui dynasty, Youzhou became Zhuo Commandery and Ji remained the capital of the commandery as Zhuojun. Emperor Yang of Sui mobilized more than million men and women to build the Grand Canal to Zhuojun, to carry men and materiale for his campaigns against Goguryeo. Outside of Ji, the Linshuo Palace was built in 609 to accommodate the emperor during his trips and to and from Korea. The brutal reign of Emperor Yang brought rebellions against the Sui dynasty. One of these, led by Dou Jiande rose from Zhuojun and besieged Ji in 620 but was defeated by Luo Yi, a Sui general who joined Li Yuan's insurrection against the Sui. Li Yuan founded the Tang dynasty.

From the 7th to mid-10th centuries during the Tang and Later Jin dynasties, Fanyang was an important military garrison and a commercial hub. To the north of the city lay the military region of Yingzhou (营州) with Daizhou (代州) to the west.

The Tang dynasty reduced the size of a prefecture, as a unit of administration administrative division, from a province to a commandery and renamed Zhuojun back to Youzhou, which was one of over 300 Tang Prefectures. With the creation of a separate prefecture called Ji (蓟州, Jizhou) in present-day Tianjin in 730, the name Ji was transplanted from Beijing to Tianjin, where a Ji County (蓟县) still exists today. In Beijing, the city of Ji gradually became known as Youzhou.

The seat of the government of Youzhou remained in place but took on slightly different names. In 616, the government was called Youzhou Zongguanfu (幽州总管府); in 622, Youzhou Dazongguanfu (幽州大总管府); in 624, Youzhou Dadudufu (幽州大都督府); and in 626, Youzhou Dudufu (幽州都督府).

In 645, Tang Emperor Taizong launched another war against Goguryeo using Ji as the base of forward operating base. He built the Fayuan Temple in the western suburbs to commemorate the war dead.

From 710, the head of the government in Youzhou became a jiedushi, a regional military commander. In 742, Youzhou was renamed Fanyang Commandery. In 759, during the An–Shi Rebellion, Shi Siming declared himself emperor of the Great Yan dynasty and made Fanyang Yanjing. After the rebellion was suppressed, the seat of government became Youzhou Lulong Dudufu (幽州卢龙都督府).

=== Liao, Jin, and Yuan dynasties ===
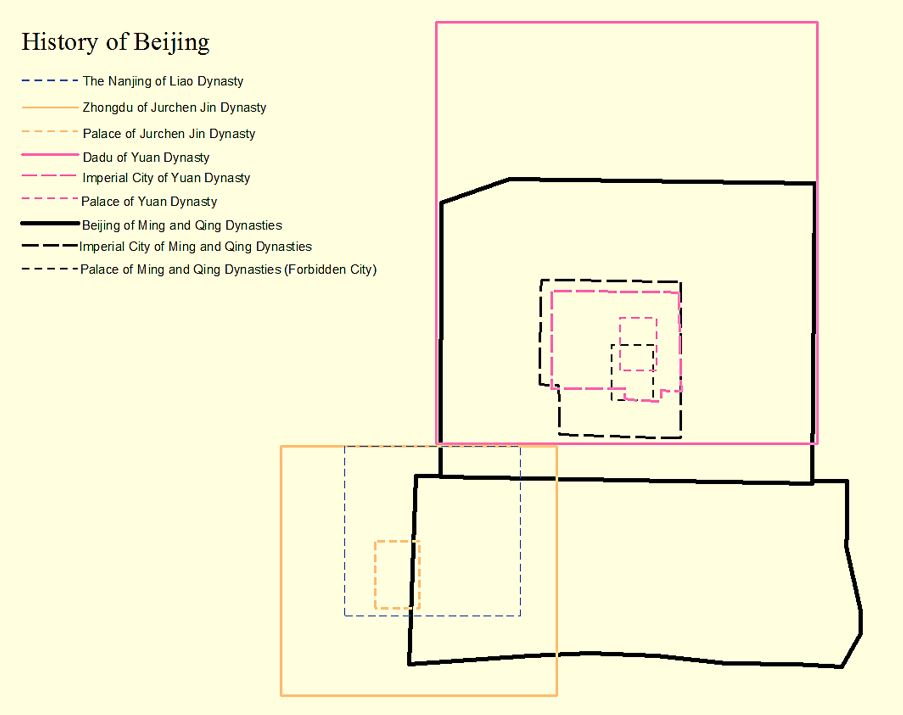
- A map of the outer and inner walls of Liao Nanjing and Jin Zhongdu to the southwest of Yuan Khanbaliq/Dadu and Ming and Qing Beijing

Nanjing
- Chinese: 南京
- Literal meaning: Southern Capital
Transcriptions
Standard Mandarin
- Hanyu Pinyin: Nánjīng
- Wade–Giles: Nan-ching

Zhongdu
- Chinese: 中都
- Literal meaning: Central Capital
Transcriptions
Standard Mandarin
- Hanyu Pinyin: Zhōngdū
- Wade–Giles: Chung-tu

Under the Liao dynasty (907–1125), the city was renamed Nanjing and was the southern capital of Liao. It was also called Yanjing. In the following Jin dynasty (1115–1234), the city was called Zhongdu, the central capital of the Jin. After the Mongols took the city, it was renamed Yanjing. After the Mongols razed it, a new city called Khanbaliq or Dadu was built adjacent to the former Jin capital which was the capital of the Yuan dynasty (1279–1368).

== Modern significance ==
In 2002, the then-Xuanwu District government erected a commemorative pillar in Binhe Park along the western 2nd Ring Road, just south of the Tianning Temple to mark the location of Jicheng and its importance to the history of Beijing. In 2009, the Beijing Administration for Cultural Heritage made the study and discovery of Ji during the Western Zhou, Spring and Autumn, Warring States, Qin and Han eras a priority in the city's archaeological work.

== See also ==
- Western Zhou Yan State Capital Museum at the site of Yan's original capital
- History of Beijing
