= Chen Xi (rebel) =

Chinese rebel leader (died 196 BC)

- Traditional Chinese: 陳豨
- Simplified Chinese: 陈豨
Transcriptions
Standard Mandarin
- Hanyu Pinyin: Chén Xī
- Wade–Giles: Ch‘ên Hsi

Chen Xi (died November or December 196 BC) was a Chinese rebel leader against the first Han emperor Liu Bang (posthumously the "Emperor Gaozu" or "High Ancestor").

== Life ==
The approximate borders of the Han Empire in 195 BC, the year after Chen Xi's rebellion was quelled. The vassal or princely states of Dai, Zhao, and Yan lie to the north and northeast.

Chen Xi came from Yuanqu, a former city in what is now Longwangmiao Village in the Mudan District of Heze, Shandong. His early life and circumstances are not recorded, but Liu Bang came to place great trust in him and his abilities. The Chu king Xiang Yu defeated Zhang Han at Julu (within present-day Pingxiang County, Xingtai, Hebei) in 207 BC, effectively ending the Qin Empire. Chen joined Liu with 500 conscripts the next year, pledging his loyalty at the beginning of the internecine wars that became known as the Chu–Han Contention. Chen held Bashang (霸上, Bàshàng) near present-day Xi'an (Chang'an) and was named Liu's "Guerrilla General" (t 游擊將軍, s 游击将军, Yóují Jiāngjūn). The 202 BC Battle of Gaixia (near Suzhou in Anhui) ended the conflict in Liu Bang's favor, and he declared the beginning of the Han dynasty.

Some of the other kings of the Chinese states chafed at the restoration of imperial rule. Zang Tu had been named king of Yan by Xiang Yu, secured his title by removing its previous occupant Han Guang by force, and been confirmed in Yan and Liaodong by Liu Bang. Before the end of 202 BC, however, he rebelled against the new empire and invaded its central northern commanderies, collectively known as "Dai" from a former kingdom of that name, which lay to his west in what is now northern Hebei and Shanxi. Chen Xi resisted Zang in Dai and helped the emperor's push into Yan, where Zang Tu was captured, executed, and replaced with the emperor's long-time comrade Lu Wan.

The next year in 201 BC, the Xiongnu nomads—who may have been allied with Zang, although this is not recorded—invaded Dai and forced the surrender of Han Xin, a former king of Han who had been moved into the north by the emperor and opted to make his capital at the exposed frontier town of Mayi (present-day Shuozhou in northern Shanxi) instead of at Jinying (present-day Taiyuan). Despite his long support of Liu Bang, Han came under suspicion of revolt and concluded an alliance with the Xiongnu chanyu Modu to protect himself. Learning of this arrangement, the emperor marched north in 200 BC and defeated Han Xin in battle; Han was able, however, to escape into exile among the nomads; and the Xiongnu were able to defeat Liu Bang's invasion of their lands at Baideng near present-day Datong. Chen again served with distinction during this campaign, though the details are not noted in his biographies.

For his service in either the Yan or Dai campaigns (the attribution varies in different chapters of the Records of the Grand Historian), Chen Xi was enfeoffed as Marquis of Yangxia (t 陽夏侯, s 阳夏侯, Yángxià Hóu) and named a "ranking" marquis (列侯, lièhóu) rather than the usual grade.

In 198 BC, King Ao of Zhao was discovered to be plotting against the emperor. As he was married to the emperor's eldest daughter Princess Yuan, he was not executed but demoted to marquis status. The emperor's son Prince Ruyi was named to succeed him as king of Zhao, and in 197 BC Chen Xi was sent from Chang'an to act as chancellor for the young boy's realm. He was given control of most of the Han army defending what is now Shanxi and Hebei against the Xiongnu nomads to their north.

Imperial envoys sent to monitor the new chancellor apparently implicated him and his officials in a range of illegal activities, which Chen discovered. From his exile among the Xiongnu, Han Xin dispatched Wang Huang (t 王黃, s 王黄, Wáng Huáng) and Manqiu Chen (曼丘臣, Mànqiū Chén) to convince Chen that he now had no choice but to rebel or be executed. In May 197 BC, the death of the emperor's father brought Chen a summons to return to Chang'an to pay his respects, which he did not honor. At some time before the end of the year, (Note: The precise dating of the revolt varies in different volumes of the Records of the Grand Historian. It probably occurred in the 9th lunar month of the 10th year of Liu Bang's reign (25 Sept.–23 Oct. 197 BC).) Chen himself joined Wang Huang and other rebels against the Han, declaring himself the independent "king of Dai" at Julu (within present-day Pingxiang County, Xingtai, Hebei). Chen Xi's descent into treason prompted Sima Qian to exclaim in an aside from his historical narrative, "Alas, how tragic!"

The next month, the emperor personally led an army against Chen from the southwest, while Lu Wan, the king of Yan and the emperor's childhood friend, led his army against Chen from the northeast. Liu Bang was satisfied when he reached Zhao's natural and traditional stronghold at Handan, which was well protected against armies from the south by the course of the Zhang River; as Chen's forces had not rushed to secure and fortify it ahead of the invasion, neither he nor his advisors could be expected to do well in the coming campaign. Chen's men had occupied four-fifths of the 25 cities of Changshan, but the emperor declined Zhou Chang's suggestion that he punish the towns' governors for failure to withstand the northern army under Chen's command; instead, he accepted that their garrisons had been insufficient to offer meaningful resistance. When the emperor discovered that some of Chen's supporters were former merchants, he encamped at Handan and was able to persuade many to surrender or change sides by offering large bribes.

Chen sent Wang Huang to Modu, the chanyu of the Xiongnu to his north, to seek help from the nomads. For his part, the king of Yan sent Zhang Sheng (t 張勝, s 张胜, Zhāng Shèng) to convince the Xiongnu that Chen's rebellion stood no chance of success and that they should refrain from involving themselves. En route, however, Zhang met Zang Yan (臧衍, Zāng Yǎn) whose father Zang Tu had been the previous king of Yan before his execution by the Han emperor. Zang was able to convince him that the emperor would only permit independent states like Yan for as long as they were useful for suppressing others' rebellions; once the country was at peace, the imperial clan would begin dismantling them and executing their royal houses for treason, whether deserved or not. Zhang took this to heart and negotiated with the Xiongnu to assist Chen. Upon hearing this, Lu Wan initially planned to execute Zhang and his entire family for treason; Zhang, however, was able to return and explain himself, convincing his king that supporting Chen was in his family's own interest. Lu then returned Zhang as his ambassador to the Xiongnu court and sent Fan Qi (t 范齊, s 范齐, Fàn Qí) as an ambassador to Chen's court, pledging Yan's support for his cause. When he discovered how few soldiers he was receiving from Yan and his other vassals, the emperor angrily took four men at random from those milling around Handan and barked, "You fools, do you think you can lead an army for me?" When they knelt awkwardly and silently, he named them generals and provided each one with the tax revenue from a thousand households. When his other commanders protested at the unfairness of this action to men who had served him loyally for years without any such reward, he complained again of the fickleness of his vassals—all of whom had been his comrades in the wars against Qin or Chu—and admonished them that he would need to depend on the local people of the north to defeat Chen's insurrection.

In January 196 BC, a commoner came before Empress Lü at the Han capital Chang'an to plead for the life of his brother, a servant of Han Xin, a general and former king of Qi and Chu who had remained behind during the call to arms because of a grave illness. The servant had offended his master in some way that caused Han to imprison him and threaten him with execution. The brother then told the empress that Han Xin's illness was entirely feigned and that he was secretly in league with Chen Xi's rebellion, having plotted with him the year before while they were both in the capital together. Han was waiting for some message from Chen, whereupon he would forge an imperial pardon for everyone held in the prisons of Chang'an; in the ensuing chaos, he supposedly planned to attack the empress and the crown prince, seizing control of the city. The empress consulted the imperial chancellor Xiao He, who feigned a message of his own that the emperor had defeated and killed Chen Xi, ending the rebellion. Such good news required that nobles in the capital, no matter how ill, should visit the palace to offer congratulations; when Xiao He persuaded Han Xin to do so, he was arrested and executed, along with his family.

In the field, the year began with Chen Xi's general Wang Huang and his thousand cavalry at Quni (present-day Shunping County, Hebei); Hou Chang (侯敞, Hóu Chǎng) raiding the countryside with a force of around ten thousand men; and Zhang Chun (t 張春, s 张春, Zhāng Chūn) crossing the Yellow River with a similar force in order to attack Liaocheng. From Handan, the emperor dispatched forces under his general Guo Meng (郭蒙, Guō Méng) and the army of the princely state of Qi under its chancellor Cao Shen. Together, they defeated and executed Zhang at Liaocheng and Wang below Quni; Guan Ying was responsible for capturing and executing Hou in the same engagement. The emperor's cousin Liu Ze (t 劉澤, s 刘泽, Liú Zé) also participated in these battles, for which he was created Marquis of Yingling. The emperor led a siege of Dingyuan (now Zhengding, Hebei). Its governor Zhao Li held out more than a month, with some of his defenders lampooning the emperor from the battlements; upon the town's surrender, Liu Bang—still incensed—offered amnesty for all the rebels provided that they bring him the comics in their midst for execution. (Note: One of the accounts of this even in the Records of the Grand Historian avers that the survivors were not fully pardoned but were still required to be tattooed as criminals.) Following this victory, he named his son Liu Heng (later posthumously known as the "Wen" or "Literary Emperor") as the legitimate King or Prince of Dai.

His eastern forces fully defeated, Chen Xi seems to have fled west into what is now northern Shanxi, where he was joined by Zhao Li and by Han Xin, the former king of Han. The emperor was said to have defeated their combined forces at Loufan near present-day Ningwu. Zhou Bo then led a separate force past Taiyuan to Mayi (present-day Shuozhou) at the edge of the steppe. When it did not submit to his authority as an agent of the Han Empire, he assaulted and sacked the town. At one of these battles or sometime before the end of the year, Han Xin was finally killed.

In late 196 BC, the emperor led his army against Ying Bu while sending Fan Kuai to attack Chen Xi. One captive taken by Fan Kuai told him of Fan Qi's presence at Chen's court; other Xiongnu captives reported Zhang's continued residence with Modu. The emperor then directed Fan Kuai to lead his army against Yan, and Lu fled in exile to the Xiongnu, dying in 194 BC.
