= Yuyang Commandery =

Chinese imperial commandery from the Qin to Tang dynasties

Yuyang Commandery (Chinese: 漁陽郡) was a commandery in imperial China from Qin dynasty to Tang dynasty. It was located in present-day Hebei province as well as Beijing and Tianjin municipalities.

The commandery was established by the state of Yan, and was so named because of its location to the north of the Yu River (now Chaobai River). The commandery was situated on the empire's northern frontier and played a major role in Qin and Han dynasties' defense against the Xiongnu and other northern peoples. In western Han dynasty, the commandery administered 12 counties, including Yuyang, Hunu (狐奴), Lu (路), Yongnu (雍奴), Quanzhou (泉州), Pinggu (平谷), Anle (安樂), Tixi (厗奚), Guangping (獷平), Yaoyang (要陽), Baitan (白檀) and Huayan (滑鹽), the last 3 of which were abolished during the eastern Han dynasty. The total number of households was 68,802 in 2 AD, while the population was 264,416. In 140 AD, the population was 435,740, and the households numbered 68,456. In Jin dynasty, the commandery was abolished and its land were incorporated into the Principality of Yan (燕國).

Yuyang Commandery was reestablished in Northern Wei from the former territories of Yuyang and Beiping Commanderies, with the seat at Lu (in present-day Beijing). It administered 6 counties, and the Book of Wei documented 6,984 households and a population of 29,670. The commandery was abolished in early Sui dynasty.

In Tang dynasty, Yuyang became an alternative name for Ji Prefecture (薊州). The seat was now in modern Ji County, Tianjin, while Lu County became part of You Prefecture (幽州), also known as Fanyang Commandery (范陽郡), in 627.

== See also ==
- History of Beijing
- Jicheng (Beijing)
