= Nanjing (Liao dynasty) =

Southern capital of the Liao dynasty

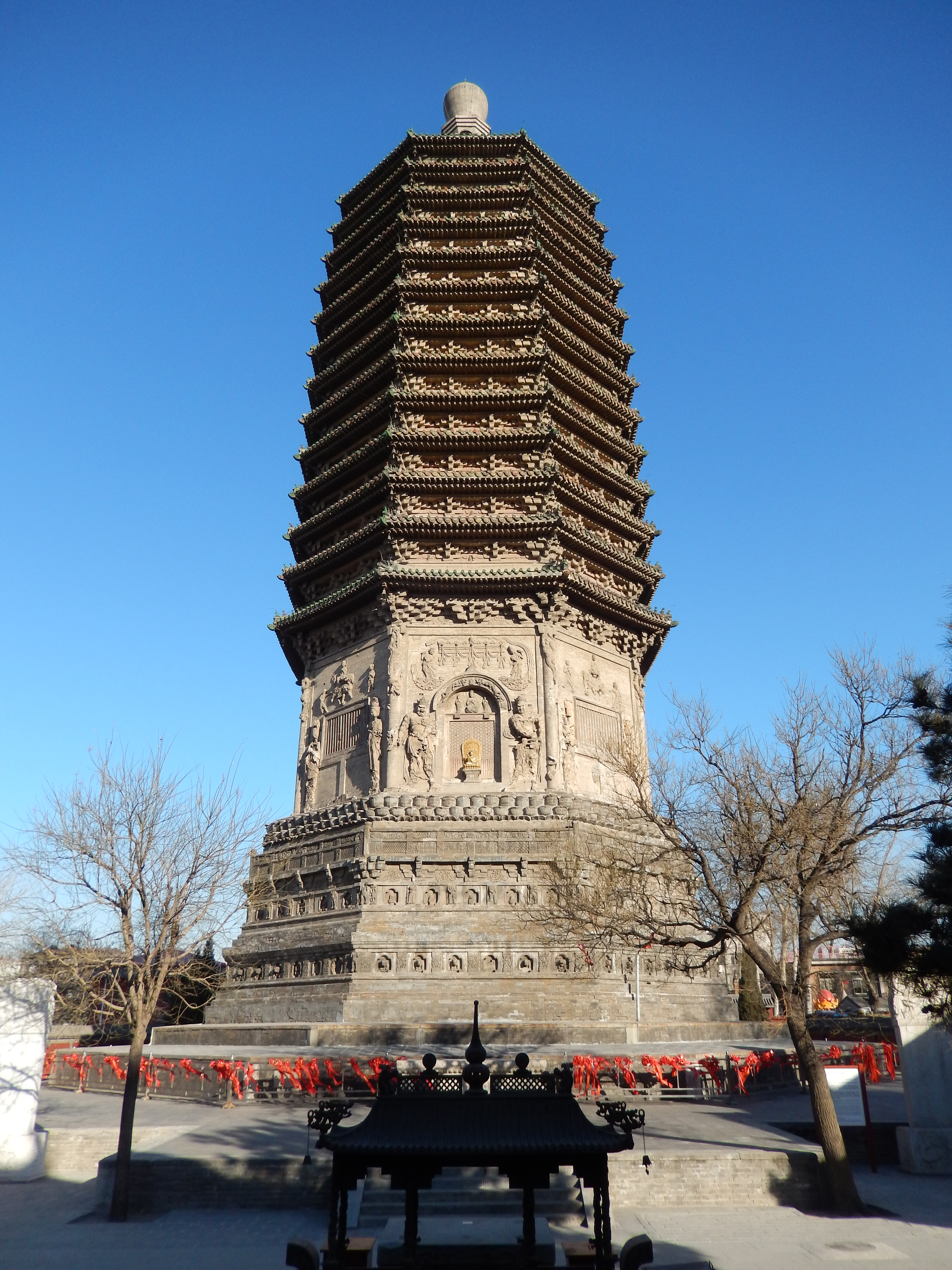
The Tianning Temple Pagoda was built in Liao Nanjing in 1120.

Nanjing was the name for modern Beijing during the Khitan-led Liao dynasty of China, during which it served as the empire's southern capital. To distinguish "Nanjing" (literally 'southern capital') from the modern city of Nanjing in Jiangsu, and Beijing Damingfu, the name for modern Daming County in Hebei Province during the Northern Song dynasty, Chinese historians sometimes refer to Liao-era Beijing as Liao Nanjing (辽南京; 遼南京). The Liao acquired the city, then known as Youzhou, in the cession of the Sixteen Prefectures in 938 by the Later Jin, one of the five short-lived dynasties that ruled northern China following the end of the Tang dynasty. The city was officially renamed "Nanjing, Youdu Fu" (南京幽都府). In 1012, the city was renamed "Nanjing, Xijin Fu" (南京析津府). The city was also colloquially referred to at the time as "Yanjing". In 1122, the city was captured by the Jurchen-led Jin dynasty (1115–1234)—who officially renamed it "Yanjing", ending the use of "Nanjing" for what is today modern Beijing.

== Location and orientation ==
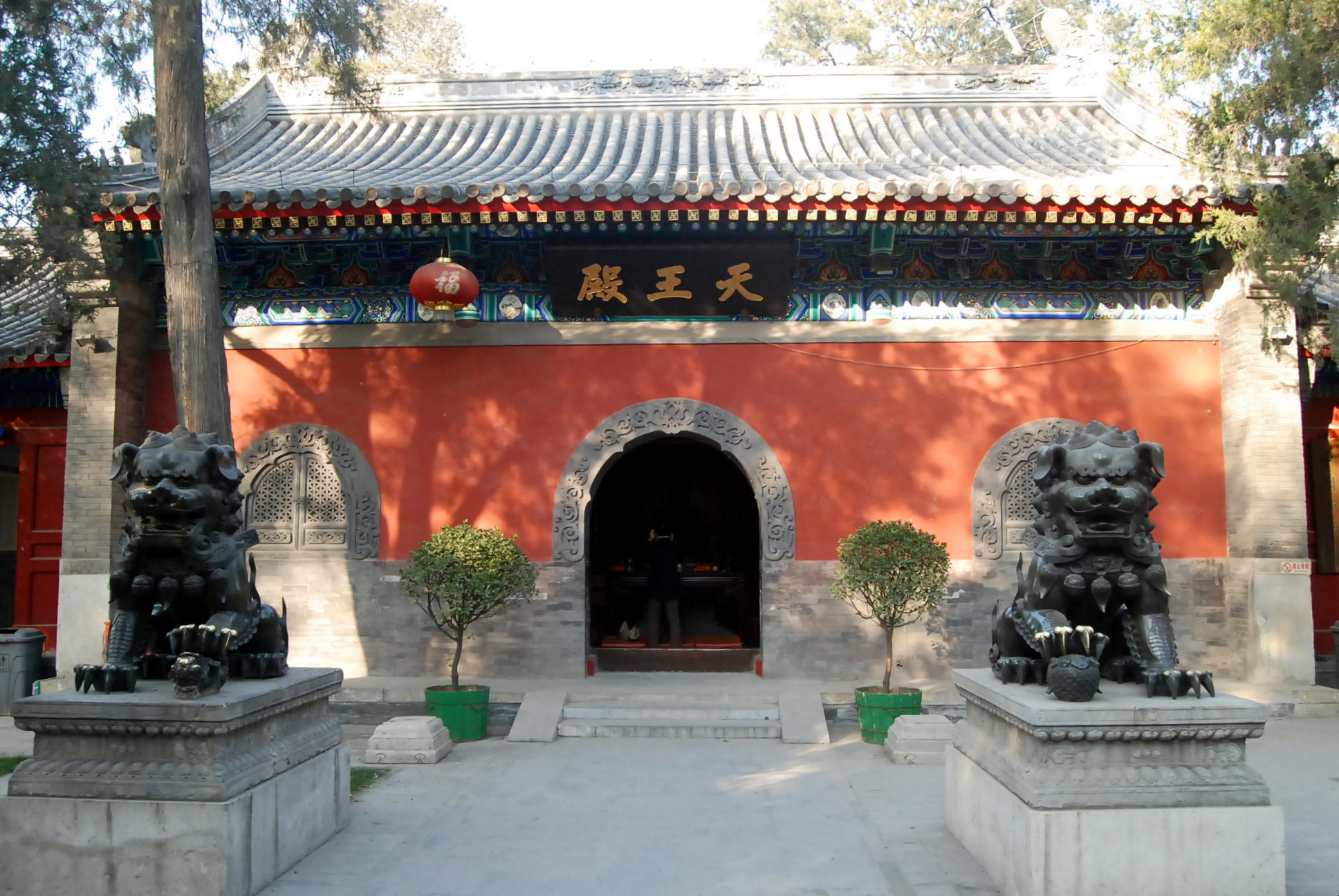
The Hall of the Kings of Heaven inside the Fayuan Temple in Xicheng District. The temple was known as the Minzhong Temple and was located east of Nanjing's imperial city.

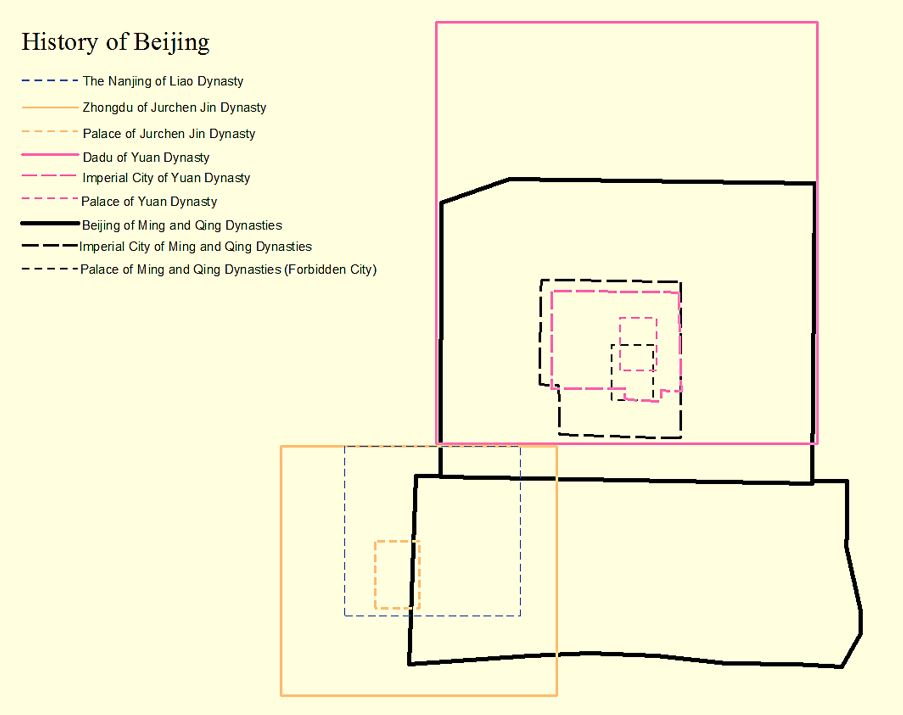
Map showing the change of the city walls in Beijing throughout Liao, Jurchen Jin, Yuan, Ming and Qing dynasties.

Liao Nanjing is located in the southwestern portion of modern Beijing, in the southern half of Xicheng District, which from 1952 to 2010 was known as Xuanwu District).

=== Outer walled city ===
Liao Nanjing inherited the walled city and neighborhood configuration of Youzhou from the earlier Tang dynasty. The outer city wall was 36 li in circumference, though some scholars say it was closer to 25-27 li, 9 meters high and 4.5 meters wide at the top. The city had eight gates (men), two each in each cardinal direction: Andongmen and Yingchunmen to the east, Kaiyangmen and Danfengmen to the south, Xianximen and Qingpumen to the west, and Tongtianmen and Gongchenmen to the north. On top of the wall were 910 battle towers. Outside the wall were three layers of moats. Outside Danfengmen was the jiju grounds, where Khitan nobles played an ancient form of polo.

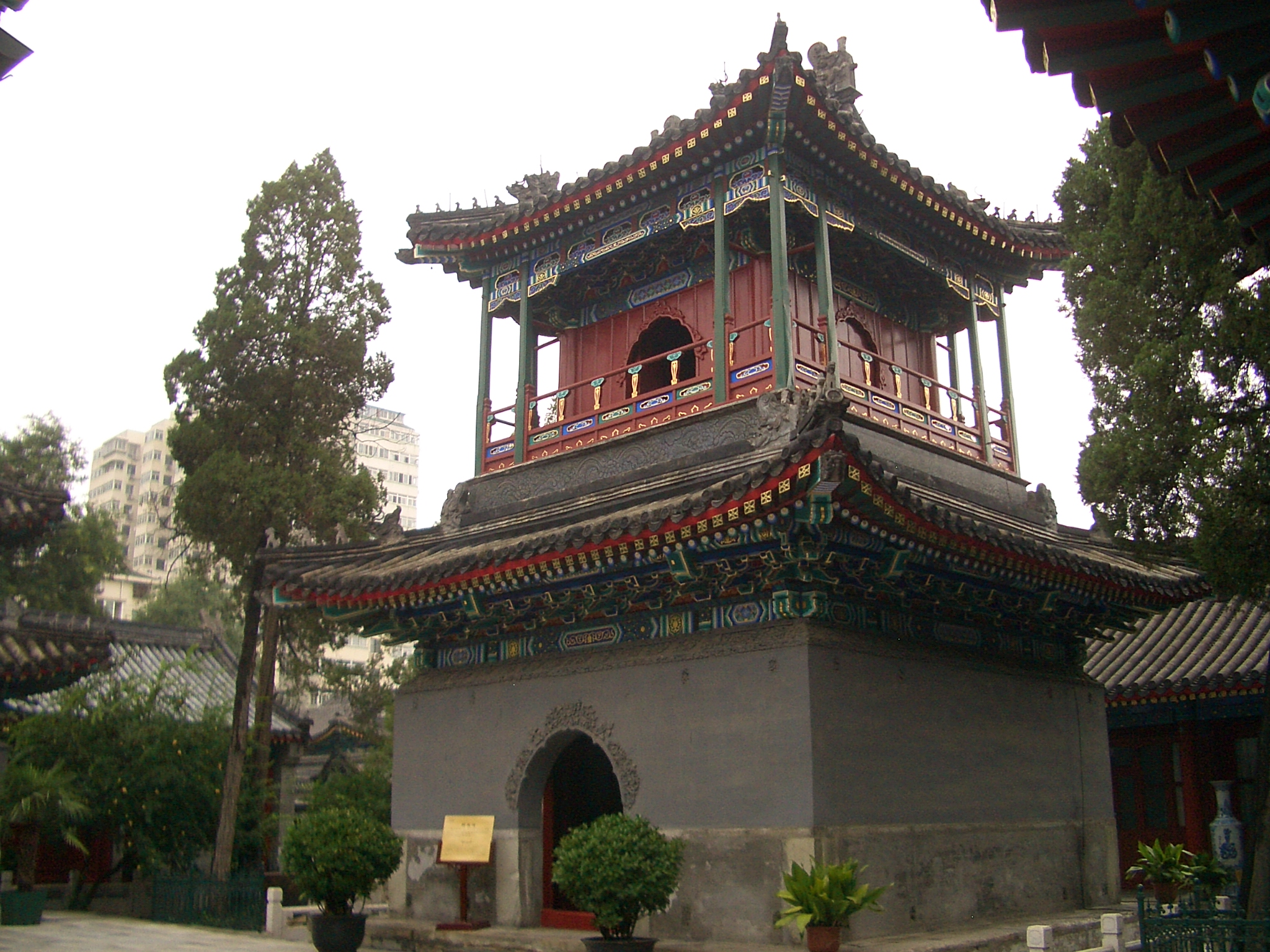
A minaret in the Niujie Mosque, founded in 996, is now the oldest mosque in Beijing.

Inside the southwest corner of the outer walled city was a rectangular inner walled city, which during the Tang era served as the headquarters of the Lulong commander. The Liao converted this inner city into a walled imperial place, which had four gates. To the south and west, imperial walled city shared gates with the outer walled city, Xianximen and Danfengmen. The north gate of the imperial city was Yabeimen and east gate was Xuanhemen. In keeping with Khitan tradition which orients toward the east, the main gate of the imperial city was Xuanhemen. On top of the Xuanhemen was the Pavilion of Five Phoenix (Wufenglou). From the pavilion, the Khitan ruler could gaze out at the cityscape to the east. Outside of this gate was the Minzhong Temple, now the Fayuan Temple, the oldest in Beijing.

The north wall stretched from the modern day White Cloud Temple east along Toufa Hutong (Hair Lane). Shoushui Hutong, the lane adjacent to Toufa Hutong to the north, once called the Stinking Water River, was likely Liao Nanjing's moat. The east wall was situated just west of Lanman Hutong, which was itself the eastern moat. The Fayuan Temple, some 200 meters west of Lanman Hutong, was encompassed inside the wall. A stone tablet near Caishikou marks the location of Andongmen, the north gate in the east wall. The south wall was located roughly along modern-day Baizhifang Street. A stone tablet at the intersection of Baizhifang Street and You'anmen Inner Street marks the site of Kaiyangmen, the east gate in the south wall. The west wall extended from the White Cloud Temple to the Xiaohongmiao neighborhood, to the east of the Lianhua River, which functioned as the west moat.

Liao Nanjing retained the 26 neighborhood division of the Tang city. The major markets were to the northern part of the city.

=== Imperial city ===
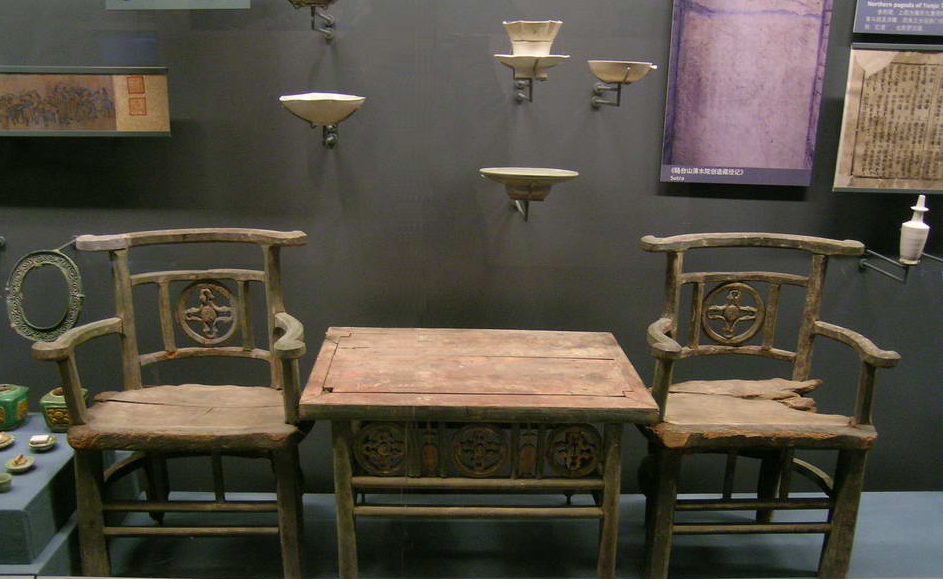
Liao-era furniture from the uncovered in Fangshan District.

Inside the imperial city was the palace complex, which in keeping with Han Chinese tradition, faced the south. The palace complex, like the later Forbidden City, had two internal gates facing the south, Xuanjiaomen and Nanduanmen (which were renamed, respectively, Yuanhemen and Qixiamen in 1006). To the east and west were the Zuoyemen and Youyemen, which were renamed Wanchunmen and Qianqiumen in 1006.

The palace was located on the same site where Shi Siming had built his palace when he declared himself emperor in 759, during the An-Shi Rebellion. Halls in the palace include the Yurong, Xuanhe, Danei and Yongping.

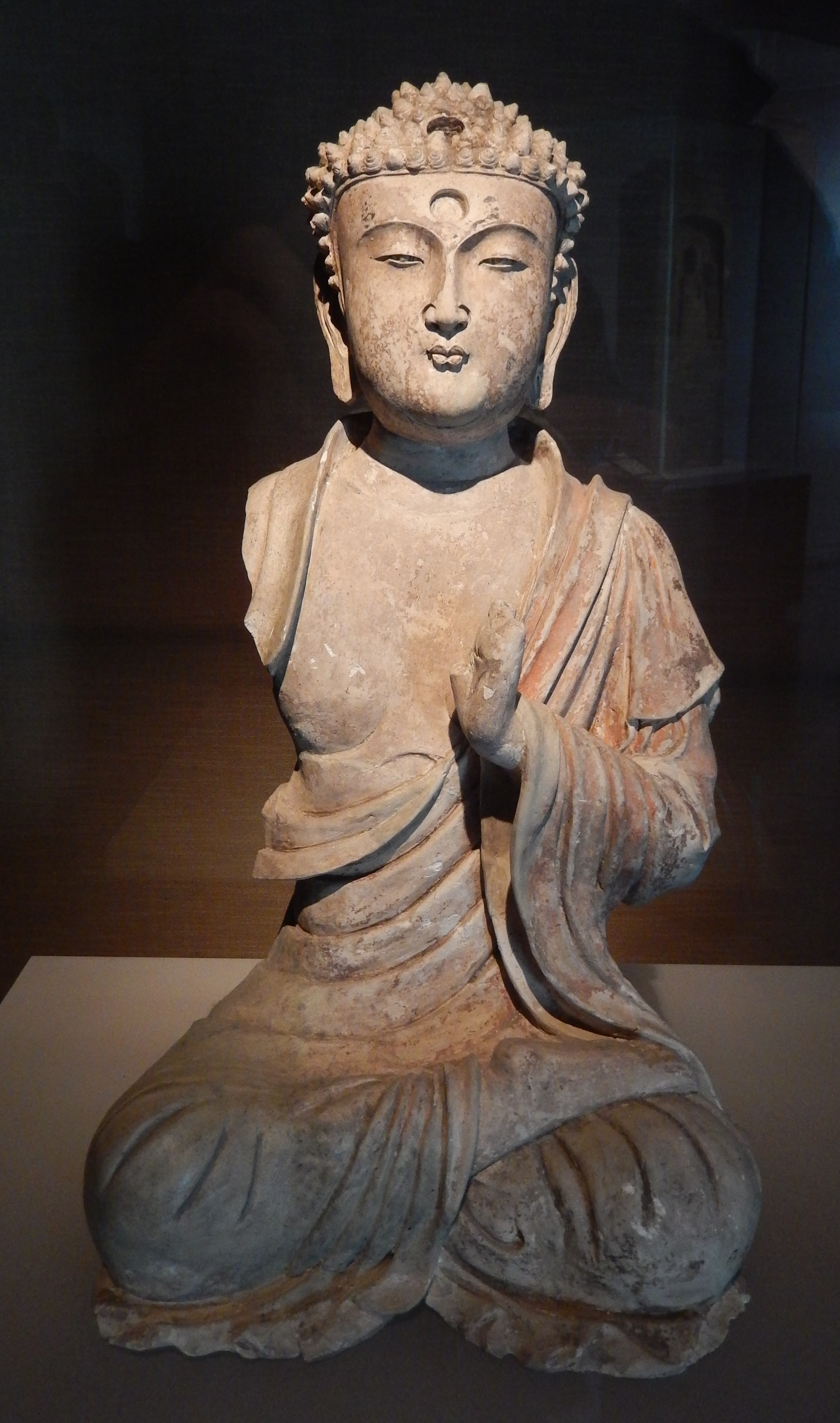

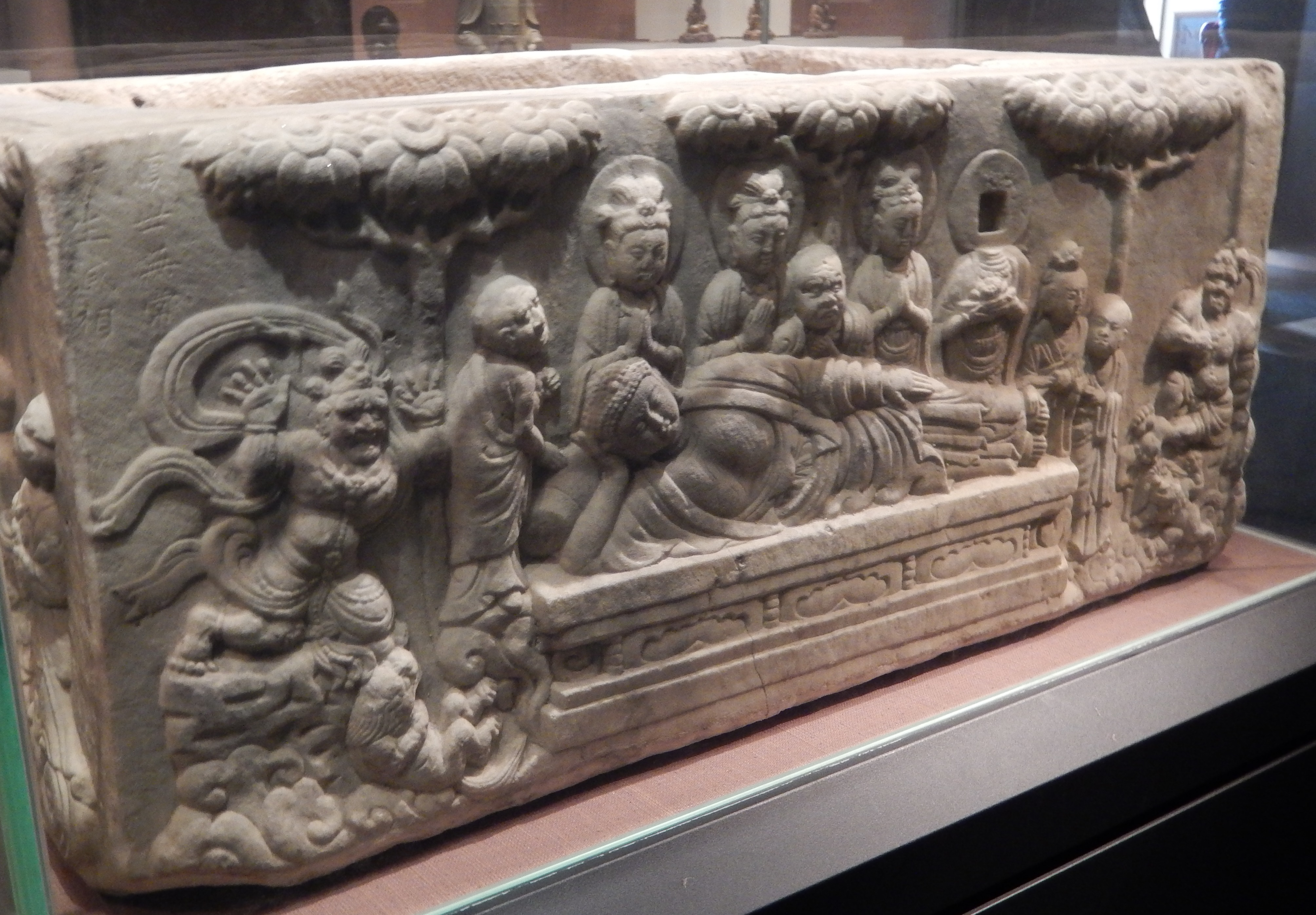
Left: Liao dynasty polychrome statue of Sakyamuni from the Mentougou Museum, on loan to the Capital Museum. Above: A stone chest for storing śarīra (Buddhist relics), unearthed in Chaoyang District, now in the Capital Museum.

=== Houses of worship ===
The city had numerous temples including the Minzhong, Yanshou and Wutian. Among those that survive to this day are the Minzhong Temple, now known as the Fayuan Temple, the oldest Buddhist Temple in Beijing; the Tianning Temple whose pagoda, built in the Liao era, is among the oldest buildings standing in Beijing; the Daoist White Cloud Temple; and the Niujie Mosque, founded in 996 by Nazaruddin, an Arab resident, and now the oldest mosque in Beijing.

== History ==
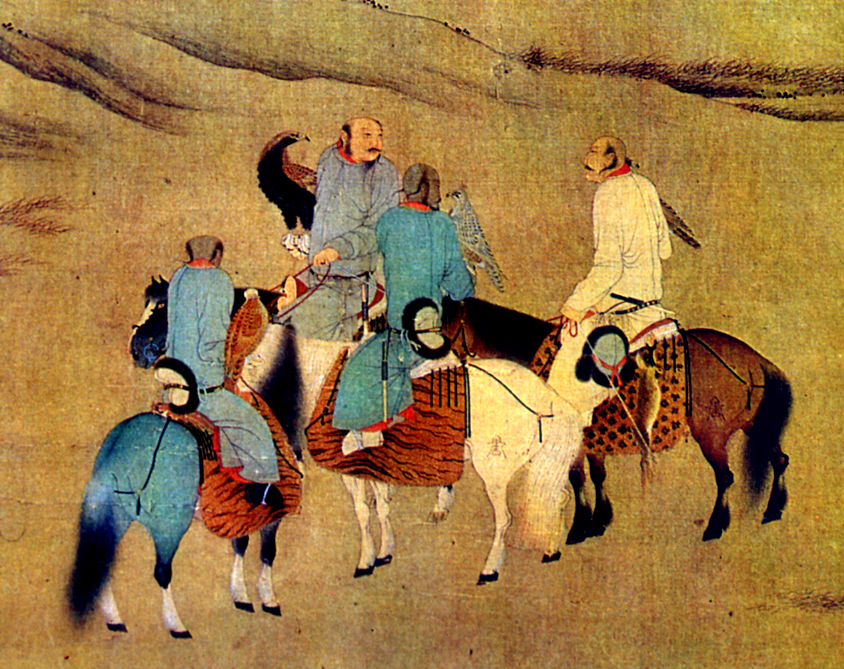
The Khitans were a nomadic people from Inner Mongolia. Painting of Khitan hunters by Hu Gui from the Five Dynasties.

Prior to its cession to the Liao in 938, Youzhou had been regional center in northern China for two millennia. The city, known in earlier eras as Ji, was the capital of the ancient states of Ji and Yan, and became under the Tang dynasty an important military command to guard the northern frontier against the Khitan and Xi. After the fall of the Tang in 907, the Khitan leader Yelü Abaoji declared himself emperor in Shangjing (modern-day Baarin Left Banner, Inner Mongolia) in 918 and began to expand southward. In 936, his son, Yelü Deguang renamed their dynasty, Liao, and in 938 helped Shi Jingtang, a Shatuo Turk general overthrow the Later Tang dynasty and found the Later Jìn dynasty. In exchange for Liao military assistance, Shi Jingtang ceded the Sixteen Prefectures along the Great Wall to the Liao. The Liao then made the two principal cities acquired, Youzhou (modern Beijing) and Yunzhou (modern Datong), the Southern and Western Capitals of its growing empire. Liao Nanjing administered the empire's Southern Circuit, which includes predominantly ethnic Han territory south of the Taihang Mountains.

Under Liao rule, the population inside the walled city grew from 22,000 in 938 to 150,000 in 1113 (and the population of the surrounding region grew from 100,000 to 583,000) as large numbers of Khitan, Xi, Shiwei and Balhae from the north and Han from the south migrated to the city. (Note: Until the late Qing dynasty, the imperial census of the various dynasties counted only the number of taxable households in each administrative jurisdiction. To arrive at actual population figures, historical demographers have had to estimate the household size of each district in each era and add in the number of untaxed individuals, including imperial staff, religious personages and military personnel. Han Guanghui's 1996 compilation of historical census figures for Beijing provides two estimates for the city’s population during each period: (1) the population within the walled city and (2) the population of the surrounding region that correspond, approximately, to the extent of modern Beijing Municipality.)

=== War and peace with the Song ===
After unifying most of China proper in 960, the Song dynasty sought to recapture the lost northern territories. In 979, the Song emperor Taizong personally led a military expedition that reached and laid siege to Nanjing (Youzhou) but was defeated in the decisive Battle of Gaoliang River, north of the city. In 1004, the Song and Liao signed the Treaty of Chanyuan, and remained at peace for more than a century.

=== Fall of Liao Nanjing ===
In 1120, the Song entered the Alliance on the Sea with the Jin dynasty (1115-1234) of the Jurchens, a semi-agricultural, forest-dwelling people living northeast of the Liao in modern-day northeast China. The Song and Jin agreed to jointly invade the Liao and split captured territories, with most of the Sixteen Prefectures going to the Song. Under the leadership of Wanyan Aguda, the founder of the Jin dynasty, the Jurchens captured in rapid succession, Shangjing, Zhongjing and Dongjing, the Liao's Upper, Central and Eastern Capitals.

Relics in the Capital Museum unearthed in the suburbs of Beijing
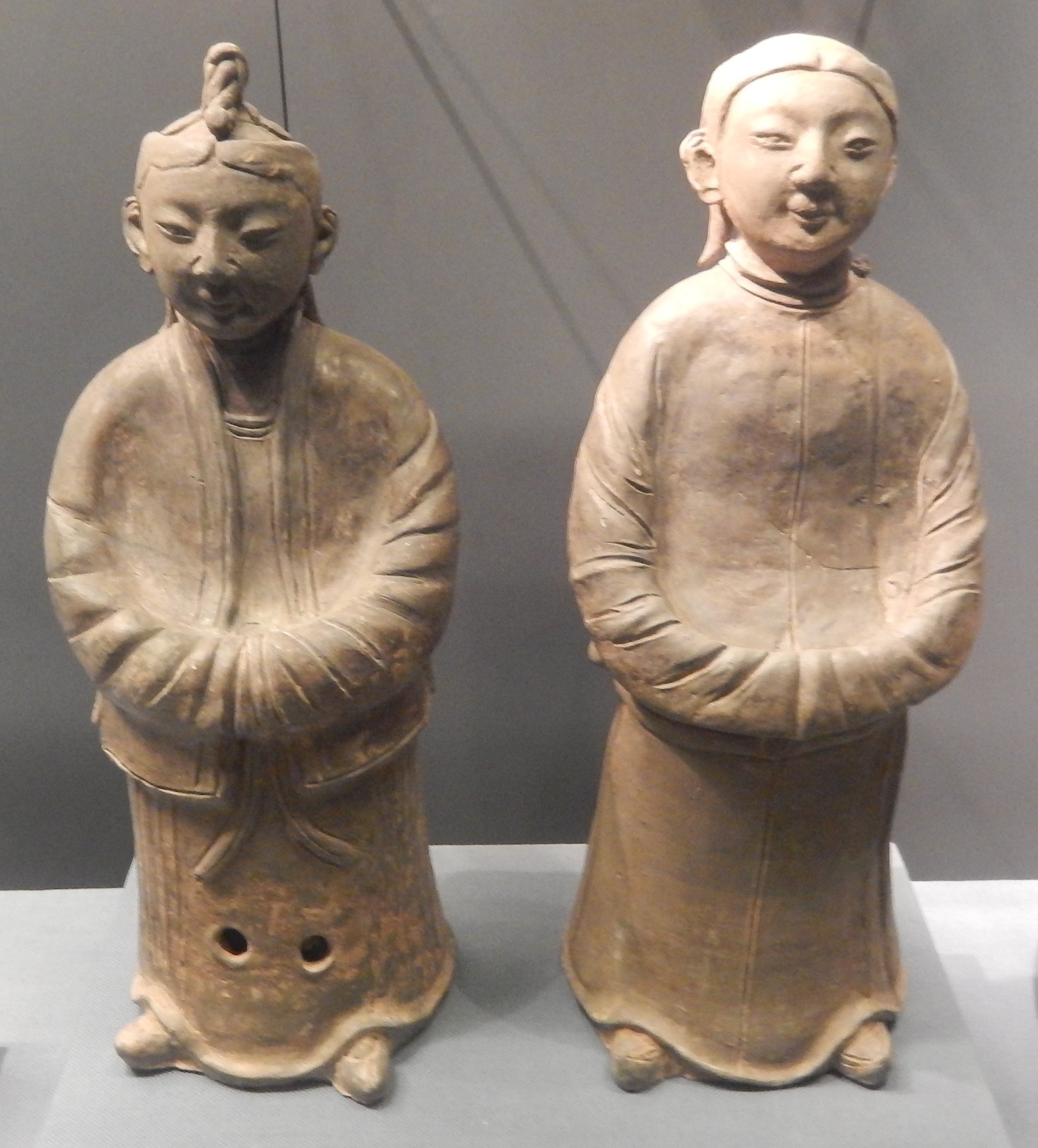
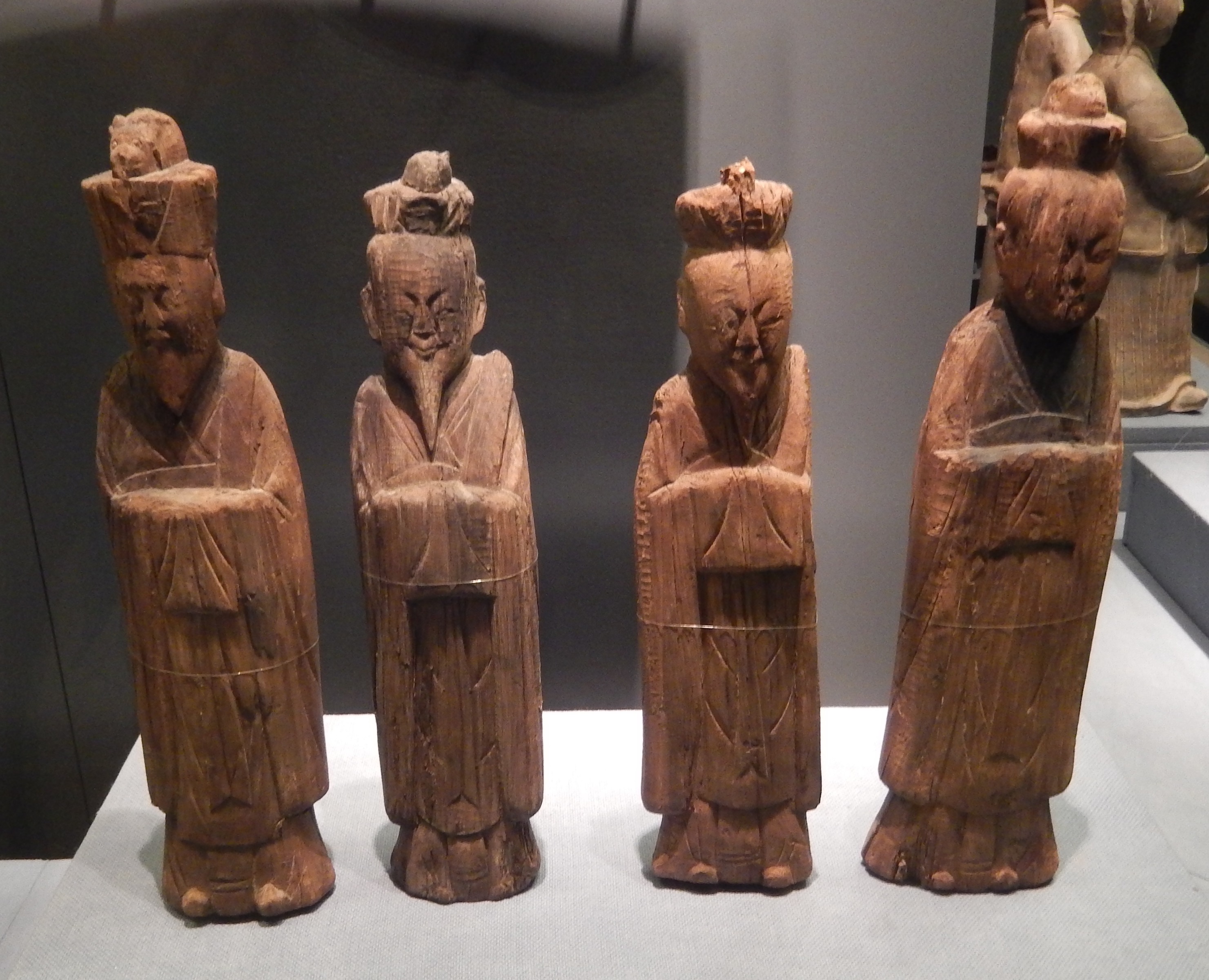
Left: Pottery funerary figurines of two Khitan male servants, unearthed in Chenzhuang, Changping District. Right: Liao-era wooden funerary figurines representing four of the twelve zodiac animals, unearthed in 1979 from the tomb of Ma Zhiwen in Daxing District.

In the spring of 1122, the Liao court rallied around Prince Yelü Chun and made him emperor in Nanjing. Yelü Chun rebuffed the Song appeals to surrender. In May, the Song commander Tong Guan sent two armies to capture Nanjing, but Zhong Shidao's eastern army was defeated by Yelü Dashi at Baigou (in Rongcheng County, Hebei) and Xin Xingzong's western army was driven back by Xiao Gan at Fancun (in modern Zhuozhou, Hebei).

After Yelü Chun died of illness in the early summer, the Empress Dowager Xiao Defei assumed leadership, and Tong Guan sent Liu Yanqing to attack Nanjing in September with 150,000 troops. Gao Feng and Guo Yaoshi, the Liao commanders of Yizhou and Zhuozhou surrendered their respective cities. Guo Yaoshi then led the vanguard of the Song Army in a raid on Nanjing. He sent subordinate Zhen Wuchen with fifty soldiers dressed as city residents to seize and open the Yingchunmen. Guo Yaoshi and the rest of the raiders entered the city, seized the Minzhong Temple and then managed to control seven of the city's eight gates. Empress Xiao refused to surrender or flee. She sent for reinforcements and continued to resist from the imperial city, firing arrows from atop Xuanhemen. After three days of street fighting, Xiao Gan's Four Armies, so called because it consisted of armies of Khitan, Xi, Han and Balhae troops, reached the city, ahead of the main Song Army. They slipped into the city through the Danfengmen, the only gate of the outer walled city not controlled by the Song troops. According to Song battlefield accounts, that gate was not open to the public and overlooked by the raiders. Xiao Gan's reinforcements then emerged from the north and east gates of the imperial city and surprised Guo Yaoshi's who were busy looting while waiting for the main Song Army to arrive. After heavy fighting in the markets in the north of the city, the Song raiders were defeated and trapped. Guo Yaoshi fled by lowering himself from the city wall. Of the 7,000 Song raiders who attacked the city, only 400 managed to escape. Xiao Gan then routed Liu Yanqing's main Song Army.

In the winter of 1122, the Jin Army drove through the Juyong Pass and marched on Nanjing from the north. This time, Empress Xiao fled to the steppes and the remaining Liao officials capitulated. Wanyan Aguda allowed the surrendering officials to retain their positions and encouraged refugees to return to the city, which was renamed Yanjing.

=== Song Yanshan ===
In the spring of 1123, Wanyan Aguda agreed, as per treaty terms, to hand Yanjing and four other prefectures to the Song in exchange for tribute. The handover occurred after the Jurchens had looted the city's wealth and forced all officials and craftsman to move to the Jin capital at Shangjing (near present-day Harbin). Thus, the Song, having failed to take the city militarily from the Khitans, managed to purchase Yanjing from the Jurchens. Song rule of the city, renamed Yanshan (燕山), was short-lived.

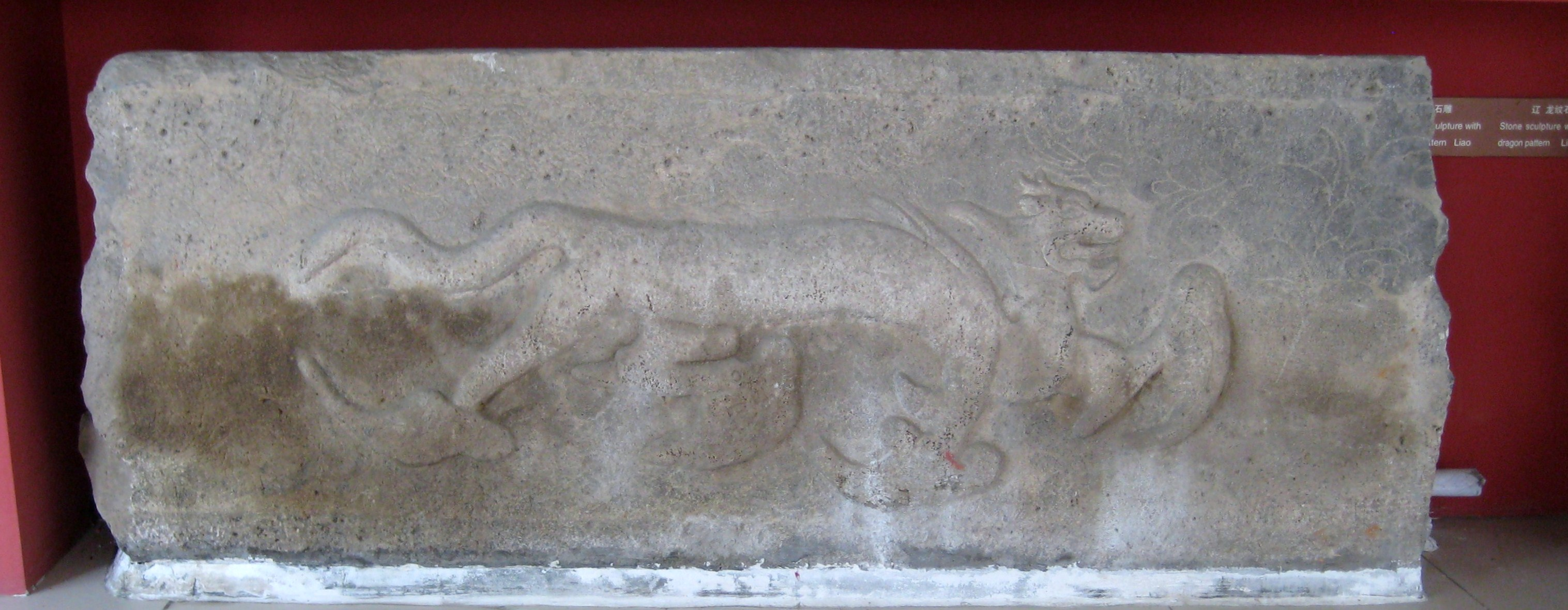

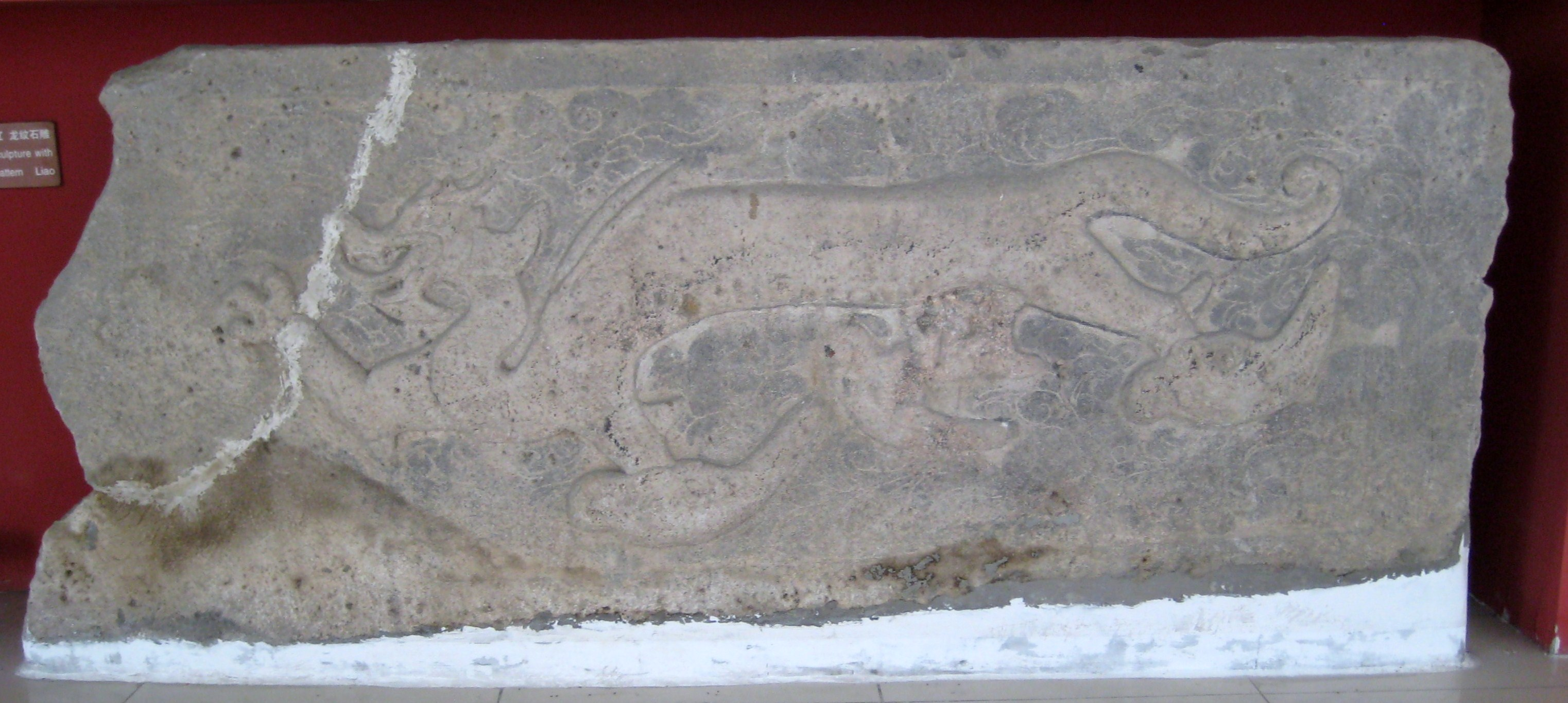
Liao era relief sculptures of dragon (above) and tiger (below) in the Beijing Liao and Jin City Wall Museum.

As the convoy of relocated Nanjing residents passed Pingzhou (near Qinhuangdao) on their way to the Northeast, they persuaded the governor Zhang Jue to restore them to their home town. Zhang Jue, a former Liao official who had surrendered to the Jin dynasty, then switched his allegiance to the Song. The Song Emperor Huizong welcomed his defection, ignoring warnings from his diplomats that the Jurchens would regard the acceptance of defectors as a breach of treaty terms. Zhang Jue was defeated by the Jurchens, and took refuge with Guo Yaoshi at Yanshan. The Song court had Zhang Jue executed to satisfy Jin demands, much to the alarm of Guo Yaoshi and other former Liao officials serving the Song. The Jurchens, sensing Song weakness, used the Zhang Jue incident as a pretext to invade. In 1125, Jin forces defeated Guo Yaoshi at the Battle of the Bai River, on the upper reaches of the Chaobai River in modern Miyun County. Guo Yaoshi then surrendered Yanshan and then guided the Jin's rapid advance on the Song capital, Kaifeng, where the Song Emperor was captured in 1127, ending the Northern Song dynasty. Yanshan was renamed Yanjing.

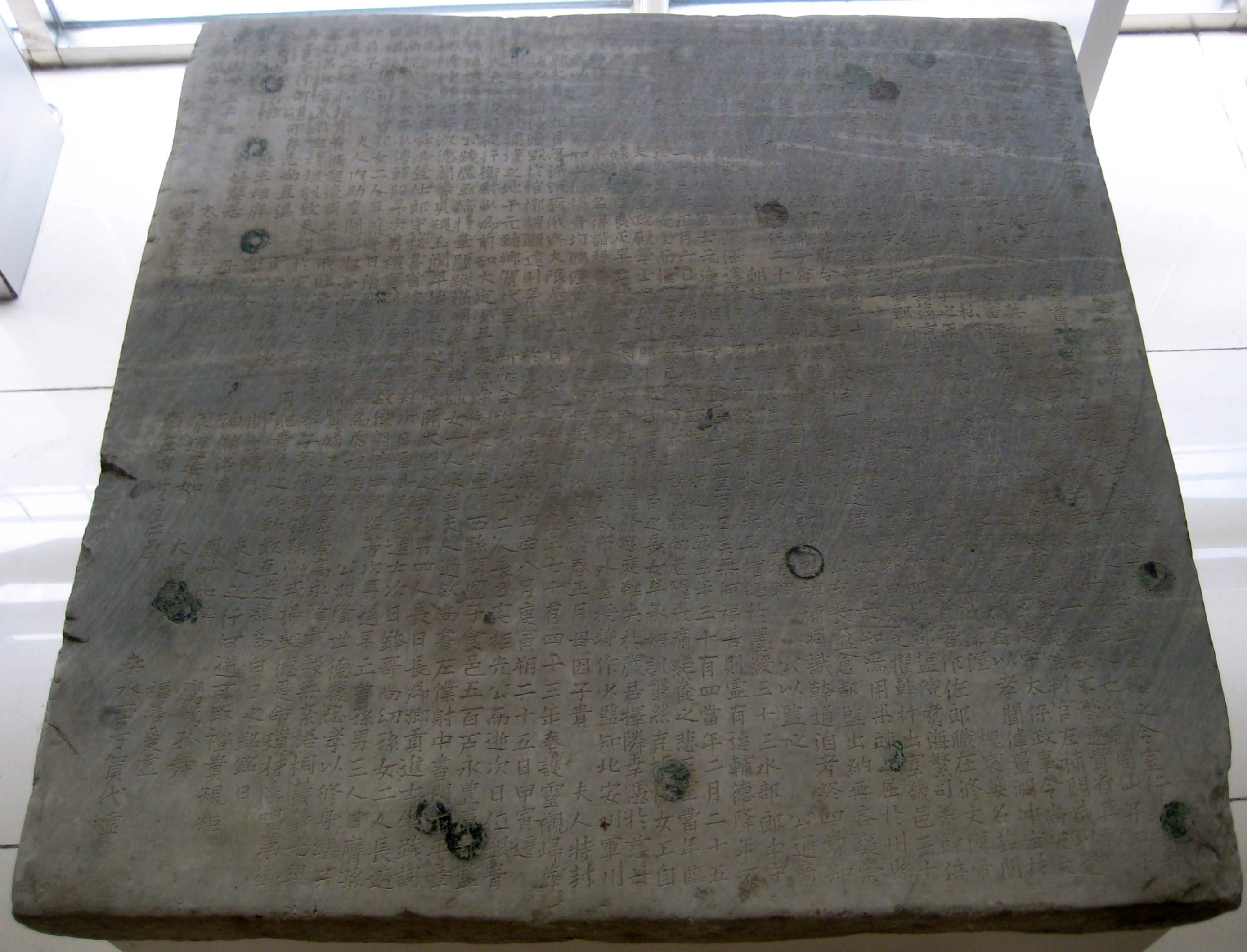
A Liao-era memorial tablet found in the tomb of Li Jicheng, an official in Nanjing, and his wife. The tablet was unearthed in Fengtai District in 2002.

== Conversion into Jin Zhongdu ==
In 1151, the Jin dynasty moved its capital from Shangjing to Yanjing, renaming the city, Zhongdu. The Jurchens expanded the city to the west, east and south. Liao Nanjing's northern wall was extended to the east and west with Tongtianmen renamed Tongxuanmen and Gongchenmen renamed Chongzhimen. Danfengmen, which was a gate in the southern wall of Liao Nanjing and its imperial city, became the southern gate of Zhongdu's imperial city, and renamed Xuanyangmen.

== See also ==
- History of Beijing
- Youzhou
- Zhongdu
- Khanbaliq
