= Western Zhou Yan State Capital Museum =

- 琉璃河遗址
- Established: 1995
- Location: Beijing
- Coordinates: 39°36′55″N 116°03′00″E
- Type: Archaeological site, History museum
- Public transit access: Public Bus

The Western Zhou Yan State Capital Museum (Chinese: 西周燕都遗址博物馆) is an archaeological museum in southwestern Beijing Municipality at the site of the capital of the ancient State of Yan during the Western Zhou dynasty. The site is located in Dongjialin Village, just north of Liulihe Township (琉璃河镇), in Fangshan District, 43 km (27 mi) south of Beijing's city centre. During the Western Zhou dynasty, over 3,000 years ago, the walled settlement at Liulihe, as the site is also known, served as the capital of the Yan, a vassal state of the Zhou dynasty. The discovery of the site in 1962 is considered to be one of the 100 major archaeological discoveries in China during the 20th century. Artifacts from the site including engraved bronze ware and chariots provide the earliest archaeological evidence of urban settlement in Beijing Municipality. The museum at the site, operated by the municipal government, opened in 1995.

== The Liulihe Site ==
Bronzeware unearthed at the Liulihe Site now on display at the Beijing Capital Museum
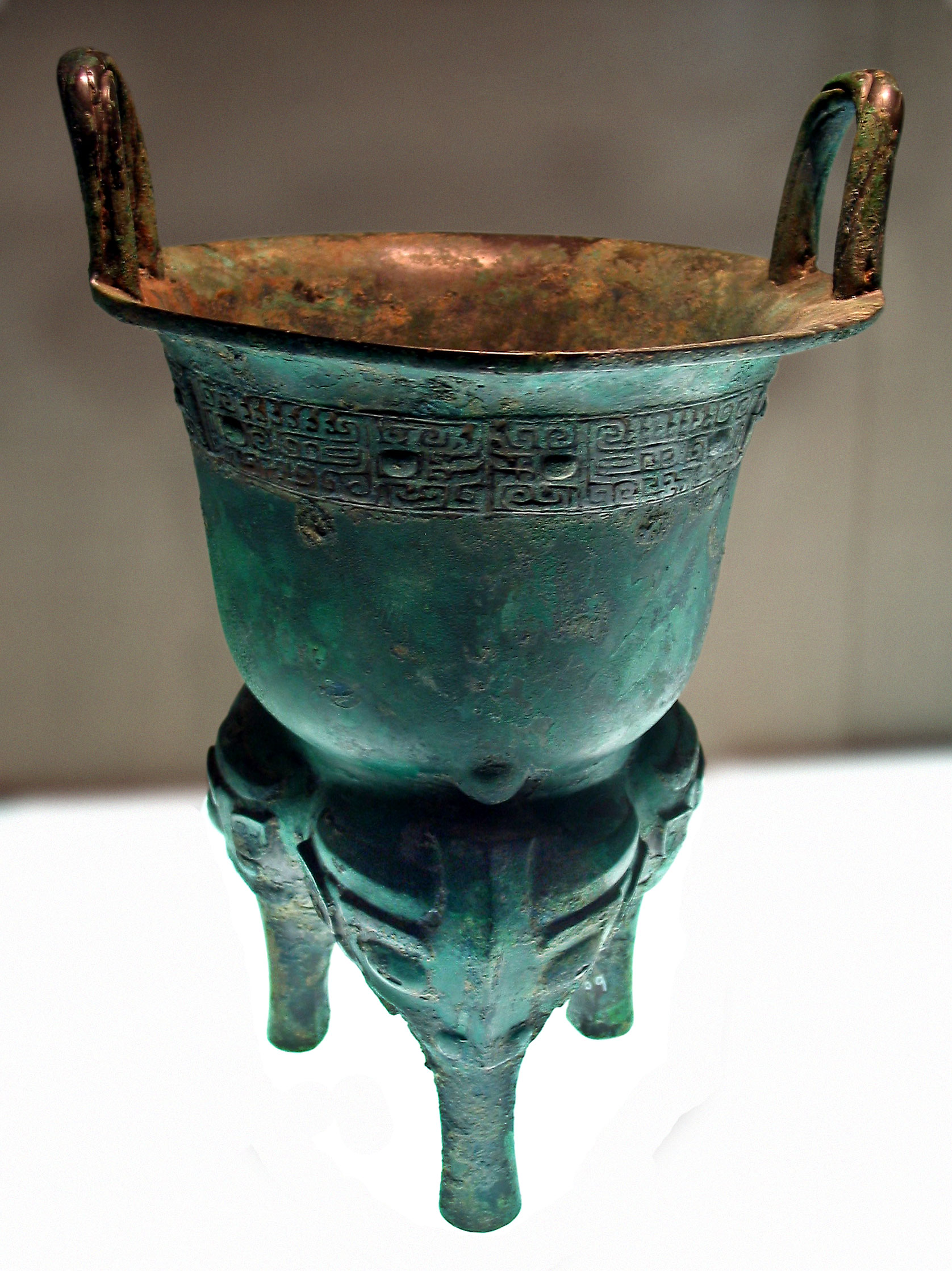
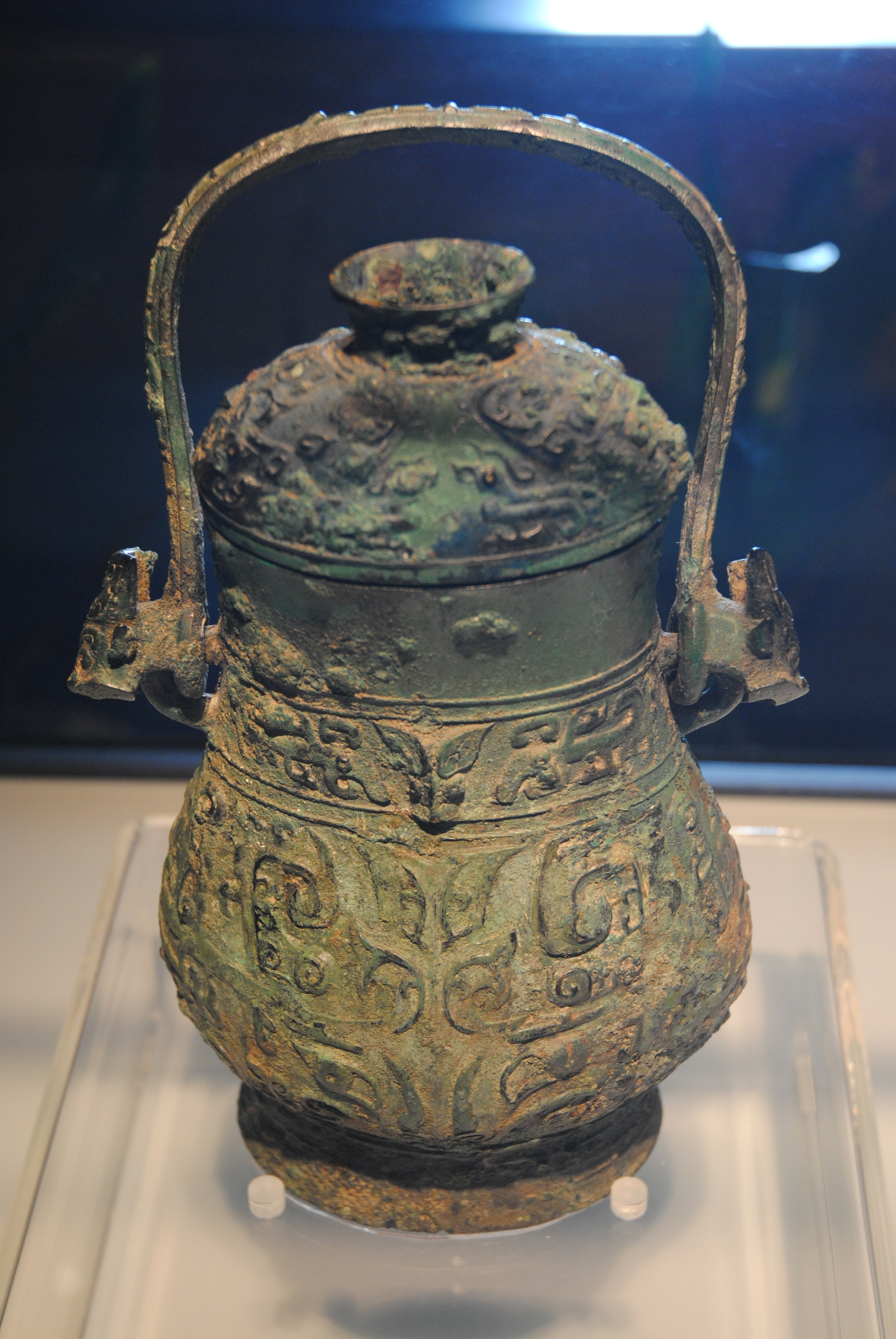
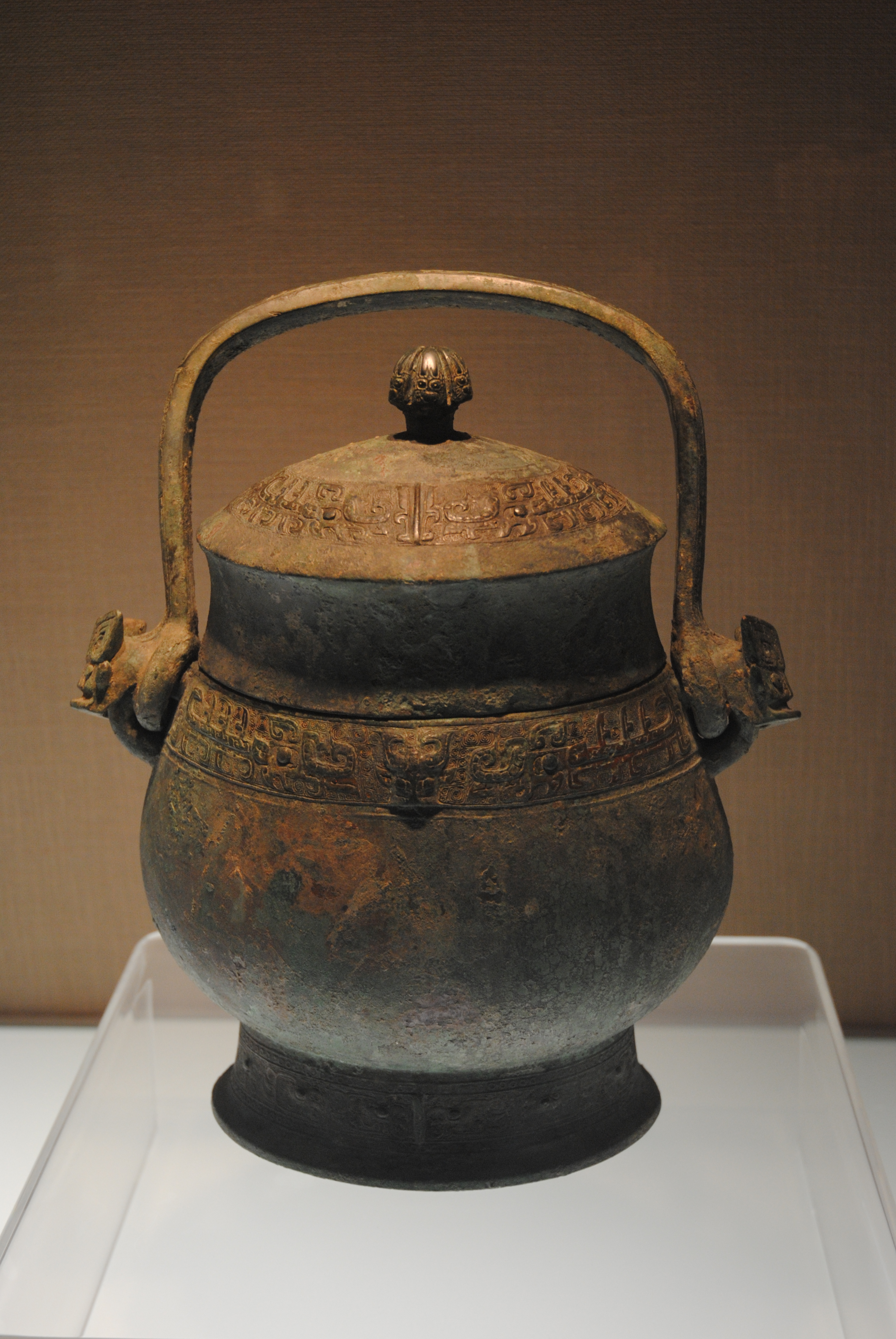
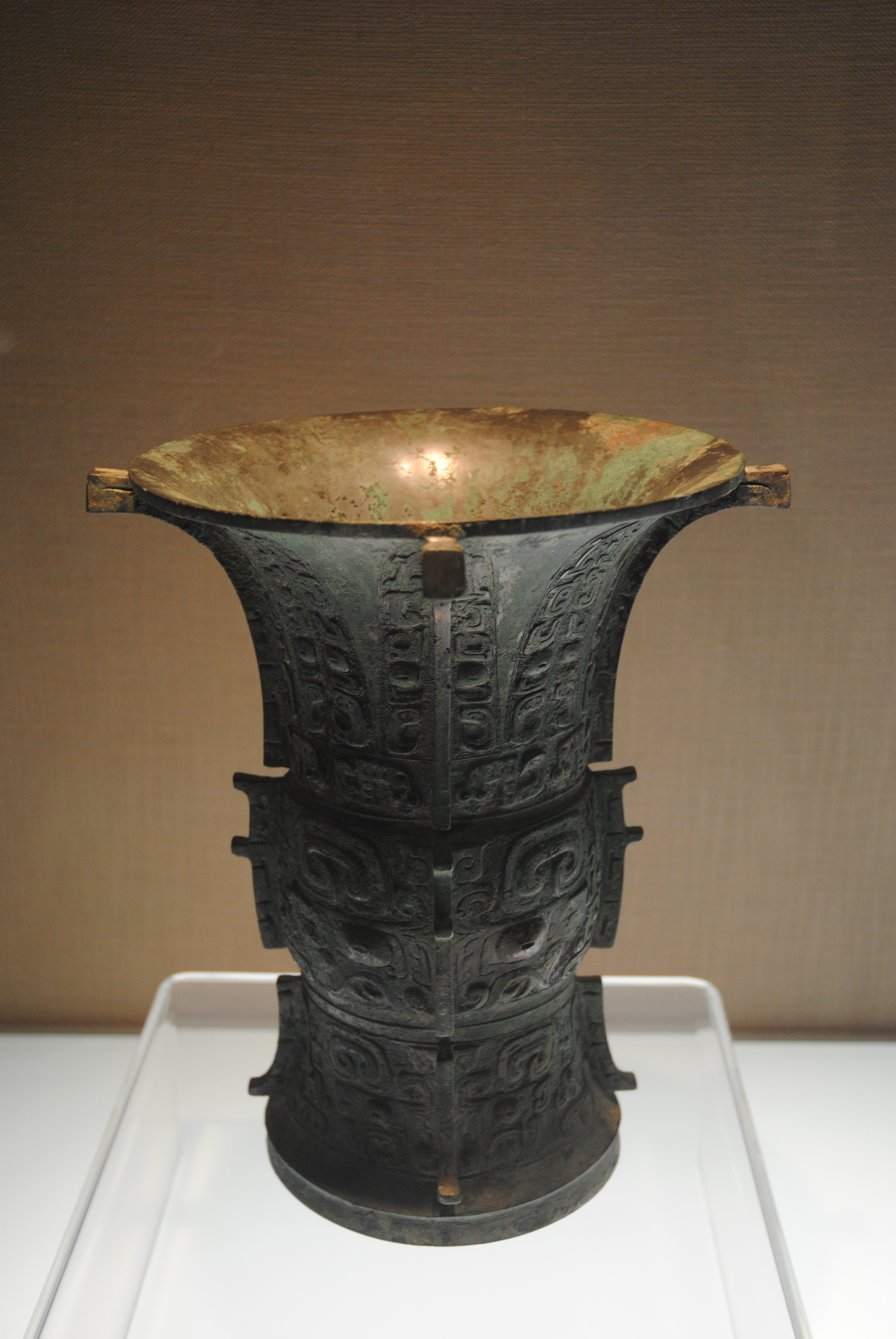

The ancient city at Liulihe measured 3.5 km (2.2 mi) from east to west and 1.5 km (0.93 mi) from north to south, covering an area of 5.25 km^{2} (2.0 sq mi). Some 829 m (2,720 ft) of the north wall and 300 m (980 ft) of the west wall still remain and are visible in the farmland around the museum. A moat 2 m (6.6 ft) deep surrounded the city. A palace was located inside the city just north of city center with sacrificial sites and living quarters nearby. Cemeteries located outside the city to the southeast are divided by the Beijing-Guangzhou Railway into Sectors I and II. Sector I, from the Shang dynasty, is smaller in size and contains remnants of human and dog sacrifice. Sector II, possibly from the Zhou dynasty, contains greater numbers of large- and medium-sized tombs of nobles with chariots and rich set of burial items. In all, 200 tombs have been found, with the largest containing 42 sacrificed horses. Several thousand ceramic, ivory, jade, bone, lacquer and bronze artifacts including bronze ceremonial vessels and weapons have been found at the Liulihe Site.

The most historically significant discovery at Liulihe is M1193, the tomb of the Marquis of Yan, which yielded two inscribed bronzes. These two bronzes memorialize exchanges between Yan, the vassal state, and the kings of the Zhou dynasty. The inscriptions on the bronzes describe investiture ceremony and the enfeoffment of the vassal State of Yan to the Duke of Shao. The inscriptions corroborate the Records of the Grand Historian, which states that when King Wu of Zhou defeated the Shang dynasty and founded the Zhou dynasty in 1045 B.C., he conferred titles of nobility to vassal rulers in his domain. Among those receiving titles were the rulers of the States of Ji and Yan, two states located in modern-day Beijing Municipality. The capital of Yan at Liulihe has been established with considerable certainty through archaeological evidence at Liulihe. The capital of Ji, is believed to be located further north, near modern-day Guang'anmen in Xicheng District.

The artifacts unearthed at Liulihe demonstrate the Yan capital's wealth and political importance during the Western Zhou dynasty dating back to at least the 11th century B.C. During the subsequent Eastern around in the 7th century B.C., the state of Yan conquered the State of Ji to the north and moved its capital from Liulihe to Ji, which became the urban center of Beijing for the next 2,000 years until the 13th century, when the city centre shifted further north during the Yuan dynasty.

The ancient city at Liulihe was discovered in 1962. Four major archaeological excavation were undertaken from 1972 to the early 1990s. The site was named a National Level Cultural Heritage Protection Site in 1988 and planning for a museum began in 1990. The Western Zhou dynasty Yan Capital Site Museum opened on August 21, 1995. In 1996, a tortoise shell was discovered in H108 with the initials of King Cheng of Zhou, the second ruler of the Zhou dynasty who ruled from 1042 to 1020 B.C. This artifact has been used in the Xia–Shang–Zhou Chronology Project.

== Museum ==
The museum complex occupies 18,000 m^{2} (190,000 sq ft) of land at the Liulihe Site. The main exhibition hall with 3,000 m^{2} (32,000 sq ft) display space is divided into seven halls—including the Halls of Bronze Ceremonial Ware, Entombed Chariots, Bronze Libation Vessels and Weapons, and Ceramic and Lacquerware. In all, there are over 300 artifacts and hundreds of other models and replicas on display.

=== Access ===
The museum is located near Dongjialin Village in Liulihe Township in Fangshan District off the G4 Expressway and National Highway 107. Parking is available.

Beijing Bus Route No. 834, 835 and 835快 and Fangshan Bus Route No. 房27 and 房39 stop at the Shang Zhou dynasty Site (商周遗址站).

=== Information ===
Admission is free to the museum, which is closed on Mondays.

== See also ==
- History of Beijing
