= Lilingyan =

Ancient Chinese irrigation system

Lilingyan (Chinese: 戾陵堰; pinyin: lìlíngyàn) was an ancient irrigation system built in 250 AD during the Three Kingdoms period to irrigate the Beijing Plain around Jicheng (modern-day Beijing). The irrigation system consisted of Lilingyan, a dam across the Shishui (Yongding River) at the foot of Liangshan (Shijingshan), and the Chexiangqu, a diversion channel that carried the water west into the Beijing Plain. The diversion channel fed water to the fields north, east and southeast of Jicheng and emptied into the Gaoliang River, which flowed back into the Yongding River. The irrigation system was an important development in Beijing's early history and helped increase food production and population in and around the city. Lilingyan was named after Liling, the tomb of Liu Dan, Prince of Yan, who was buried in Liangshan after his death in 80 BC.

== History ==
Lilingyan was built in 250 AD by Liu Jing, a military commander of Youzhou, a prefecture in north China based in Jicheng. Liu Jing was the son of Liu Fu, who had built irrigation systems along the Huai River. As the commander of the local garrison, Liu Jing had to purchase grain from afar due to limited food production locally. To improve local agricultural output, Liu Jing diverted the waters of the Yongding River, which flowed south of Jicheng to irrigate the plains to the north of the Yongding River. He deployed soldiers to dam the Yongding in the hills west of Ji and channeled the water eastward along the Chexiangqu into the Beijing Plain. The dam was 2.4 meters high and piled from woven baskets of stone. To withstand the flash flood of theYongding as the river flows out of the Western Hills, the dam was 72 meters thick and gently sloped so that flood water can flow over the dam. The Chexiangqu made use of the old river bed of the Yongding, which used to flow north of Jicheng before it changed course and flowed south of the city.

In 262, a sluice gate was added to control the flow of water into the diversion channel. The irrigation system greatly improved agricultural output of the region and helped increase the population of Ji. In 295, Liu Jing's son, Liu Hong, repaired and expanded the irrigation system by extending the aqueduct further east to modern-day Tongzhou.

During the Northern Qi dynasty, the irrigation system was repaired in 519 and further expanded in 565 by connecting channels to the Sha River further north. The system was again repaired in 650-655 during the Tang dynasty, and later became part of subsequent irrigation systems of Beijing. Much of the land irrigated by the Lilingyan is now under urban Beijing, after the city shifted northward from Jicheng to Dadu in the 13th century.

== See also ==
- History of Beijing
- Dujiangyan
- Geography of Beijing
