= Zhuo Commandery =

Ancient Chinese political subdivision

Zhuo Commandery (Chinese: 涿郡) or Fanyang Commandery (Chinese: 范陽郡) was a commandery in imperial China from the Han dynasty to the Tang dynasty, located in modern Hebei and Beijing.

== Han dynasty ==
Zhuo Commandery was established during Emperor Gao of Han's reign from the Qin-era Guangyang, Julu and Hengshan commanderies, with the seat at Zhuo (涿, modern Zhuozhou). In Western Han dynasty, it administered 29 counties: Zhuo, Nai (迺), Guqiu (穀丘), Gu'an (故安), Nan Shenze (南深澤), Fanyang (范陽), Liwu (蠡吾), Rongcheng (容城), Yi (易), Guangwang (廣望), Mao (鄚), Gaoyang (高陽), Zhouxiang (州鄉), Anping (安平), Fanyu (樊輿), Cheng (成), Liangxiang (良鄉), Lixiang (利鄉), Linxiang (臨鄉), Yichang (益昌), Yangxiang (陽鄉), Xixiang (西鄉), Raoyang (饒陽), Zhongshui (中水), Wuyuan (武垣), Aling (阿陵), Awu (阿武), Gaoguo (高郭) and Xinchang (新昌). In 2 AD, the population was 782,764, in 195,670 households. Most of the counties were abolished in Eastern Han, and only 7 counties were listed in the Book of Later Han: Zhuo, Nai, Gu'an, Liangxiang, Bei Xincheng (北新城) and Fangcheng (方城, formerly part of Guangyang). In 140 AD, the population was 633,754, in 102,218 households.

== Cao Wei and Jin dynasty ==
During Emperor Wen of Wei's reign, Zhuo was renamed Fanyang (范陽). After the establishment of Jin dynasty, the territory was reorganized into the Principality of Fanyang (范陽國). Three princes held the title Prince of Fanyang:

- Sima Sui (司馬綏), Prince Kang (康) of Fanyang, 265–279;
- Sima Xiao (司馬虓), 279–306;
- Sima Li (司馬黎), 306, killed during the War of the Eight Princes.

The principality consisted of 8 counties: Zhuo, Liangxiang, Fangcheng, Changxiang (長鄉), Nai, Gu'an, Fanyang and Rongcheng. The population was 11,000 households in 280 AD.

== Sui and Tang dynasties ==
In Sui and Tang dynasties, Zhuo Commandery (before 742) and Fanyang Commandery (after 742) were alternative names of the You Prefecture (幽州). It administered 9 counties, and the population in 742 was 371,312, in 67,243 households. The seat was Ji (present-day Beijing).
