= Guangyang Commandery =

Historic commandery of China

- Traditional Chinese: 廣陽郡
- Simplified Chinese: 广阳郡
- Literal meaning: Commandery of Expansive Yang
Transcriptions
Standard Mandarin
- Hanyu Pinyin: Guǎngyáng Jùn
- Wade–Giles: Kuang-yang Chün

Guangyang Principality
- Traditional Chinese: 廣陽國
- Simplified Chinese: 广阳国
- Literal meaning: State, Kingdom, or Principality of Expansive Yang
Transcriptions
Standard Mandarin
- Hanyu Pinyin: Guǎngyángguó
- Wade–Giles: Kuang-yang-kuo

Guangyou Principality
- Traditional Chinese: 廣有國
- Simplified Chinese: 广有国
Transcriptions
Standard Mandarin
- Hanyu Pinyin: Guǎngyǒuguó
- Wade–Giles: Kuang-yu-kuo

Guangyang Commandery, at times also Guangyang or Guangyou Principality, was a territory of early imperial China located in modern Hebei and Beijing.

== Qin dynasty ==
Guangyang Commandery was first established during Qin Shi Huang's reign as part of the Qin Kingdom and Empire in the territory of the former state of Yan.

== Western Han dynasty ==
In the early Han dynasty, its land became the fief of the Princes of Yan. The commandery was restored in 80 BC, after Prince Dan (劉旦) of Yan's rebellion was suppressed. In 73 BC, Liu Jian, a son of Liu Dan, was granted the title Prince of Guangyang, and the commandery became his fief.

Four princes held the title Prince of Guangyang:

- Liu Jian (劉建), Prince Qing (頃) of Guangyang, 73–45 BC;
- Liu Shun (劉舜), Prince Mu (穆) of Guangyang, 45–23 BC;
- Liu Huang (劉璜), Prince Si (思) of Guangyang, 23–3 BC;
- Liu Jia (劉嘉), 3 BC – 9 AD, deposed after the establishment of Xin dynasty.

The principality had a population of 70,658 in 2 AD, in 20,740 households. It consisted of four counties: Ji (薊), Fangcheng (方城), Guangyang (廣陽) and Yinxiang (陰鄉).

== Xin dynasty ==
During Wang Mang's Xin dynasty, the principality was renamed Guangyou.

== Eastern Han dynasty ==
The commandery was expanded, and administered five counties: Ji, Guangyang, Changping (昌平, formerly part of Shanggu Commandery), Jundu (軍都, formerly part of Shanggu) and Anci (安次, formerly part of Bohai Commandery). The seat, Ji, was also the seat of You Province. In 140 AD, the population was 280,600, in 44,550 households. With the beginning of the Three Kingdoms period, the commandery was abolished and merged into the Principality of Yan (燕國).

== Northern Wei ==
Northern Wei established a commandery of the same name in 441 with three counties, Yanle (燕樂), Guangxing (廣興) and Fangcheng. The seat was Yanle, in present-day Longhua County, Hebei. The population was 8,919, and the households numbered 2,800. The commandery was abolished in Northern Qi.

== See also ==
- History of Beijing
- Jicheng (Beijing)
