= Lu Wan =

Han dynasty vassal king (died 194 BCE)

King of Donghu 東胡王
- Tenure: 195–194 BC
- Successor: Unknown

King of Yan 燕王
- Tenure: 202–195 BC
- Predecessor: Zang Tu
- Successor: Liu Jian
- Born: 256 BC; Feng County, Jiangsu
- Died: 194 BC
- Occupation: Vassal king

Lu Wan (盧綰; died 194 BC) was a Chinese vassal king of the early Han dynasty. A close friend of Liu Bang, the founding emperor of the Han dynasty, he fought on Liu's side as a general during the rebellions against the Qin dynasty, the Chu–Han Contention against Liu's rival Xiang Yu, and against other hostile vassal kings in the early part of Liu's reign as emperor. For his contributions to the establishment of the Han dynasty, Lu Wan was made a vassal king – King of Yan (燕王) – by Liu Bang in 202 BC. In 195 BC, sensing that Liu Bang had doubts about his loyalty, Lu Wan fled and defected to the Xiongnu, who made him King of Donghu (東胡王), and lived among them for about a year until his death.

== Early life ==
Lu Wan was from Feng Town (豐邑), which is in present-day Feng County, Jiangsu. His father and Liu Bang's father were close friends, while Lu Wan and Liu Bang were also close childhood friends. Lu Wan shared the same birthday as Liu Bang and studied in the same school as him.

Around 209 BC, when Liu Bang rebelled against the Qin dynasty, Lu Wan supported him in the rebellion. After the collapse of the Qin dynasty in 206 BC, Xiang Yu, the de facto leader of the rebel forces that overthrew the Qin dynasty, divided the former Qin Empire into the Eighteen Kingdoms, each ruled by a king who nominally paid allegiance to Emperor Yi of Chu, the puppet monarch he controlled.

Liu Bang became the King of Han and was given Hanzhong and the Bashu region (present-day Sichuan and Chongqing) as his domain. He gave Lu Wan two concurrent appointments as General (將軍) and Palace Attendant. Later, when Liu Bang engaged Xiang Yu in a power struggle – historically known as the Chu–Han Contention (206–202 BC) – for supremacy over China, Lu Wan accompanied Liu Bang into battle as the Grand Commandant (太尉) of the Han army. Owing to his close friendship with Liu Bang, he received many gifts from Liu Bang and was allowed to enter Liu's living quarters freely. Even Liu's other close aides, including Xiao He and Cao Shen, did not receive the same level of treatment from their lord as Lu Wan. Liu Bang also awarded Lu Wan the title "Marquis of Chang'an" (長安侯).

== Service under the Han dynasty ==
In the winter of 202 BC, after Liu Bang defeated Xiang Yu at the Battle of Gaixia, he ordered his relative Liu Jia (劉賈) and Lu Wan to lead troops to attack Gong Wei, the King of Linjiang. Lu Wan and Liu Jia defeated Gong Wei, conquered Linjiang, and returned by the seventh lunar month of the following year.

Lu Wan later followed Liu Bang to attack Zang Tu, the King of Yan, whom they defeated. By then, Liu Bang had unified most – if not all – of the former Eighteen Kingdoms under his control and established the Han dynasty as the ruling dynasty in China. Although Liu Bang had already awarded vassal king titles to seven men who were not from his own clan, he wanted to make Lu Wan a vassal king as well, so he sought his subjects' opinions. Liu Bang's subjects were well aware of Lu Wan's close relationship with the emperor, so they nominated Lu Wan on the grounds that he had made great contributions in the battles against the rival kingdoms. In the eighth lunar month of 202, Lu Wan was formally created King of Yan.

=== Secretly contacting Chen Xi and the Xiongnu ===
In the autumn of 197 BC, when Chen Xi started a rebellion and declared himself the King of Dai, Liu Bang personally led his troops to suppress the rebellion, while Lu Wan also led his men to help the emperor by attacking Chen Xi from the northeast. Chen Xi sent Wang Huang (王黃) as a messenger to seek help from the Xiongnu; Lu Wan also sent his subordinate, Zhang Sheng (張勝), to meet the Xiongnu and spread news that Chen Xi was going to be defeated, and urge the Xiongnu to refrain from helping him.

On his way to Xiongnu territory, Zhang Sheng met Zang Yan (臧衍), Zang Tu's son, who was living in exile. Zang Yan told him that the vassal kingdom of Yan was able to remain stable and continue existing because Liu Bang was busy suppressing rebellions. As long as there was war, Yan would continue serving a useful purpose as an ally of Liu Bang by helping him fight opposing forces. Once there was peace, Yan would lose its purpose and might end up like most of the other vassal kingdoms, which had been dissolved and some of their rulers had been executed by Liu Bang on false charges of treason.

Zhang Sheng heeded Zang Yan's advice to secretly arrange with the Xiongnu to help Chen Xi attack Yan. When Lu Wan heard that Zhang Sheng was plotting with the Xiongnu to attack his vassal kingdom, he wrote to Liu Bang to seek permission from the emperor to execute Zhang Sheng's family for treason. However, after Zhang Sheng returned and related to Lu Wan what Zang Yan had told him, Lu Wan changed his mind and spared Zhang Sheng's family. He then ordered Zhang Sheng to continue serving as his messenger to the Xiongnu, while sending Fan Qi (范齊) to secretly contact Chen Xi and arrange to help Chen Xi prolong the survival of his rebellion.

=== Liu Bang's suspicions towards Lu Wan ===
In 195 BC, Liu Bang attacked Ying Bu, another vassal king who had rebelled against him. At the same time, he sent Fan Kuai to attack Chen Xi. One of Chen Xi's lieutenants who had surrendered to Fan Kuai revealed that Fan Qi, Lu Wan's subordinate, had been secretly keeping in contact with Chen Xi. After Fan Kuai relayed the information to Liu Bang, the emperor became suspicious of Lu Wan so he summoned his childhood friend to the capital for questioning.

When Lu Wan refused, claiming that he was ill, Liu Bang sent Shen Fiji (審食其) and Zhao Yao (趙堯) to fetch Lu Wan to the capital and conduct an investigation in Yan. Lu Wan became very fearful when heard about it so he pretended to be ill and confined himself at home and refused to meet Shen Yiji and Zhao Yao. He told his close aides, "Of all the vassal kings not from the imperial clan, only Wu Chen (吳臣) and I are left. Hán Xin and Peng Yue lost their lives because of Empress Lü. His Majesty is ill and has entrusted all state affairs to the Empress. The Empress is finding excuses to eliminate all the non-imperial clan nobles and subjects who have made great contributions." He continued to pretend to be sick.

After Shen Yiji returned to the capital, he reported to Liu Bang what Lu Wan had told his aides, causing the emperor to turn furious. Later, after learning from Xiongnu prisoners-of-war that Lu Wan had sent Zhang Sheng to meet the Xiongnu, the emperor became angrier and more convinced that Lu Wan, his childhood friend, had turned against him.

== Death ==
In the second lunar month of 195 BC, after Liu Bang sent Fan Kuai to attack Lu Wan, Lu Wan gathered all his family members and subordinates, numbering a few thousands people in total, escaped from his vassal kingdom, and settled in a location near the Great Wall. He planned to turn himself in to Liu Bang and plead for forgiveness after the emperor had recovered from his illness. However, the emperor died two months later before Lu Wan could do so. When Lu Wan received news of Liu Bang's death, he gathered his family and subordinates and defected to the Xiongnu, who gave him the title "King of Donghu" (東胡王). While living among the Xiongnu, Lu Wan was often attacked and robbed by barbarians, and he often thought of returning home. He died a year later.

== Family and descendants ==
When Empress Lü ruled the Han Empire as regent after Liu Bang's death, Lu Wan's family members managed to return to Han territory. They wanted to meet her but she died of illness before they could meet. Lu Wan's widow also died of illness not long later.

In 144 BC, Lu Wan's grandson, Lu Tazhi (盧他之), who had inherited the title "King of Donghu" from his grandfather, surrendered to the Han Empire and was enfeoffed as the Marquis of Yagu (亞谷侯).

Chinese royalty
Preceded by Zang Tu	King of Yan; 202 BCE – 195 BCE	Succeeded by Liu Jian
