= Han Guang =

- Traditional Chinese: 韓廣
- Simplified Chinese: 韩广
Transcriptions
Standard Mandarin
- Hanyu Pinyin: Hán Guǎng
- Wade–Giles: Han Kuang

Han Guang (died 206 BC) was the ruler of the Kingdom of Liaodong (遼東國) of the Eighteen Kingdoms during the Chu–Han Contention, an interregnum between the Qin and Han dynasties of China.

== Life ==
Han Guang was initially a minor official serving in the former Zhao state, which was conquered by the Qin state in 228 BC. In 209 BC, when Chen Sheng and Wu Guang started an uprising to overthrow the Qin dynasty, Han Guang participated in the rebellion. Chen Sheng sent Wu Chen to seize control of the former Zhao territories from Qin forces. After conquering the Zhao territories, Wu Chen sent Han Guang to rally support from the people living in the former Yan state. Han Guang received a warm welcome and was nominated by the people of Yan to be their king.

The following year, the Zhao state came under attack by a Qin army led by Zhang Han. Han Guang sent his general Zang Tu to lead an army to help the Zhao state. Zang Tu followed the rebel coalition force led by Xiang Yu into subsequent battles against Qin forces and eventually overthrew the Qin dynasty in 206 BC.

After the fall of the Qin dynasty, Xiang Yu divided the former Qin Empire into the Eighteen Kingdoms. He granted Han Guang the title of King of Liaodong (遼東王) and relocated Han Guang to the Liaodong Peninsula. Han Guang's original territories in the former Yan state were granted to Zang Tu, who was appointed by Xiang Yu as the new King of Yan. When Zang Tu came to take control of the Yan territories from Han Guang, the latter refused to give up so Zang Tu defeated Han Guang in battle and killed him.

Chinese royalty
Preceded by King Xi of Yan	King of Yan; 209 BC – 206 BC	Succeeded by Zang Tu
Preceded by None	King of Liaodong; 206 BC	Succeeded by None
