= Ji (state in modern Beijing) =

Ancient Chinese state (c. 11–7th centuries BC)

Ji 薊
- c. 11th century BC–c. 7th century BC
- Status: Monarchy
- Capital: Jicheng
- History
  - Established: c. 11th century BC
  - Conquered by State of Yan: c. 7th century BC

Ji (simplified Chinese: 蓟; traditional Chinese: 薊; pinyin: Jì) was an ancient state in northern China during the Shang and Western Zhou dynasties from at least the 11th century to the 7th century BC. The state was based in the walled City of Ji, or Jicheng, located in the modern day Guang'anmen neighborhood of southwestern Beijing. Around 7th century BC, Ji was conquered by the larger State of Yan, which took the City of Ji as its capital. The city remained the primary urban center in the area until the 13th century, when Kublai Khan built the larger city of Dadu to the northwest, which eventually absorbed the City of Ji.

== History ==
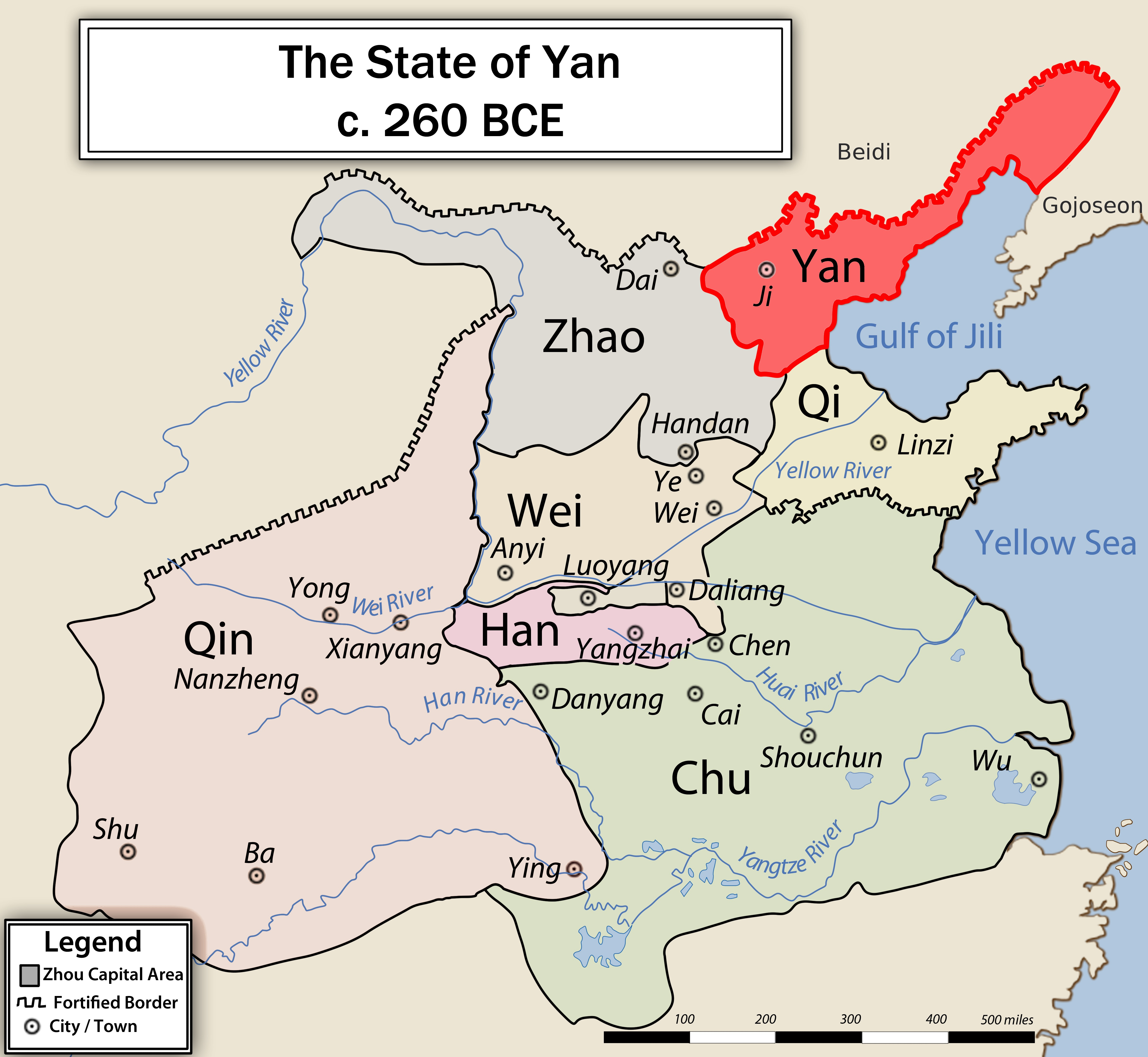
Ji, marked on the map of the Warring States Period, as the capital of the State of Yan.

Ji was a small state during the Shang dynasty that was inhabited by a tribe that was said to have descended from the Yellow Emperor, and became one of the vassal states of the Zhou dynasty. According to Sima Qian's Records of the Grand Historian, King Wu of Zhou, in the 11th year of his reign, deposed Di Xin and conferred titles to nobles within his domain, including the rulers of the city states Ji and Yan. According to the Book of Rites, King Wu of Zhou was so eager to establish his legitimacy after his battle victory over the Shang that before dismounting from his wagon, he named the descendants of the Yellow Emperor to the State of Ji. This was the first mention of Ji in history. The 11th year of the reign of King Wu of Zhou approximates to 1045 BC. The Beijing Municipal Government designates 1045 BC as the first year of the city's history.

The capital of the state was the walled City of Ji or Jicheng (t 薊城, s 蓟城, Jìchéng). The city was located in the southwestern part of present-day Beijing, just south of Guang'anmen in Xicheng and Fengtai Districts. At about the 7th century BC, Ji was absorbed by neighboring Yan, which made the City of Ji, its capital.

== See also ==
- History of Beijing
