= Zang Tu =

Chinese warlord

- Chinese: 臧荼
Transcriptions
Standard Mandarin
- Hanyu Pinyin: Zāng Tú
- Wade–Giles: Tsang T'u

Zang Tu (died c.October 202 BC) was a Chinese military general, monarch, politician, and warlord who lived during the late Qin dynasty and early Han dynasty of China.

== Biography ==
Zang Tu was originally a military general serving under Han Guang, the king of the Yan state. Around 207 BC, when rebellions broke out all over China to overthrow the Qin dynasty, Zang Tu was sent to lead an army to assist rebel forces from the insurgent Zhao state, which were under attack by a Qin army led by Zhang Han. Following the defeat of Qin forces at the Battle of Julu, Zang Tu joined a coalition rebel army under the command of Xiang Yu of the Chu state, and followed Xiang Yu as they fought their way to the Qin capital Xianyang.

In 206 BC, after the fall of the Qin dynasty, Xiang Yu divided the former Qin Empire into the Eighteen Kingdoms and appointed Zang Tu as the King of Yan (燕王). Part of the former Yan kingdom was granted to Han Guang, who was appointed by Xiang Yu as the King of Liaodong. Zang Tu then returned to the Yan kingdom and attempted to force Han Guang to move to his allocated kingdom in the Liaodong Peninsula, but the latter refused to comply. As a result, Zang Tu attacked Han Guang and killed him at Wuzhong, thereby becoming king of a united Yan kingdom.

In 204 BC, after his victory against the Zhao kingdom at the Battle of Jingxing, Han Xin followed Li Zuoche's advice and sent a messenger to Zang Tu, asking him to pledge allegiance to Liu Bang, the King of Han. Zang Tu agreed. In 202 BC, Liu Bang defeated Xiang Yu and unified China under his rule, proclaiming himself Emperor of China and establishing the Han dynasty on 28 February. Zang Tu became a vassal of the Han Empire and retained his kingly title and territories. Later that year in c.August, Zang Tu rebelled against the Han Empire, invading and capturing territory in the Dai kingdom. Liu Bang personally led an army to suppress the rebellion. Zang Tu was defeated in battle and captured in c.October. He refused to surrender and was executed by Liu Bang.

== Descendants ==
Zang Tu had a son called Zang Yan (臧衍), who escaped to join the Xiongnu after his father died.

Zang Tu's granddaughter, Zang Er (臧兒), married Wang Zhong, and had a daughter called Wang Zhi. Wang Zhi became the second wife of Emperor Jing, the fourth emperor of the Han dynasty, and the mother of the future Emperor Wu.

Chinese royalty
Preceded by Han Guang	King of Yan; 206 BC – 202 BC	Succeeded by Lu Wan
