= 205 BC =

205 BC in various calendars
- Gregorian calendar: 205 BC; CCV BC
- Ab urbe condita: 549
- Ancient Egypt era: XXXIII dynasty, 119
- Pharaoh: Ptolemy IV Philopator, 17
- Ancient Greek Olympiad (summer): 143rd Olympiad, year 4
- Assyrian calendar: 4546
- Balinese saka calendar: N/A
- Bengali calendar: −798 – −797
- Berber calendar: 746
- Buddhist calendar: 340
- Burmese calendar: −842
- Byzantine calendar: 5304–5305
- Chinese calendar: 乙未年 (Wood Goat); 2493 or 2286 — to — 丙申年 (Fire Monkey); 2494 or 2287
- Coptic calendar: −488 – −487
- Discordian calendar: 962
- Ethiopian calendar: −212 – −211
- Hebrew calendar: 3556–3557
- Hindu calendars
- Vikram Samvat: −148 – −147
- Shaka Samvat: N/A
- Kali Yuga: 2896–2897
- Holocene calendar: 9796
- Iranian calendar: 826 BP – 825 BP
- Islamic calendar: 851 BH – 850 BH
- Javanese calendar: N/A
- Julian calendar: N/A
- Korean calendar: 2129
- Minguo calendar: 2116 before ROC 民前2116年
- Nanakshahi calendar: −1672
- Seleucid era: 107/108 AG
- Thai solar calendar: 338–339
- Tibetan calendar: ཤིང་མོ་ལུག་ལོ་ (female Wood-Sheep) −78 or −459 or −1231 — to — མེ་ཕོ་སྤྲེ་ལོ་ (male Fire-Monkey) −77 or −458 or −1230

Year 205 BC was a year of the pre-Julian Roman calendar. At the time it was known as the Year of the Consulship of Scipio and Dives (or, less frequently, year 549 Ab urbe condita). The denomination 205 BC for this year has been used since the early medieval period, when the Anno Domini calendar era became the prevalent method in Europe for naming years.

== Events ==
=== By place ===
==== Seleucid Empire ====
- Returning via the Persian provinces of Arachosia, Drangiana, and Carmania, Antiochus III arrives in Persis. He then leads a short expedition down the Persian Gulf and receives tribute of 500 talents of silver from the citizens of Gerrha, a mercantile state on the west coast of the Persian Gulf.
- Antiochus III returns from his eastern campaigns, after having defeated the Bactrians and subjugated the Parthians and thus being able to partly restore Seleucid power in these provinces by crushing the revolting governors of Media, Persia and Anatolia. Having established a system of vassal states in the East, Antiochus now adopts the ancient Achaemenid title of "great king", and the Greeks, comparing him to Alexander the Great, surname him "the Great", that is to say Antiochus III Megas.

==== Greece ====
- Philip V of Macedon makes a temporary peace (the Peace of Phoenice) with Rome on favourable terms for Macedonia ending the First Macedonian War. The treaty formally acknowledges the favourable position of Macedonia, including their capture of Illyria, but in return Philip effectively repudiates his alliance with Hannibal.
- After the peace, the Spartan king, Nabis, goes to war with the Achaean League. The Achaean general Philopoemen expels Nabis of Sparta from Messene.
- The Peace of Phoenice prohibits Philip from expanding westward into Illyria or the Adriatic Sea, so the king turns his attentions eastwards to the Aegean Sea, where he starts to build a large fleet. After concluding the First Macedonian War, Philip of Macedon, seeing his chance to defeat Rhodes, forms an alliance with Aetolian and Spartan pirates who begin raiding Rhodian ships. The Cretan War begins between Philips' Macedonians, the Aetolian League, several Cretan cities (of which Olous and Hierapytna are the most important) and Spartan pirates against the forces of Rhodes and later Attalus I of Pergamum, Byzantium, Cyzicus, Athens and Knossos.
- With the Rhodian fleet and economy suffering from the depredations of the pirates, Philip begins attacking the lands of Rhodes' allies in Thrace and around the Sea of Marmara.

==== Roman Republic ====
- Publius Cornelius Scipio boldly determines to disregard Hannibal in Italy and political opposition in the Roman Senate and rather decides to strike at the Carthaginian holdings in North Africa. Scipio crosses to Sicily with an army consisting partly of volunteers as the Roman Senate would not provide him with an army.
- The Roman propraetor Quintus Pleminius captures the town of Epizephyrian Locris from the Carthaginians. Hannibal's attempt to recapture the town is foiled by the appearance of Scipio's army.
- Scipio sends the Roman general Gaius Laelius to North Africa to prepare the way for his later invasion.
- A Carthaginian army under Mago Barca lands in Liguria, capturing Genoa and Savona.
- Hannibal erects a bilingual Punic/Greek inscription describing his accomplishments in the temple of Juno Lacinia near Crotone.

==== Egypt ====
- The native Egyptian population rises in rebellion against their Greek rulers. The revolt spreads to Upper Egypt.
- Ptolemy IV dies and is succeeded by his five-year-old son Ptolemy V. However, no public announcement is made about the king's death.

==== China ====
- Xiang Yu defeats Liu Bang in the Battle of Pengcheng.
- Han Xin captures Feiqiu, the last holdout of Zhang Han, thus completing the Han conquest of the Three Qins. Zhang Han commits suicide.
- Han Xin defeats Wei Bao and conquers the kingdom of Wei.
- Xiang Yu besieges Liu Bang's forces in Xingyang and Chenggao.
- Han Xin begins the conquest of Dai and Zhao, and he defeats Chen Yu in the Battle of Jingxing.
- Ying Bu, the king of Jiujiang, allies with Liu Bang.

==== Northern Asia ====
- The Xiongnu leader, Modu Chanyu, conquers the neighbouring nomadic Yuezhi and Donghu peoples, thereby establishing the Xiongnu Empire. He appoints a Tuqi King of the left (east) and a Tuqi King of the right (west) to prevent rebellions.

== Deaths ==
- Ptolemy IV Philopator, Greek king of Egypt who has reigned from 221 BC (b. c. 238 BC)
- Sima Ang, Chinese ruler of the Eighteen Kingdoms
- Zhang Han, Chinese general of the Qin dynasty
