= Yuan An =

First century Han dynasty scholar, administrator and statesman

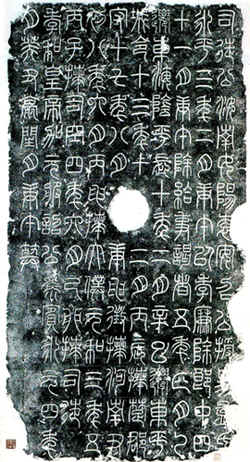
A stele erected in 117, with key dates in Yuan An's public life

Yuan An (袁安) (died 9 April 92), courtesy name Shaogong (邵公), was a Chinese politician. At the Han dynasty courts of Emperor Zhang and Emperor He, Yuan was regarded as the founder of the powerful Yuan clan of Runan, one of the leading aristocratic families of the Eastern Han.

== Early life and career ==
Born in Ruyang (汝陽), Runan Commandery (near modern Shangshui, Henan province) to a gentry family, Yuan An inherited knowledge in the Book of Changes from his grandfather Yuan Liang (袁良), who had reached the position of magistrate around 25. With this learning, Yuan An established a reputation for himself in his native commandery. After some minor clerical experience, he was recommended as "Filially Pious and Incorrupt" by the Magistrate of Ruyang in 60 and travelled to Luoyang to serve at the imperial court. In 62, he left the capital and for the next eight years, he held the relatively insignificant positions of Chief and then Magistrate in the eastern provinces.

On 2 February 71, Yuan An received his first major assignment as Grand Administrator of Chu Commandery, to investigate Liu Ying, the King of Chu, who was accused of heresy and treason, and thousands of locals were accused of being involved in the plot. In Chu, Yuan An saved four hundred innocent households, despite warnings that this act may label him as a "sympathizer of the rebels". The subsequent administrative and judicial proceedings were regarded with satisfaction by Emperor Ming. On 18 September 74, Yuan was recalled to the capital to serve as Intendant of Henan, with executive responsibilities in the territory surrounding Luoyang. In this role, the Hou Han Shu states that "the masters of the capital respected him and his name weighed heavily at the imperial court."

== Politics at the capital and the northern frontier ==
On 9 July 83, Yuan An was promoted to become Grand Coachman, with the rank of one of the Nine Ministers. In the succeeding years, Yuan played an active role in discussions at court regarding the stance of the Han Empire toward the Xiongnu peoples of the northern frontier. In a conference in 85, Yuan argued in favour of a more diplomatic policy toward the Xiongnu opposed by Grand Commandant Zheng Hong (鄭弘) and Minister of Works Diwu Lun (第五倫). In particular, Yuan An spoke encouragingly about the practice of marriage alliances and the keeping of hostages. The next year, he replaced Diwu Lun as Minister of Works on 3 June and on 31 July 87 was promoted again to become Minister over the Masses.

The death of Emperor Zhang in 88 and the succession of his ten-year-old son Emperor He brought significant changes to the political landscape. The regents of the young emperor, Empress Dowager Dou and her brother Dou Xian, favoured a more militaristic policy to the Northern Xiongnu problem. Both their regional background and position at court encouraged them to seek the expansion of central authority through war. With the Grand Commandant Su You, Minister of Works Ren Wei (任隗) and the Nine Ministers, Yuan An marched on the court hall and submitted memorials condemning a campaign in the north. He argued that since the Northern Xiongnu had not invaded the frontier, there was no reason to waste resources on a distant expedition. Despite his strong opposition and that of other conservative advisors, Lady Dou ordered the dispatch of an expeditionary force. In the summer of 89, a Chinese-led force advanced in three columns with minimal opposition and defeated the Northern Shanyu at Jiluo Mountain and pursued him westwards into the Altai ranges. A final offensive in 91 destroyed the Northern Xiongnu, creating a political vacuum in its former territories which the Han empire would struggle to contain in the next two centuries.

Yuan An died on 9 April 92, and was buried on 26 April. A few months later, the Dou clan fell in coup d'état staged by Emperor He. Yuan was posthumously honoured by the Emperor and his eldest son Yuan Shang (袁賞) was given a post at the capital. Yuan An's two younger sons, Yuan Jing (袁京) and Yuan Chang (袁敞), reached the positions of Grand Administrator and Minister of Works respectively. For three generations after this, Yuan An's descendants became the leaders of the powerful Yuan clan of Ru'nan, holding the highest positions in the Han bureaucracy and holding enormous influence among the gentry. During the collapse of the Han empire after 189, his great-great-grandsons Yuan Shao and Yuan Shu formed their own warlord fiefdoms in north China.

== Yuan An stele ==
In 1929, a commemorative stele recording landmarks in Yuan An's life was uncovered at Yanshi County, Henan province. It had been erected around 117, about two decades after his death. The stele, 137.5 cm tall and 71.5 cm wide, is now held at Henan Provincial Museum. It provides dates of his appointments and death not found in his official biography in Hou Han Shu. It matches a similar stele found in 1923, that of his son Yuan Chang. The two may have originally been erected at the same location.
