= Prince of Chu =

Prince of Chu (Chinese: 楚王) may refer to:

== Han dynasty ==
- Han Xin, (202 BC–201 BC) a military commander served under Liu Bang.
- Kings of the Chu Kingdom

== Jin dynasty ==
- Sima Wei, (271–291), one of the prince in War of the Eight Princes.
- Huan Xuan, (369–404) a former Jin general who briefly took over the imperial throne.

== Tang dynasty ==
- Li You (Chinese: 李祐), fifth son of Emperor Taizong of Tang
- Emperor Xuanzong of Tang
- Emperor Daizong of Tang

== Yuan dynasty ==
- Yahudu (Chinese: 牙忽都), grandson of Batu Khan.
- Duoletiemur (Chinese: 朵列帖木兒), son of Yahudu.

== Ming dynasty ==
- Zhu Zhen (Chinese: 朱楨), sixth son of Hongwu Emperor.

== See also ==
- Chu (state)
