= Liu Wu =

Liu Wu may refer to:

- Liu Wu, Prince of Chu, who joined the Rebellion of the Seven States during the early Han dynasty
- Liu Wu, Prince of Liang, second cousin of the Prince of Chu, who opposed the Seven States
- Liu Wu (general), Tang dynasty general served during Emperor Xianzong's reign

== See also ==
- Liu (surname)
