= Yi of Chu =

Yi of Chu may refer to:

- Xiong Yi of Chu, three Chu rulers with the personal name Yi
  - Xiong Yi (11th century BC)
  - Ruo'ao (died 764 BC)
  - King Dao of Chu (died 381 BC)
- Emperor Yi of Chu (died 206 BC), ruler of the revived Chu state in the late Qin dynasty
- Liu Yingke (died 174 BC), Prince Yi of Chu during the Western Han dynasty
