= Sima Ang =

Chinese king of Yin (died 205 BC)

King of Yin
- Reign: 206–205 BC
- Born: Unknown
- Died: 205 BC; Pengcheng (present-day Xuzhou, Jiangsu)

Sima Ang
- Traditional Chinese: 司馬昂 / 司馬卬
- Simplified Chinese: 司马昂 / 司马卬
Transcriptions
Standard Mandarin
- Hanyu Pinyin: Sīmǎ Áng
- Wade–Giles: Szu-ma Ang

Sima Ang (died 205 BC) was the ruler of the Kingdom of Yin (殷國) of the Eighteen Kingdoms during the Chu–Han Contention, an interregnum between the Qin and Han dynasties of China.

Sima Ang originally served under the insurgent Zhao kingdom which emerged during the rebellions to overthrow the Qin dynasty in its final years. After the fall of the Qin dynasty in 206 BC, the former Qin Empire was divided into the Eighteen Kingdoms and Sima Ang was made the King of Yin, which covered parts of present-day northern Henan and southern Hebei provinces and capital at Zhaoge (present-day Qi County, Henan)

In 205 BC, Han Xin conquered the Kingdom of Yin for the Han dynasty and captured Sima Ang, who surrendered to Liu Bang, the founding emperor of the Han dynasty. The former Kingdom of Yin became the Henei Commandery of the Han Empire. Sima Ang died a month later at the Battle of Pengcheng between Liu Bang and his rival Xiang Yu.

== Family ==
Sima Ang was a descendant of the mythological figures Gaoyang and Chongli (Gaoyang's son). Their family held served as xiaguan (夏官; "officers of summer") for generations in the reigns of the mythical emperors Yao and Shun and through the Xia and Shang dynasties. During the Zhou dynasty, officials holding the appointment of xiaguan oversaw military affairs and were collectively known as "sima". Cheng-bo Xiufu (程伯休甫), a descendant of Chongli (Zhurong), helped King Xuan of the Zhou dynasty consolidate his rule over his kingdom. In return, the king rewarded Cheng-bo Xiufu to uesd "Sima"(the official position name that Cheng-bo Xiufu was currently holding) as his family name. So Chengbo Xiufu and his descendants adopted Sima as their family name. The descendants of Cheng-bo Xiufu went some to Zhao, some to Qin. Sima Ang was a descendant of the branch that went to Zhao; Sima Qian was a descendant of the branch that went to Qin.

Sima Fang was a descendant of Sima Ang and Fang's descendants founded the Jin dynasty (266–420).

Chinese royalty
Preceded by None	King of Yin; 206 BC – 205 BC	Unknown
