= Battle of Pengcheng =

Battle of the Chu–Han Contention, BCE 205

Coordinates: 34°16′N 117°10′E

- Part of the Chu-Han contention
Date	April 205 BC
Location	Xuzhou, Jiangsu, China
Result	Chu victory

Belligerents
Kingdom of Western Chu	Kingdom of Han

Commanders and leaders
Xiang Yu	Liu Bang

Strength
30,000	560,000

Casualties and losses
Unknown	200,000+

Battle of Pengcheng
- Traditional Chinese: 彭城之戰
- Simplified Chinese: 彭城之战
Transcriptions
Standard Mandarin
- Hanyu Pinyin: Péngchéng Zhī Zhàn

The Battle of Pengcheng was fought in Pengcheng (present-day Xuzhou, Jiangsu, China) in April 205 BC between the kingdoms of Western Chu and Han, led by Xiang Yu and Liu Bang respectively. The Han forces were unprepared and suffered heavy losses. Several of Liu Bang's family members were captured and some of his allies defected to Chu as a result of his defeat.

== Background ==
In the spring of 205 BC, Xiang Yu was at war with the State of Qi. In 206 the Qi general Tian Rong had forcibly reunited Qi under his rule against the wishes of Xiang Yu. As a result, in December 206 Xiang Yu invaded Qi, and in January 205 he defeated Tian Rong near the city of Chengyang. Tian Rong fled to Pingyuan where he was killed by the locals, and Xiang Yu installed another member of the royal Tian clan, Tian Jia, as the new king. However, resistance remained, and Tian Rong's younger brother Tian Heng gathered tens of thousands of scattered Qi soldiers. Xiang Yu responded by marching all the way to the northern coast of the Shandong peninsula, conducting a campaign of terror as he went, burning homes, burying alive prisoners-of-war, and capturing women, the weak, and the elderly. However, Xiang Yu's brutality prompted rebellions, and Tian Heng defeated and killed Tian Jia in Chengyang. In March Tian Heng then put Tian Rong's son, Tian Guang, on the throne.

Xiang Yu made several attacks on Chengyang but could not retake the city. He was thus distracted when Liu Bang launched an invasion of Western Chu. After invading Guanzhong in August 206 and securing the region as his administrative centre by September (see the Three Qins), Liu Bang had begun to expand his power into the Central Plain. In October he annexed the State of Henan, in November the State of Haan, and in March 205 the States of Western Wei and Yin. In April he used Xiang Yu's assassination of King Huai II of Chu to launch a full-scale war against Xiang Yu for control over China (see the Chu-Han Contention). In January 206, when Xiang Yu made himself Hegemon-King of Western Chu, he had awarded King Huai with the title of Emperor Yi (Acting Emperor). However, it was a ceremonial title, and Xiang Yu employed it as part of his effort to side-line the king. In April 206 he forcibly moved the emperor from the capital Pengcheng to the remote county of Chen south of the Yangtze River, and most of the emperor's ministers refused to follow him into effective exile. In October, recognizing that the emperor could still be used against him, Xiang Yu then had the vassal kings of the formerly Chu southern kingdoms, Ying Bu of Jiujiang, Wu Rui of Hengshan and Gong Ao of Lingjiang, assassinate the figurehead.

In April 205 Liu Bang used this action to declare a war of vengeance against Xiang Yu, dressing in white robes and holding a mourning ceremony for three days. He then sent envoys with the following message to the other kings in China: "The Acting Emperor is the emperor over all the people. We are all his subjects and should place ourselves in his service. Now Xiang Yu has removed the Acting Emperor to the south of the Yangtze River and had him killed in the river. He has committed a serious crime. I have sent all the troops in the area of Guanzhong and the armies of Henei, Henan, and Hedong areas to embark on an expedition together with the forces of the kings of all the states against the one who has ordered the assassination of the Acting Emperor." The Zhao general Chen Yu also sent troops to assist Liu Bang after the latter pretended to have executed the Zhao political exile Zhang Er. The Han General-in-Chief Han Xin remained in Guanzhong to continue the siege of Zhang Han, the former Qin general and current king of Yong, in Feiqiu.

== Han Invasion ==
A massive coalition led by Liu Bang, supposedly consisting of 560,000 troops, converged on the Chu capital of Pengcheng from three directions. A northern army under Cao Shen, Fan Kuai, Zhou Bo and Guan Ying started from Henei, marched to Xiuwu, crossed the Yellow River at the port of Baima, and marched south-east to Dingtao, where they defeated a Chu army under the generals Long Ju and Xiang Tuo before marching to Dang and Xiao. The southern army under Wang Ling, Xue Ou and Wang Xi had already marched to the garrisoned city of Yangxia, which they attacked and captured. The middle army was led by Liu Bang himself, who was accompanied by his advisors Zhang Liang and Chen Ping, the Minister Coachman Xiahou Ying, the generals Jin Xi and Lu Wan, the vassal kings Haan Xin (King of Haan) and Wei Bao (King of Western Wei), the Zhao political exile Zhang Er (originally the King of Changshan), and former kings who had surrendered to Liu Bang, namely Sima Xin of Sai, Dong Yi of Zhai, Shen Yang of Henan, and Sima Ang of Yin. They captured Quyu and marched on Pengcheng via Waihuang. En route, Liu Bang was joined by the warlord Peng Yue, formerly an ally of Tian Rong, whom he made the Prime Minister of Wei and sent north to recapture towns and cities in the former Wei region of Liang. The three armies reached Pengcheng and captured the city.

== Battle ==
Liu Bang confiscated the treasures and concubines in Xiang Yu's palaces and held banquets to celebrate his victory. However, after hearing of the fall of Pengcheng, Xiang Yu ordered the bulk of his forces to continue campaigning in Qi while he personally led 30,000 crack troops to retake the capital. Quickly and secretly, they marched south via the towns of Lu and Huling and reached Pengcheng from the west, encamping about ten miles from the city in present-day Xiao County, Anhui. In doing this, Xiang Yu cut off the coalition army's route of retreat to their bases in the west. The celebrating coalition army was unaware of Xiang Yu's movements.

At dawn Xiang Yu's army attacked the coalition camps, whose soldiers, in their surprise and confusion, began to rout. In the course of the day, Xiang Yu's men fought all the way to Pengcheng, which they recaptured. The coalition troops lacked a clear line of retreat to the west, and the Chu army pursued them further east into the Sishui (泗) and Gu (穀) Rivers, where supposedly more than 100,000 coalition troops were slaughtered. Many of the survivors fled southward towards the hills, but the Chu army pursued them closely and attacked them on the Suishui River, driving them into the waters. Sima Qian claimed that around 100,000 more coalition troops were massacred here, with the corpses blocking the river's flow.

Sima Qian claimed that Xiang Yu's men surrounded Liu Bang, but that he escaped because a great wind confused the Chu formation. In any case, as the coalition army fragmented, Liu Bang escaped with a handful of mounted bodyguards, and he encountered on the road his eldest daughter and second eldest son Liu Ying. The Chu army coerced a local into leading them to two of Liu Bang's family members: his father Liu Taigong and wife Lü Zhi. These two Xiang Yu captured and retained as hostages.

A famous and possibly fictional account of Liu Bang's flight portrays him as so fearful that he thrice dumps his children out of his chariot in order to move faster, and it is only the repeated intervention of Xiahou Ying that secures the children's escape.

== Aftermath ==
Liu Bang had suffered serious losses. His father and wife had been taken as hostages, and the states of Wei, Dai and Zhao soon defected to Xiang Yu, as did the former kings of Sai and Zhai, Sima Xin and Dong Yi. Sima Ang, the former king of Yin, went missing in action.

However, although Xiang Yu had won a stunning reversal, he personally returned to Pengcheng to attend to the needs of his capital, which had been plundered by the occupying Han armies. In doing so, he perhaps compromised his best chance to win the war. He sent a Chu army to build on the momentum of the victory and pursue the Han forces west. However, the Han General-in-Chief Han Xin led reinforcements from Guanzhong into the Central Plain and attacked and defeated this army between Jing County and Suo Village, both in present-day Henan.

Meanwhile, Liu Bang found his way to safety. Arriving first in Xiayi and then Yu, on Zhang Liang's advice he sent the envoy Sui He to Ying Bu, king of Jiujiang, in the hope that Ying would switch sides, although Sui would not succeed in securing Ying's defection until November, following Han Xin's victory at Jingxing. In May Liu Bang arrived in the strong city of Xingyang in the Central Plain, and he and Han Xin reorganized the Han army, establishing strong Han garrisons in Xingyang and nearby Chenggao. Near to Chenggao was Ao Granary, and the Han constructed a walled supply road along the banks of the Yellow River connecting the granary to Xingyang. Liu Bang and Han Xin also put down a rebellion by Wang Wu and Cheng Chu - former Qin commanders - and Shen Tu, the magistrate of Wei, capturing their base, the city of Waihuang.

As Xiang Yu's main army approached Xingyang, Liu Bang made Guan Ying commander of the Gentlemen of the Palace's Cavalry in order to contend with Xiang Yu's numerous cavalrymen. Assisted by the former Qin cavalry commanders Li Bi and Luo Jia, Guan Ying defeated a Chu cavalry force to the east of Xingyang, and was then ordered to attack Chu supply lines. Liu Bang ordered the warlord Peng Yue to also attack Xiang Yu's supply lines, and Peng would conduct these operations up until 203.

In June Han Xin completed the siege of Feiqiu, with Zhang Han committing suicide, and he also developed his plan to conquer northern China, with the aim that Xiang Yu would be too distracted by Liu Bang and his bases of Xingyang and Chenggao to properly counter Han Xin in the north. Moreover, Xiang Yu could not endanger his line of retreat by marching further west past Xingyang and Chenggao into Guanzhong, and so later in the year Xiang began a series of operations designed to capture both cities. These operations saw the cities change hands multiple times and devolved into a war of attrition that would not end until 203 (see the Battle of Gaixia). Thus, the next decisive engagement would not occur around these cities but to the north, in August 205, with Han Xin's conquest of the State of Wei.

== See also ==
- Timeline of the Chu–Han Contention
