= Pengcheng Commandery =

Historic commandery of China

Pengcheng Commandery was a historical commandery of China from Han dynasty to Tang dynasty, centered in Pengcheng (present-day Xuzhou).

== Han dynasty ==
In the early Han dynasty, Pengcheng was a commandery in the Chu Kingdom, a semi-independent kingdom ruled by Liu Jiao, brother of the Emperor Gaozu, and his descendants. After Chu rebelled and was defeated during the Rebellion of the Seven States, a part of Pengcheng was granted to Liu Li (劉禮), a son of Liu Jiao, and retained the name "Chu Kingdom". Pengcheng became a centrally administered commandery in 69 BC, when the Chu king Liu Yanshou (劉延壽) committed suicide for participating in a conspiracy against the Han court. In 51 BC, Chu Kingdom was again created and awarded to Liu Xiao (劉囂), a son of the reigning Emperor Xuan. Xiao's lineage held Chu until Wang Mang's usurpation.

Pengcheng was granted to Liu Ying (劉英), a son of the Emperor Guangwu, as Chu in 37 AD, but was revoked in 70 because Ying was accused of plotting rebellion. In 88, the region was gifted to Liu Gong (劉恭), a son of the Emperor Ming, as the Pengcheng Kingdom. It survived until the end of Han dynasty. In 140 AD, Pengcheng administered 8 counties: Pengcheng (彭城), Wuyuan (武原), Fuyang (傅陽), Lü (呂), Liu (留), Wu (梧), Ziqiu (甾丘), and Guangqi (廣戚). The population was 493,027 individuals, or 86,170 households.

== Jin dynasty ==
Pengcheng continued to serve as the fief of various imperial princes during Cao Wei and the Jin dynasty. In the Jin dynasty, the title Prince of Pengcheng was held by Sima Quan (司馬權), a nephew of Sima Yi, and his descendants. In 280, the population was 4,121 households.

== Yongjia period ==
The region became part of the Sixteen Kingdoms during the Yongjia period. Liu Song conquered it in early 5th century, but later lost the commandery to Northern Wei during Emperor Ming of Song's reign. In 464, Pengcheng administered 5 counties: Pengcheng, Lü, Fan (蕃), Xue (薛) and Liu, with a population of 41,231 (8,627 households). The commandery was abolished in early Sui dynasty.

== Sui and Tang dynasties ==
In Sui and Tang dynasties, Pengcheng became an alternative name of Xu Prefecture. In 741, it covered 7 counties, namely Pengcheng, Xiao, Feng, Pei, Teng, Suqian and Xiapi.
