= Battle of Anyi =

Battle fought between the Kingdom of Han and the Kingdom of Wei

Coordinates: 28°50′42″N 115°32′56″E

- Part of Chu–Han Contention
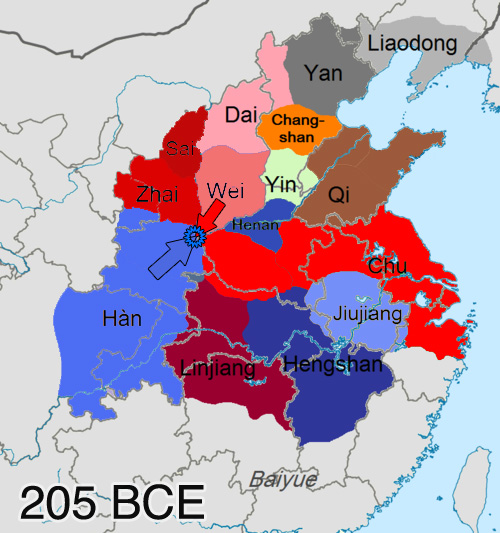
- Location of the battle and state of the Chu-Han contention at the time
Date	August 205 BC
Location	Anyi (modern day Xia County, Shanxi)
Result	Decisive Han Victory

Belligerents
Kingdom of Han	Kingdom of Wei

Commanders and leaders
Han Xin	Wei Bao (POW)

The Battle of Anyi (安邑之戰) was fought between the Kingdom of Han and the Kingdom of Wei fought in August 205 BC during the Chu-Han Contention. It suppressed Wei Bao's rebellion and paved the way for the invasion of the Kingdom of Dai, and ultimately, the Battle of Jingxing.

== Background ==
After the King of Han Liu Bang's disastrous defeat in the Battle of Pengcheng in April 205 BC, many vassal Kings lost confidence in the Han and either sued for peace or defected to Chu. One of these disloyal Kings was Wei Bao, the King of Wei. On the pretext of visiting an ill relative, Wei left Liu Bang and returned to his own lands, where he defected to Chu. Wei Bao had supposedly received a prediction that his consort, Consort Bo (the future Empress Dowager Bo), would give birth to the future Emperor of China and believed that he would be the father (in reality the father would be Liu Bang). Liu Bang first sent his advisor Li Yiji to persuade Wei to surrender, but Li Yiji was unsuccessful. Seeing no other option, Liu sent General-in-Chief Han Xin to suppress Wei Bao's rebellion.

== Campaign ==
The campaign began in the summer of 205 after Han Xin was promoted to Deputy Prime Minister. In a maneuver reminiscent of Alexander the Great at the Hydaspes, Han Xin left a force under Guan Ying on the western bank of the Yellow River opposite the Wei army at Puban, while he secretly advanced upstream and began building rafts. Wei Bao reinforced the forces at Puban, but Han Xin crossed at Xiayang and marched straight for the centrally located city of Anyi.

After defeating a Wei force at Dongzhangcheng, Han Xin defeated the Wei army of general Wang Shang outside Anyi. Capturing Wang Shang and seizing the city, he then marched towards the Wei capital of Pingyang, while the Wei forces at Puban and the Han force of Guan Ying both rushed to link up with their superiors. At Quyang, Han Xin encountered the royal army of Wei Bao and forced Wei Bao to flee to Wuyuan, where he was then captured. Pingyang surrendered upon seeing their king as a captive.

== Aftermath ==
Han Xin proceeded immediately against the kingdoms of Dai and Zhao. Liu Bang spared Wei Bao's life but did not reinstate him as King of Wei, instead making him a general and keeping him under close supervision in Xingyang. He was eventually executed in 204 during the Chu siege of Xingyang, since the Han generals Zhou Ke and Zong Gong, maintaining the Han defense in the absence of Liu Bang, suspected Wei Bao of planning to betray the city to Xiang Yu.
