= Liu Ying (prince) =

Han dynasty prince (died 71)

Liu Ying (simplified Chinese: 刘英; traditional Chinese: 劉英; pinyin: Liú Yīng) (died 3 June 71) was a Chinese prince. He was a son of Emperor Guangwu of Han, and half-brother of Emperor Ming of Han. After becoming Prince of Chu, he was a known supporter of many religions. In particular, his sponsorship of Buddhism in 65 CE is the first documented case of Buddhist practices in China.

Born to Lady Xu (Chinese: 許氏), a junior consort of Emperor Guangwu with the rank of meiren, Liu Ying was given the rank of duke on 22 May 39 CE, and prince (wáng) in the second half of 41 CE. The next year, he received Chu as his hereditary fiefdom, with his capital at Pengcheng (modern Xuzhou, Jiangsu). The young Liu Ying seems to have been close to his half-brother Liu Zhuang, the future Emperor Ming. He is also said to have travelled widely and gained an interest in Huang-Lao Daoism (Chinese: 黃老) and Buddhism (Chinese: 浮屠, literally "Buddha"). After Liu Ying became a prince, he actively supported both religions in the hope of finding a drug of longevity or immortality.

Because of these activities, Liu Ying was suspected of treasonous intrigue and the subject of an imperial edict from Emperor Ming. The edict, which survives in the Book of the Later Han shows that at the time the Buddha was associated in the opinion of the Chinese imperial court with Daoism. He was treated like a god to whom sacrifices and fasting took place. Buddhism was described as "humane" and generally accepted by the elite. Citing Liu Ying's support of Daoism and Buddhism, Henri Maspero noted, "It is a very curious fact that, throughout the whole Han dynasty, Taoism and Buddhism were constantly confused and appeared as a single religion."

Five years later, in c.December 70, Liu Ying's activities were again denounced by high officials and he was accused of plotting against the throne, a crime punishable by death. Among his supposed crimes was the most heinous of those in Han law: usurping the prerogatives of the emperor, and great impropriety and immorality in his conduct toward the throne (Chinese: 大逆不道). Nevertheless, Emperor Ming refused to execute Liu Ying, instead demoting him to the rank of a commoner and exiling him to Danyang in the lower Yangtze. Liu Ying committed suicide upon reaching his destination the next year. He was buried with the honours of a full marquess (Chinese: 侯).

As part of the purges following Liu Ying's downfall, thousands of his supposed adherents were arrested and implicated each other under torture. Nevertheless, the Buddhist community at Pengcheng survived. More than a century later, it was still thriving under the patronage of Ze Rong, a native of Danyang. A number of Liu Ying's followers may also have followed him to the lower Yangtze and established Buddhist communities there also.

== See also ==
- Yuan An
