= Liu Wu, Prince of Chu =

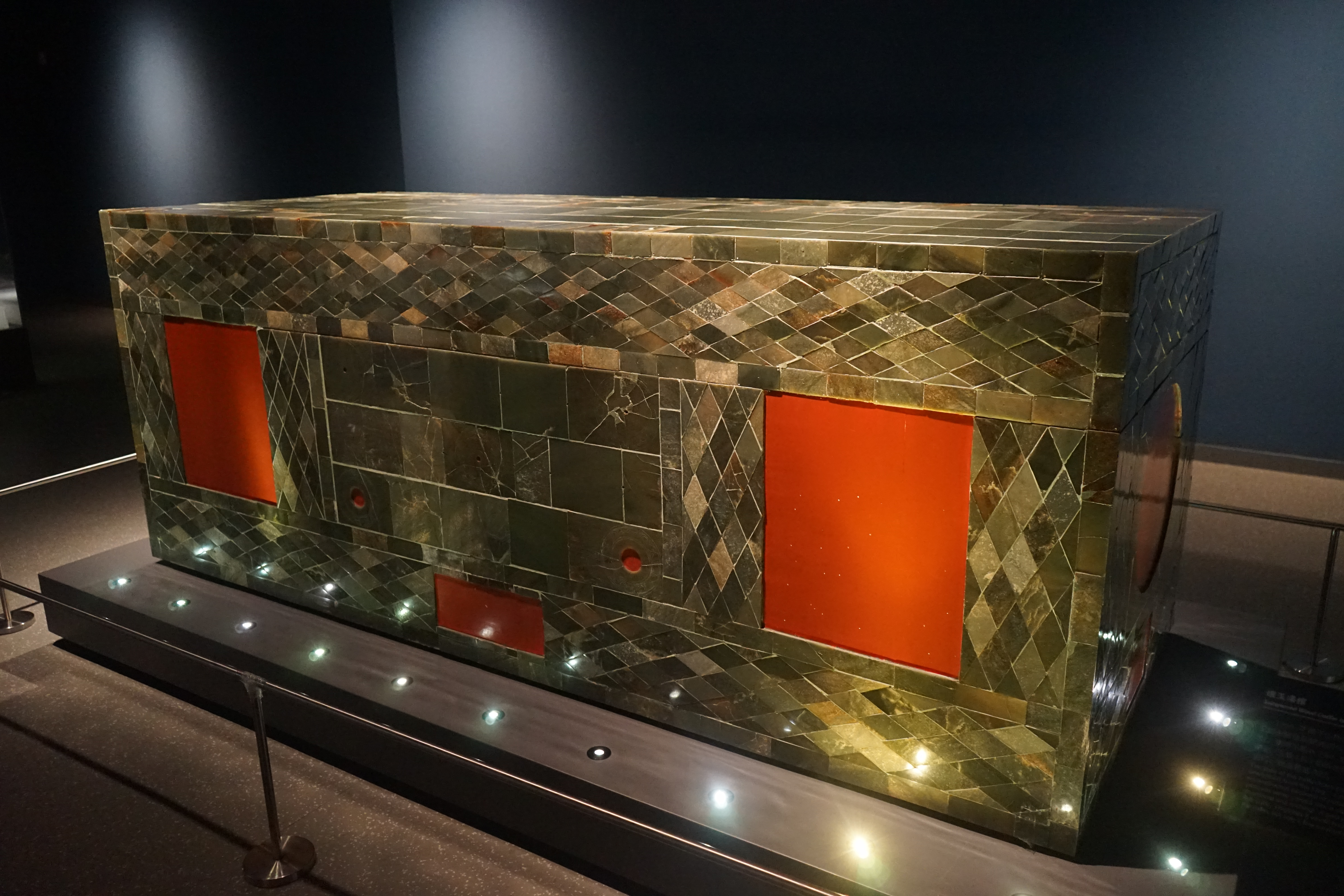
The coffin of prince Liu Wu, covered with jade panels. Unearthed from Shizishan Mountain (狮子山) in 1996

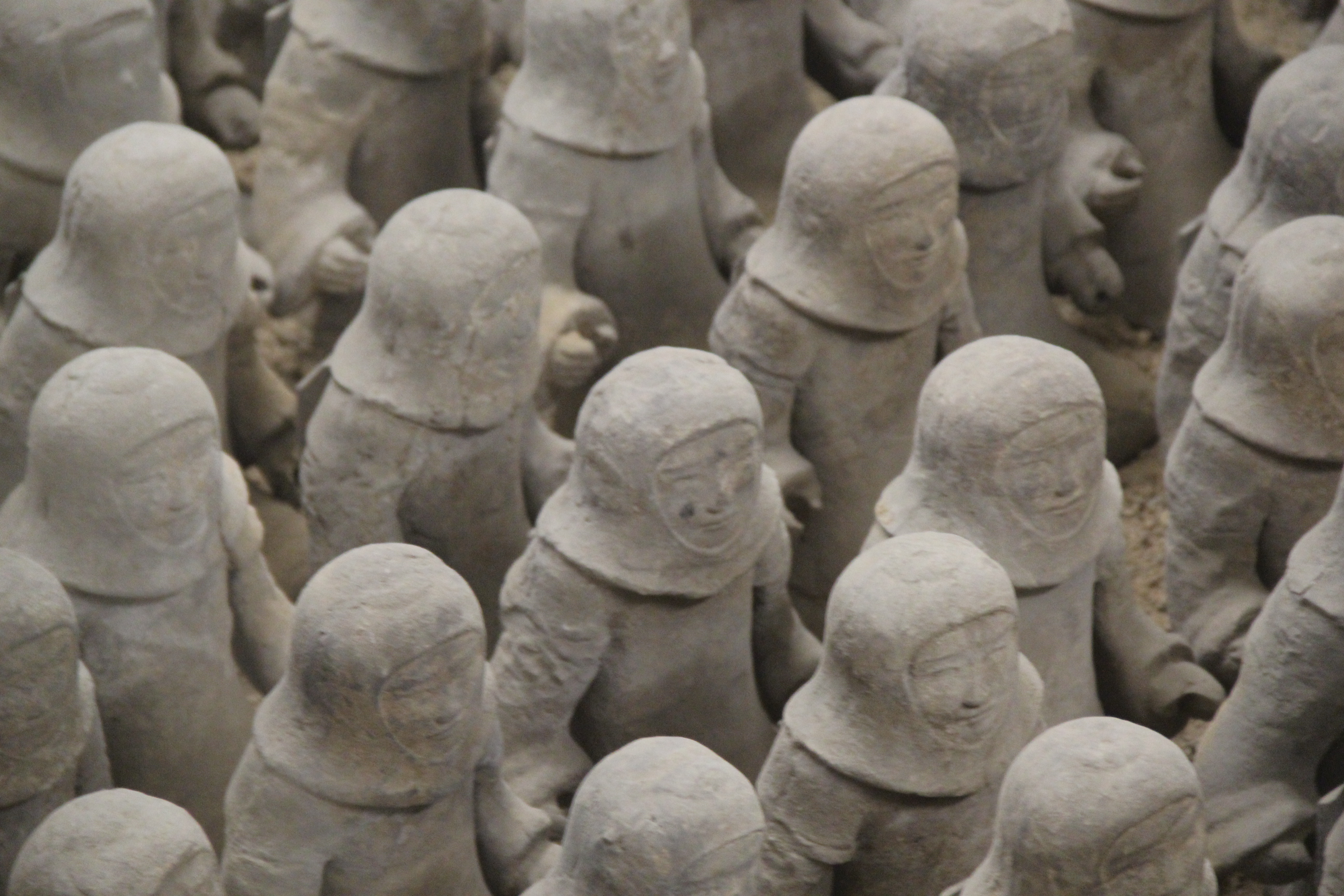
Terracotta warriors, Pit 1, Han Tomb of Liu Wu, King of Chu

Liu Wu (simplified Chinese: 刘戊; traditional Chinese: 劉戊; pinyin: Liú Wù, died 154 BC) was the son of Liu Yingke, Prince Yi of Chu, and grandson of Liu Jiao, Prince Yuan of Chu. After the short reign of his father, he inherited the title Prince of Chu in 174 BC. In 155 BC, Empress Dowager Bo, grandmother of Emperor Jing, died. Liu Wu was caught drinking during the grieving period, so Emperor Jing reduced the size of his fiefdom. Wu was later convinced to join the Rebellion of the Seven States by Liu Pi despite objections from his prime minister and tutor. Liu Wu put both of them to death.

In 154 BC, he launched his campaign against the principality of Liang but was defeated by Zhou Yafu. When the remaining troops surrendered and his supplies were cut off, Wu committed suicide. His son Liu Li was allowed to succeed to the Prince of Chu title despite the rebellion. He had a granddaughter named Princess Jieyou.

Prince of Chu House of Liu Died: 154 BC
Chinese royalty
| Preceded by Liu Yingke | Prince of Chu; 174 BC – 154 BC | Succeeded by Liu Li |
