= Liu Yingke =

Liu Yingke (Chinese: 劉郢客; pinyin: Liǘ Yǐngkè; died 174 BC), posthumous name Prince Yi of Chu (楚夷王), was an imperial prince of China's Western Han dynasty and a ruler of the fief of Chu. He was a nephew of Emperor Gaozu of Han and a son of Liu Jiao (Prince Yuan of Chu). He inherited the fief after his father died in 178 BC. In 174 BC, he died of a sudden illness, and his son Liu Wu inherited the principality from him.

Prince Yi of Chu House of Liu Died: 174 BC
Chinese royalty
Preceded by Liu Jiao	Prince of Chu; 178 BC – 174 BC	Succeeded by Liu Wu
