= Liu Jiao (prince) =

Brother of Emperor Gaozu of Han

Liu Jiao (Chinese: 劉交; died c. April 179 BC), courtesy name You (游), posthumous name Prince Yuan of Chu (楚元王), was a younger full brother of Emperor Gaozu of Han, the founder of the Han dynasty, and a famous scholar. Emperors of the Liu Song dynasty claimed descent from Liu Jiao.

== Biography ==
In early life, he studied at the Qin capital Xianyang as a scholar, and left after the Burning of books and burying of scholars event. After Han Xin was demoted from Prince of Chu to Marquis of Huaiyin in 201 BC, Emperor Gaozu divided the existing Chu territory into Chu and Jing. Among the four brothers of Emperor Gaozu, Jiao was most trusted; he was made Prince of Chu, while a clan member Liu Jia was made Prince of Jing. In c.April 179 BC, during the reign of his nephew Emperor Wen of Han, Jiao died and his second son, Liu Yingke inherited the title of Prince of Chu. Jiao's grandson, Liu Wu was one of the rebel princes in the Rebellion of the Seven States.

== Family ==
- Parents
  - Liu Taigong
  - Lady Liu (Liu Ao)
- Siblings
  - Liu Bang, Emperor Gaozu of Han
  - Empress Zhao'ai
- Descendant
  - Liu Yu, Emperor Wu of Liu Song
  - Liu Laozhi, Eastern Jin general

Prince Yuan of Chu House of Liu Died: 178 BC
Chinese royalty
Preceded by Han Xin as King of Chu	Prince of Chu; 201 BC – 178 BC	Succeeded by Liu Yingke
