= Chu Kingdom (Han dynasty) =

Kingdom of China's Han dynasty

Chu (Chinese: 楚; pinyin: Chǔ) was a kingdom of China's Han dynasty, located in what is now northern Jiangsu and Anhui provinces.

== History ==
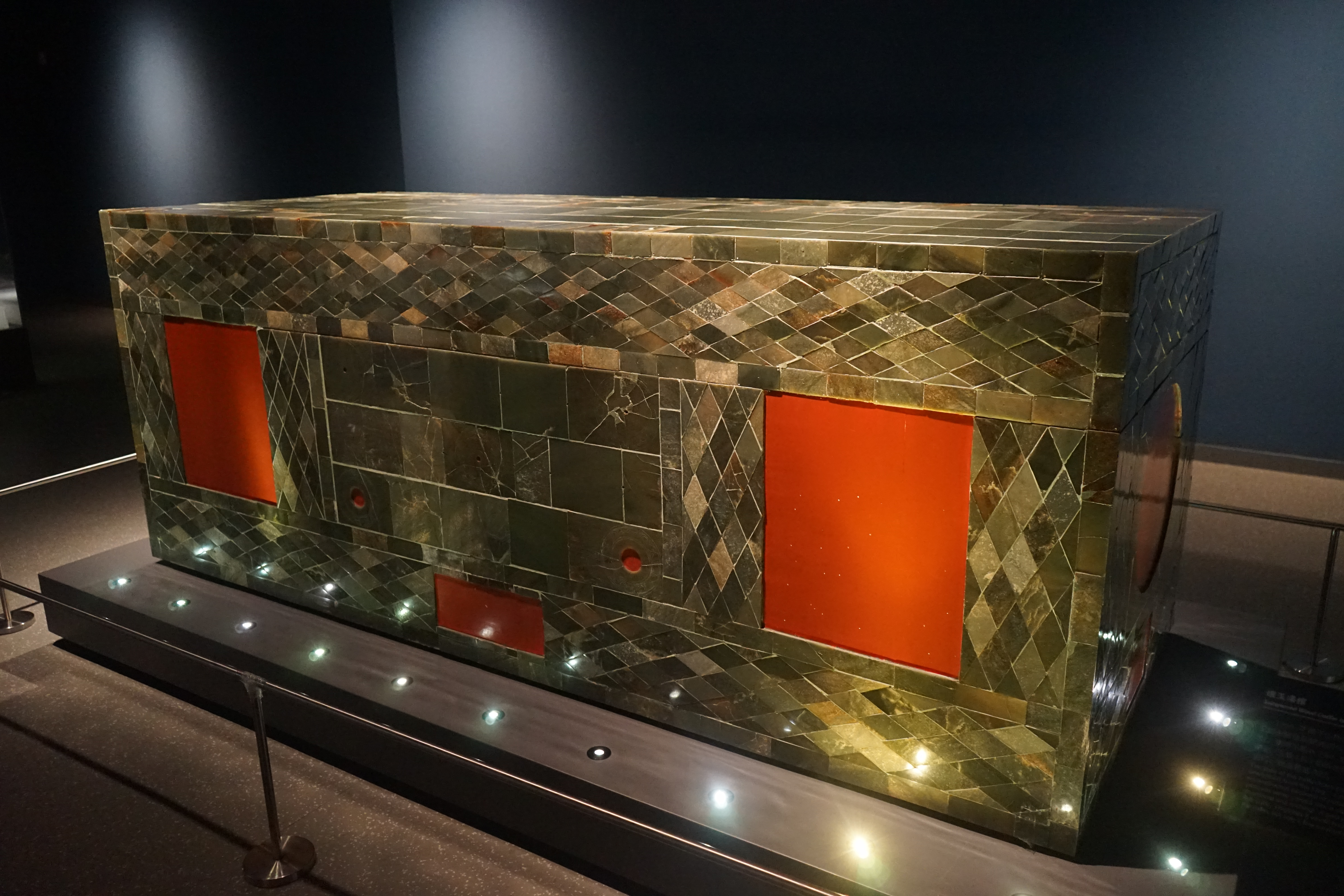
The coffin of prince Liu Wu, covered with jade panels. Unearthed from Shizishan Mountain (狮子山) in 1996

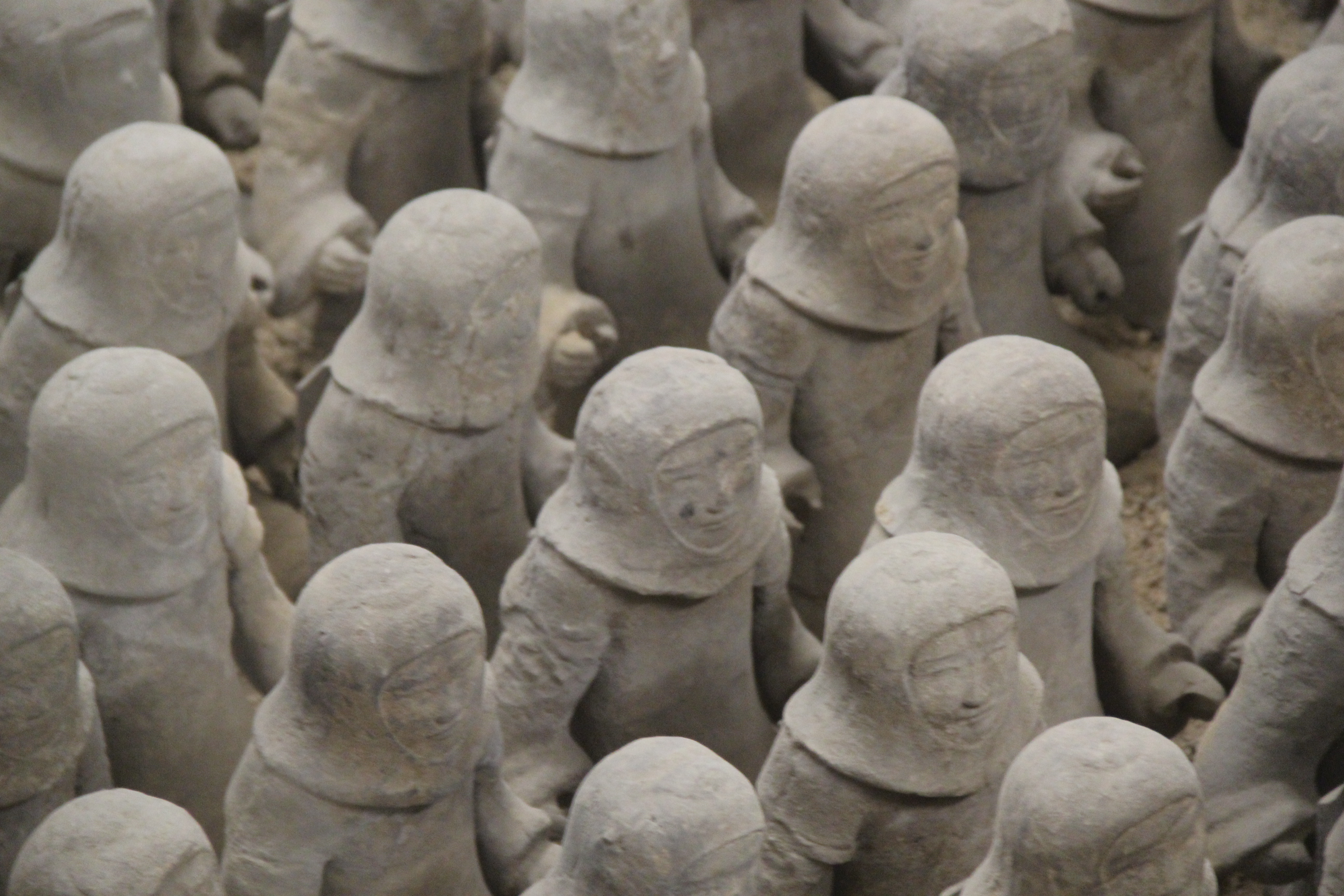
Terracotta warriors, Pit 1, Han Tomb of Liu Wu, King of Chu

During the Chu–Han Contention period, the Chu region centered in Pengcheng was the base of the Western Chu regime led by Xiang Yu. After Xiang's death, the Emperor Gaozu of Han first granted Chu to his general Han Xin. After Han was accused of plotting rebellion and executed, his territories was split into two parts. Liu Jiao, brother of the emperor, gained the title "King of Chu" and ruled over the land west of the Huai River, while the rest of Han Xin's territories eventually became the Wu Kingdom. Jiao's kingdom consisted of the commanderies of Xue, Pengcheng and Donghai. In 187 BC, Xue was split off to form the Lu Kingdom (魯國) for Zhang Yan (張偃), a grandson of the Empress Dowager Lü. The commandery was returned to Chu when the Lü clan was removed from power.

In 154 BC, Chu under the King Liu Wu joined the Rebellion of the Seven States as one of its leading participants. After the rebellion was quelled and Wu killed, Chu passed to his son Liu Li (劉禮), although its territory was reduced to several counties near the capital Pengcheng. In 69 BC, the king Liu Yanshou committed suicide for a conspiracy, and the kingdom was abolished. In 51 BC, it was reestablished under Liu Xiao (劉囂), a son of the Emperor Xuan. Xiao's lineage held the kingdom until being deposed during Wang Mang's usurpation. In early Eastern Han, Chu was granted to Liu Ying. Ying was stripped of his title during Emperor Ming's reign, and the region was subsequently administered as the Chu Commandery.

In late Western Han period, the kingdom administered 7 counties: Pengcheng, Liu (留), Wu (梧), Fuyang (傅陽), Lü (呂), Wuyuan (武原) and Ziqiu (甾丘). The total population was 497,084 individuals, or 114,738 households.

== Kings ==
| Name | In Chinese | Posthumous name | In Chinese | Reigned from | Reigned to |
|---|---|---|---|---|---|
| Liu Jiao | 劉交 | King Yuan of Chu | 楚元王 | 201 BC | 178 BC |
| Liu Yingke | 劉郢客 | King Yi of Chu | 楚夷王 | 178 BC | 174 BC |
| Liu Wu | 劉戊 | – | – | 174 BC | 154 BC |
| Liu Li | 劉禮 | King Wen of Chu | 楚文王 | 154 BC | 151 BC |
| Liu Dao | 劉道 | King An of Chu | 楚安王 | 151 BC | 129 BC |
| Liu Zhu | 劉注 | King Xiang of Chu | 楚襄王 | 129 BC | 117 BC |
| Liu Chun | 劉純 | King Jie of Chu | 楚节王 | 117 BC | 101 BC |
| Liu Yanshou | 劉延壽 | – | – | 101 BC | 69 BC |
| Liu Xiao | 劉囂 | King Xiao of Chu | 楚孝王 | 51 BC | 25 BC |
| Liu Wen | 劉文 | King Huai of Chu | 楚怀王 | 25 BC | 24 BC |
| Liu Yan | 劉衍 | King Si of Chu | 楚思王 | 24 BC | 2 BC |
| Liu Yu | 劉紆 | – | – | 2 BC | 8 AD |
| Liu Ying | 劉英 | – | – | 41 AD | 70 AD |
