= Han Xin =

Chinese military general and politician (?–196 BCE)

Han Xin 韓信
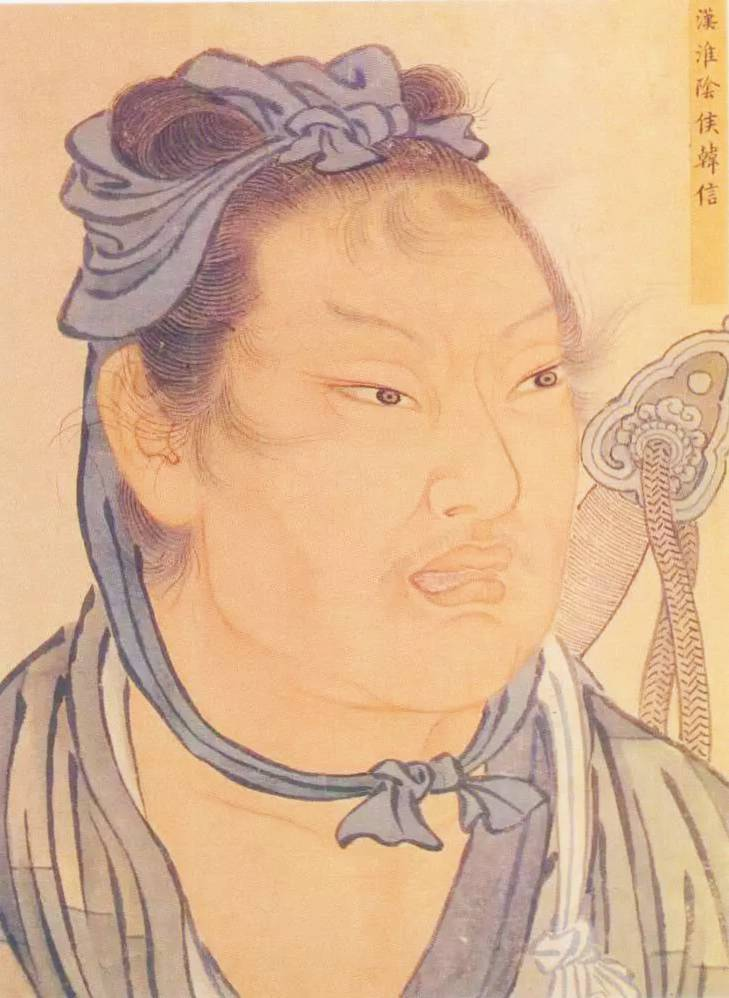
- Portrait of Marquis of Huaiyin, a Qing dynasty work, collected in the Palace Museum, Beijing

Marquis of Huaiyin
- Reign: 201 – 196 BC

King of Chu
- Reign: 202 – 201 BC
- Predecessor: Xiang Yu
- Successor: Liu Jiao

King of Qi
- Reign: 203 – 202 BC
- Predecessor: Tian Guang
- Successor: Liu Fei

Chancellor of State
- In office 204 BC
- Monarch: Liu Bang

Left Chancellor
- In office 205 BC
- Monarch: Liu Bang

Grand General
- In office 206 – 202 BC
- Monarchs: Liu Bang
Other offices held
Commandant for Grain
In office 206 BC
Monarch	Liu Bang
Captain of the Palace Guards
In office 208 – 206 BC
Monarch	Xiong Xin

Personal details
- Born: 231 BC Huaiyin (modern-day Huai'an District, Huai'an Prefecture, Jiangsu Province)
- Died: c. March 196 BC Changle Palace, Chang'an (modern-day Weiyang District, Xi'an, Shaanxi Province)

Military service
- Allegiance: Chu (208–206 BC); Han (206–202 BC)
- Rank: Grand General
- Battles/wars: Chu–Han War; Battle of Anyi; Battle of Jingxing; Battle of Wei River; Battle of Gaixia

Han Xin (simplified Chinese: 韩信; traditional Chinese: 韓信; pinyin: Hán Xìn; Wade–Giles: Han^{2}Hsin^{4}; 231 – c. March 196 BC) was a Chinese military general and politician who served Liu Bang during the Chu–Han Contention and contributed greatly to the founding of the Han dynasty. Han Xin was named as one of the "Three prominences of the early Han dynasty" (Chinese: 漢初三傑), along with Zhang Liang and Xiao He.

Han Xin is best remembered as one of the most brilliant military commanders in Chinese history, renowned for his exceptional strategic intellect and tactical mastery. His innovative use of deception, maneuver warfare, and battlefield psychology set new standards in military art, with several of his campaigns serving as textbook examples of effective command. Han Xin's application of warfare principles not only exemplified but at times expanded upon the teachings of The Art of War, with some of his tactics giving rise to enduring Chinese idioms. Undefeated in every engagement he commanded, his victories were instrumental in the founding of the Han dynasty. For his extraordinary accomplishments, Han Xin earned the legendary title of "Xian of War" (兵仙) in later Chinese tradition.

In recognition of Han Xin's contributions, Liu Bang conferred the titles of "King of Qi" on him in 203 BCE and "King of Chu" in the following year. However, Liu Bang feared Han Xin's growing influence and gradually reduced his power, demoting him to "Marquis of Huaiyin" in late 202 BCE. In early 196 BCE, Han Xin was accused of participating in a rebellion, lured into a trap and executed in Hall of Zhong (鐘室), Changle Palace, on Empress Lü's orders, and his three clans were exterminated.

== Early life ==
=== Commoner from Huaiyin ===
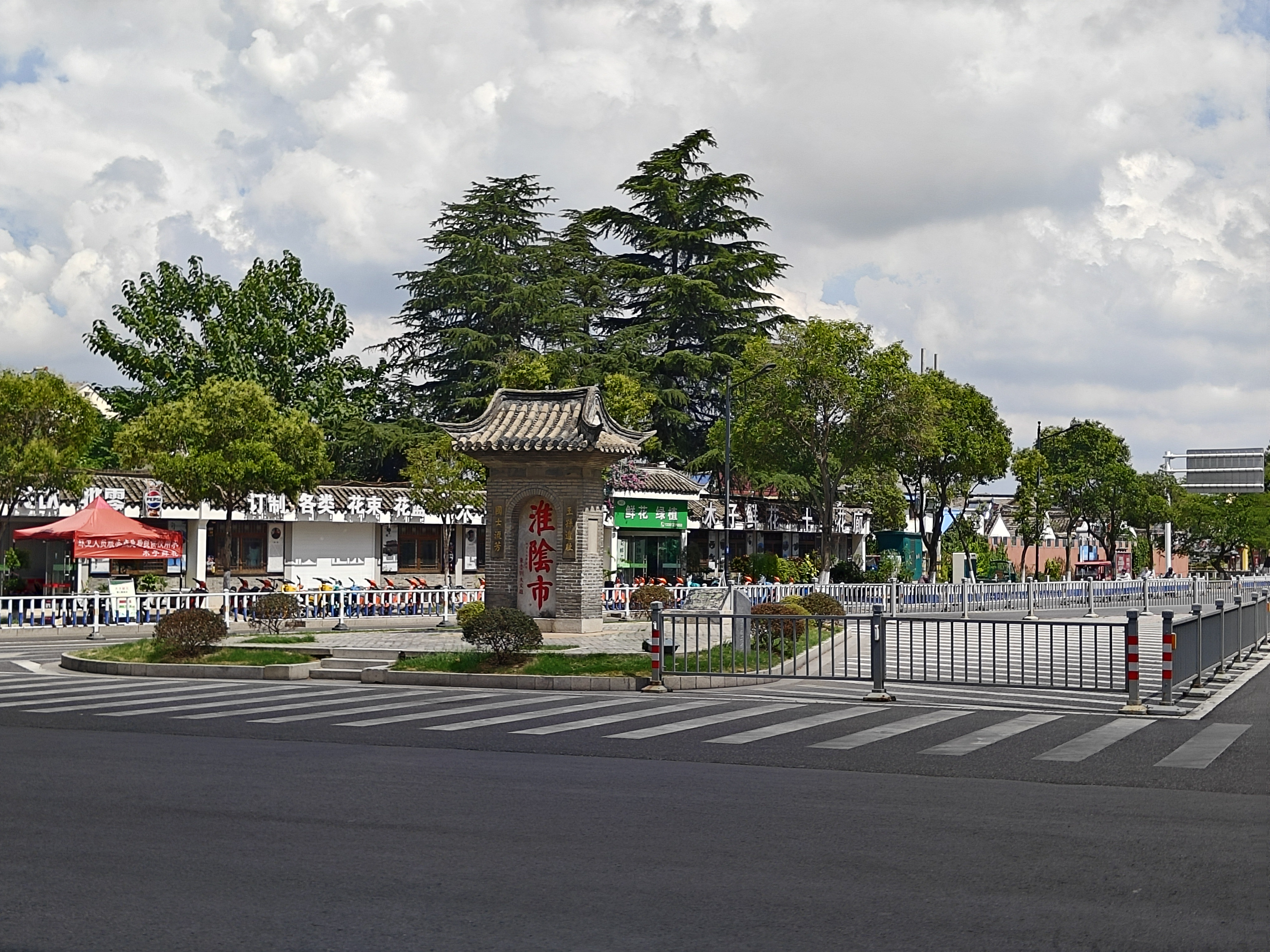
The Huaiyin City Stele (淮阴市碑) was erected during the Xuande era of Ming dynasty by local mayor Wang Tingqi (王廷器) to commemorate Han Xin, who was born here and enfeoffed as the Marquis of Huaiyin. The upper inscription reads "Site Bequeathed by a Prince", and the lower inscription "The Everlasting Fame of a National Hero". On the reverse is engraved "Birthplace of Han Xin, Marquis of Huaiyin of the Han Dynasty".

Han Xin was born in Huaiyin (modern-day Huai'an District, Huai'an Prefecture, Jiangsu Province), which was an area of Chu during the warring states. According to legend, he may have been a descendant of the Han clan of the Han Kingdom, but he was incredibly poor. The people from his hometown say that when his mother died, he did not have enough money to give her a proper burial. Regardless, he still searched until he came across a high and raised plot of land, thinking that one day, he could settle ten thousand households here to live and guard over his mother's grave.

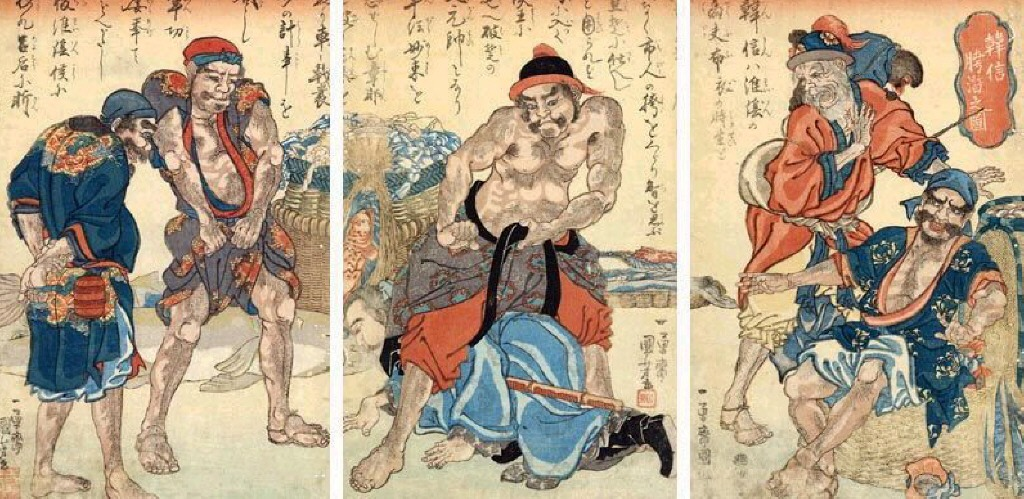
Ukiyo-e print of Han Xin crawling under a hooligan's crotch

Because he was unable to obtain a government post nor become a merchant, he lived a life of destitution and was despised by those around him, as he often relied on others for his meals. He especially often went to the Chief of Pavillion (亭長) of Nanchang Pavilion for food, and as months passed the Chief's wife increasing began to hate Han Xin. At one point, she cooked and ate very early in the morning, so that when Han Xin arrived, there was no more food. Han Xin understood that he was no longer welcome and never visited them again.

Once, when he was suffering from hunger, he met an old woman washing clothes by the river who provided him food. She did so for all the dozen days that she had laundry to do. Han Xin was incredibly delighted and promised to heavily repay her for her kindness. She, however, scolded him, saying: "A young man such as you cannot feed himself. I take pity that you are a descendant of nobility and so I feed you. I did not do so expecting anything in return!"

A youngster from a butcher's family in Huaiyin would humiliate Han Xin, making fun of him by saying that despite Han Xin being tall and carrying around a sword, Han Xin was actually a coward. He said in front of a crowd: "If you do not fear death; stab me. If you fear death; come crawl between my legs." Han Xin gave it some thought, and eventually decided to crawl between the hooligan's legs. Because of this, he was mocked by all the town for his cowardice.

Several years later, after becoming the King of Chu, Han Xin returned to his hometown. He found the woman who fed him and rewarded her with 1,000 taels of gold. He found the Chief of Nanchang Pavilion and gave him a hundred coins, saying, "You are not a good person. You do good things but your generosity is limited." Han Xin also found the hooligan and appointed the hooligan as a zhongwei (中尉; equivalent to a present-day lieutenant). He to his subordinates: "This man is a hero. Do you think I could not have killed him when he humiliated me? I would not become famous even if I killed him then. Hence, I endured the humiliation to preserve my life to achieve great things in the future."

=== Service under Xiang Yu ===
In 209 BC, Han Xin joined Xiang Liang's rebel army when rebellions erupted throughout China to overthrow the Qin dynasty. Han Xin continued serving Xiang Yu (Xiang Liang's nephew) after Xiang Liang was killed in action at the Battle of Dingtao. He was not placed in high regard and worked as a langzhong (郎中; sometimes translated as Captain of the Palace Guards). He constantly proposed strategies to Xiang Yu but was ignored. During this time, he became well acquainted with Zhongli Mo, one of Xiang Yu's top generals.

In 206 BC, Han Xin deserted Xiang Yu's army and went to join Liu Bang.

== War against Chu ==
=== Investiture as the commander-in-chief ===
Generals may be readily obtained; yet one such as Han Xin is without equal in the country.

— Xiao He, 206 BC

Initially, after joining Liu Bang's army, Han Xin was not given any important roles. Once, he violated military law and was due to be punished by execution. When it was his turn to be beheaded, Han Xin saw Xiahou Ying (one of Liu Bang's trusted generals) and said, "I thought the King wanted to rule an empire. Why, then, is he killing valiant men?" Xiahou Ying was surprised by his words and his looks, and spared Han Xin's life. After conversing with Han Xin, Xiahou Ying was greatly delighted and recommended Han Xin to Liu Bang. Liu Bang was not overly impressed but made Han Xin the Commandant for Grains (治粟都尉) to be in charge of food supplies. During this time, Han Xin often met up with Xiao He (Liu Bang's Chancellor), who was greatly impressed by him.

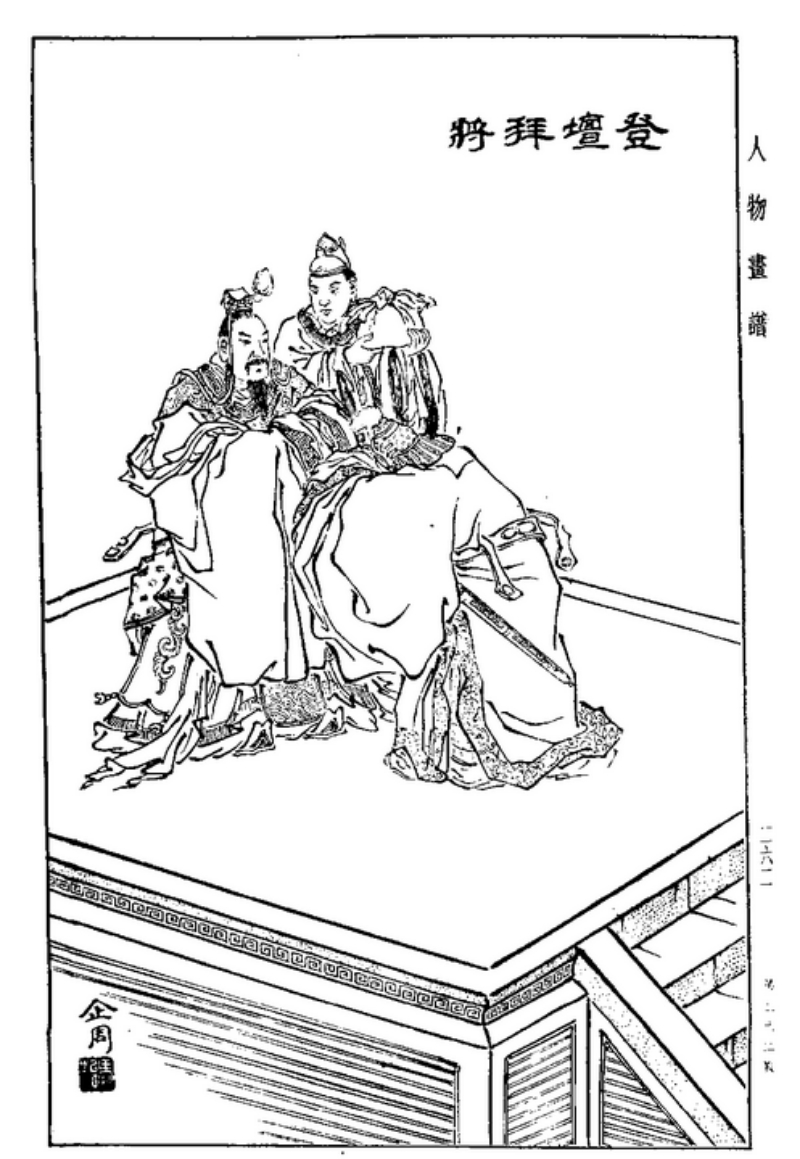
Built the Altar and Appointed Han Xin as the Grand General, by Ma Tai (馬駘)

In April of that year, Liu Bang faced a mass desertion of soldiers. Han Xin figured that despite both Xiahou Ying and Xiao He having recommended him to Liu Bang, Liu Bang did not use him, so he saw no reason to stay and also deserted. When Xiao He heard that Han Xin had left, he immediately rushed to personally find Han Xin and bring him back, and did not manage to inform Liu Bang in time. Xiao He eventually caught up with Han Xin and managed to persuade Han Xin to go back with him. This event gave rise to the saying, "Xiao He chases Han Xin under the moonlight" (蕭何月下追韓信). In the meantime, Liu Bang had a nervous breakdown after hearing that Xiao He had left him. When Xiao He returned after a few days, while Liu Bang was relieved, he was also furious. He angrily asked Xiao He, "Why did you run away?" Xiao He explained, "I did not run away; I was chasing down Han Xin." Liu Bang got angry again, saying, "There were dozens of deserters, yet you did not chase after them. When you say that you chased after Han Xin, you must be lying to me." Xiao He then explained Han Xin's talent and forcibly insisted that Liu Bang immediately promote Han Xin to the highest rank in the army, the Grand General (大將軍). Xiao He also chided Liu Bang's usual ill-mannered behaviour, demanding that Liu Bang hold a formal ceremony for the event. Liu Bang relented and held a special ceremony for Han Xin's appointment.

=== Reconquering the Three Qins ===
After the ceremony, Han Xin analysed the situation for Liu Bang and devised a plan to conquer Xiang Yu's Western Chu kingdom. In late 206 BCE, Liu Bang's forces left Hanzhong and prepared to attack the Three Qins in Guanzhong. Han Xin ordered some soldiers to pretend to repair the gallery roads linking Guanzhong and Hanzhong, while sending another army to secretly pass through Chencang and make a surprise attack on Zhang Han. Zhang Han was caught off guard and the Han forces emerged victorious, proceeding to take over Sima Xin and Dong Yi's kingdoms. The strategy employed by Han Xin, known as mingxiu zhandao, andu Chencang (明修棧道, 暗度陳倉; lit. "appearing to repair the gallery roads while making secret advances through Chencang"), later became one of the Thirty-Six Stratagems.

=== Crushing other kingdoms ===
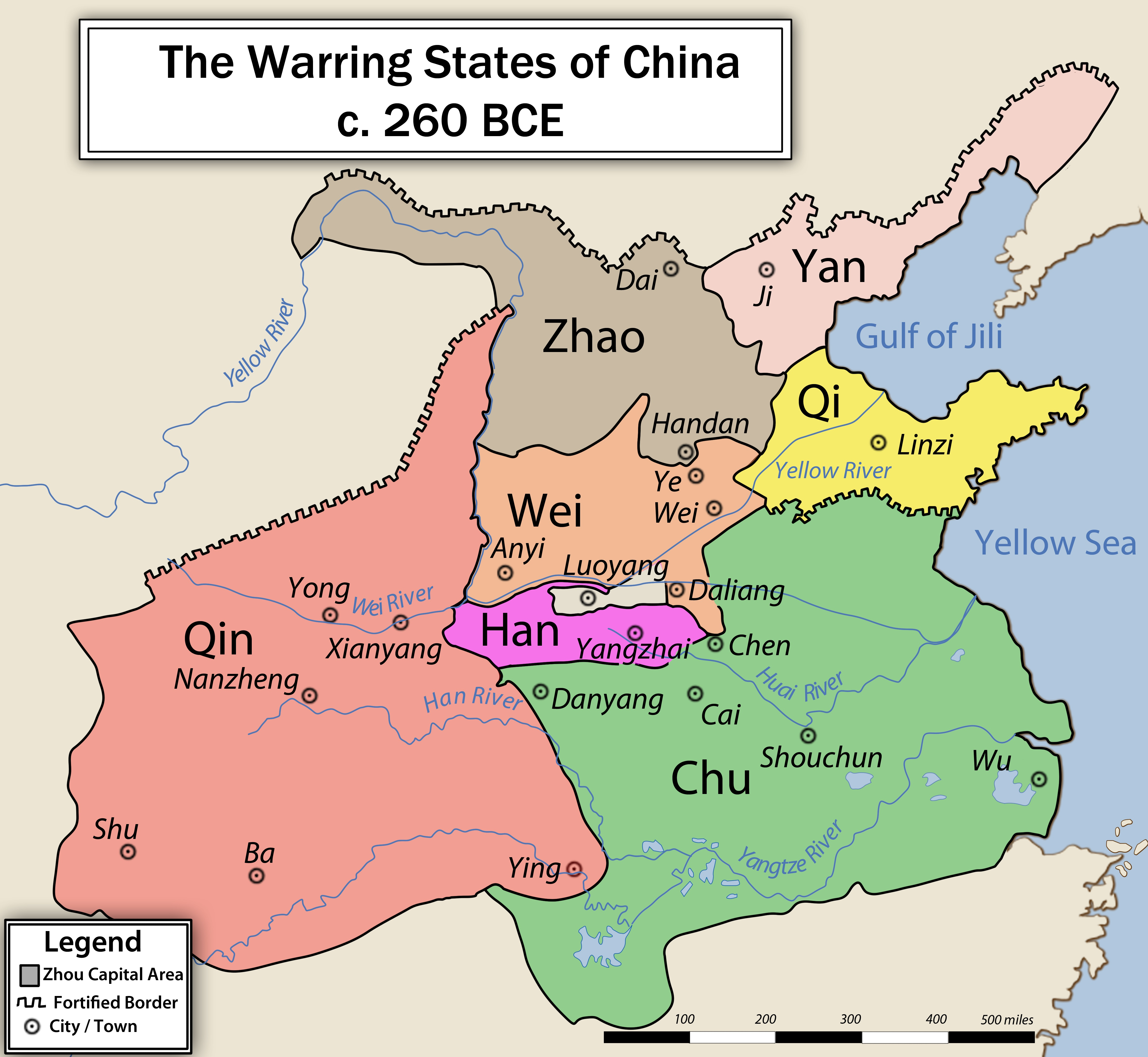
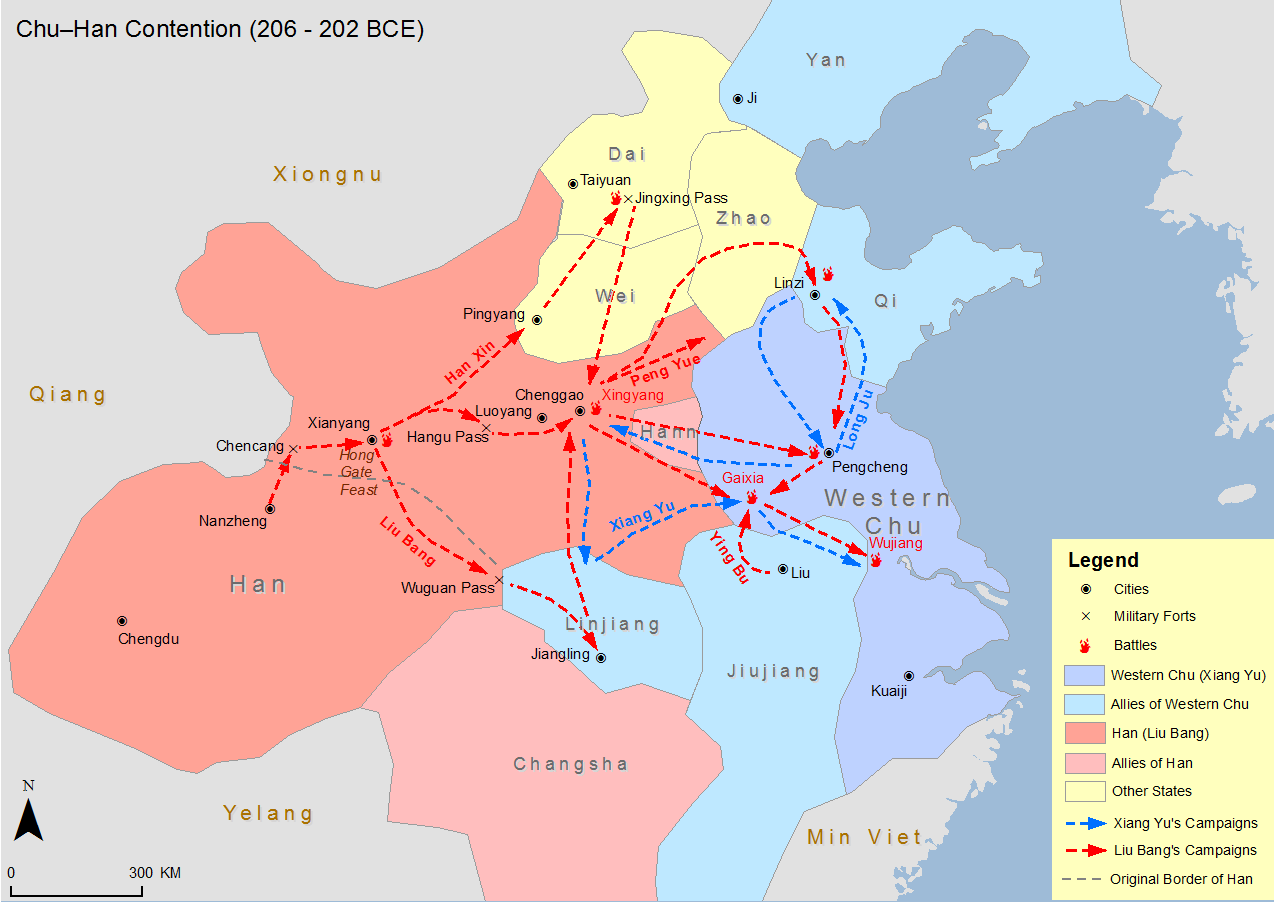
Major kingdoms of China during the late Warring States period (left). After the collapse of Qin, all six kingdoms were restored by their nobilities, and Han Xin conquered and annexed the states of Qin, Wei, Dai, Zhao, Yan and Qi within two years.

Although the Guanzhong region had not yet been fully pacified, the overall situation was already settled. The King of Han, Liu Bang, therefore personally led his main army out through Hangu Pass, stationing his forces at Shan County (west of today's Sanmenxia, Henan), where he set about pacifying the people east of the passes. At this time, Zhang Liang, Minister of State of Han, Zhang Er, King of Changshan, and Shen Yang, King of Henan, successively came over to submit to Liu Bang, greatly strengthening the Han camp.

With Zhang Liang at the center, devising strategy and planning operations, Liu Bang felt that he could manage even without Han Xin. Thus, in the eleventh month he returned to Guanzhong, revoked Han Xin's command authority, and redeployed his forces and generals. Liu Bang himself led the main Han army together with the troops of the surrendering feudal lords eastward to campaign against Western Chu. Xiao He and Han Xin, one civil and one military, remained behind to guard Guanzhong: Xiao He was responsible for restoring local administration, reviving production, and levying men from among the former Qin populace to form a new army, while Han Xin was tasked with training this new force and eliminating the remaining troops of the former Qin kings.

Liu Bang then allied with the other eighteen feudal lords and, while Xiang Yu was still in the state of Qi, led a coalition army of 560,000 men in 205 BCE to seize Xiang Yu's capital, Pengcheng. Xiang Yu hurried back to Pengcheng with 30,000 troops. Liu Bang was unable to withstand him and suffered a disastrous defeat at the Battle of Pengcheng, retreating to Xingyang. Xiao He immediately mobilized the elderly, the infirm, and those not yet registered for service in Guanzhong and led them to rendezvous with the King of Han at Xingyang. Han Xin gathered scattered soldiers and also joined Liu Bang. Thereafter, Liu Bang ordered Guan Ying to reorganize the former Qin cavalry, appointing Li Bi and Luo Jia as his deputies. Liu Bang then appointed Guan Ying as Palace Grandee, with Li Bi and Luo Jia serving as Left and Right Colonels to assist him. Together they led the cavalry to engage the Chu cavalry east of Xingyang and succeeded in defeating Xiang Yu's forces.

The King of Wei, Wei Bao, defected to Chu and rebelled against Han. Liu Bang appointed Han Xin as Left Chancellor and entrusted him with command of the campaign against Wei. Cao Can served as infantry commander and Guan Ying as cavalry commander, both under Han Xin, and together they attacked Wei Bao. Wei Bao led his main forces to garrison Puban, blocking the Yellow River crossing at Linjin Pass. Han Xin deployed decoy troops and arrayed warships, feigning an attempt to cross at Linjin, while in fact leading his army to cross the river at Xiayang using wooden jars and earthenware containers. He then launched a surprise attack on the Wei capital, Anyang. Caught off guard, Wei Bao rushed out with his troops to meet Han Xin but was defeated; Han Xin pacified the territory of Wei, captured Wei Bao, and escorted him to Xingyang. Liu Bang subsequently established Hedong Commandery in the former Wei lands. After this campaign, Cao Can was granted the fief of Pingyang.

Afterward, Han Xin and others led their armies to defeat the state of Dai, capturing Xia Shuoyan at Yu. At the Battle of Jingxing, with his troops backed against the river, Han Xin used thirty thousand soldiers to defeat a Zhao army of two hundred thousand. Han Xin then followed the advice of Li Zuoche, Lord of Guangwu, dispatching envoys to the state of Yan and successfully persuading the King of Yan to submit to the King of Han.

=== Annexation of the north ===
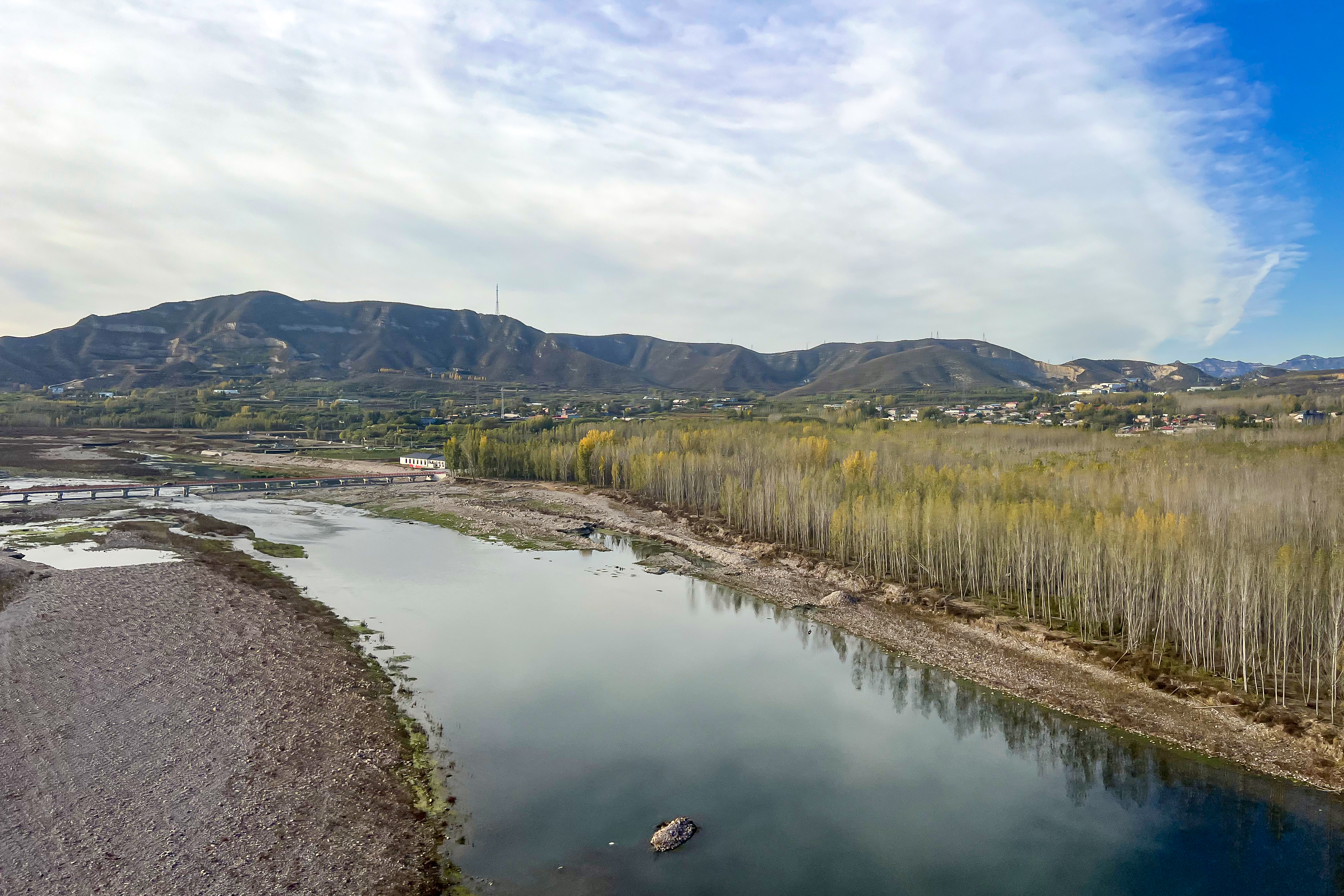
Ye River at Weizhou, Jingxing County, near the place where the Battle of Jingxing took place.

In the ninth month of the second year of Han (205 BCE), Han Xin and others captured Wei Bao, King of Wei, and pacified the Wei territories. In the intercalary ninth month of the same year, the armies of Han Xin and Zhang Er defeated the forces of the state of Dai and captured Xia Shuo (夏說) alive at Yu. After Han Xin had subdued Wei and Dai, Liu Bang dispatched envoys to transfer Han Xin's elite troops to Xingyang to confront the Chu forces.

In the winter, tenth month of the third year of Han (204 BCE), Han Xin sent envoys to request 30,000 troops from the King of Han, proposing to destroy Yan and Zhao in the north, strike Qi in the east, and sever Chu's supply routes in the south. Liu Bang approved the request and assigned troops to Han Xin. Upon hearing that the Han army was about to attack Zhao, King Xie of Zhao and Lord Cheng'an, Chen Yu, concentrated their forces at Jingxing Pass, claiming an army of 200,000.

Li Zuoche, Lord of Guangwu, advised Chen Yu that although the Han army was formidable, it had marched a thousand li and would be constrained by the narrow terrain of Jingxing Pass, inevitably causing its supply lines to lag behind the troops. He proposed that Chen Yu assign him 30,000 picked troops to move along hidden paths and intercept the Han army's supply convoys, while the King of Zhao should dig deep trenches, build high ramparts, and hold firm without engaging the enemy. Chen Yu, adhering to Confucian principles, was unwilling to employ deception and stratagems. Believing his forces outnumbered the enemy ten to one and fearing that avoiding battle would invite contempt from the other feudal lords, he rejected Li Zuoche's advice.

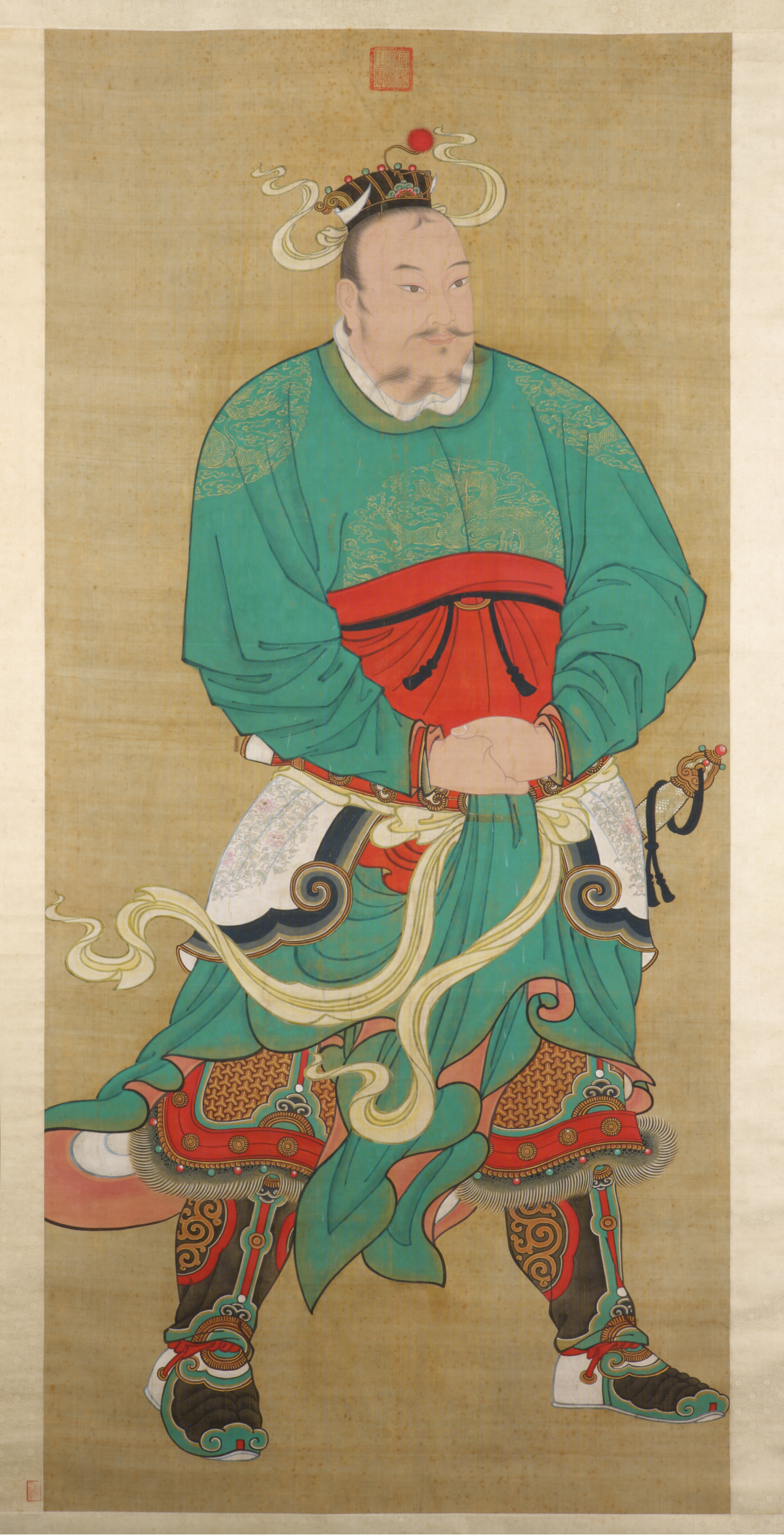
Hanging scroll portrait of Han Xin painted by a Ming-dynasty artist

Han Xin secretly gathered intelligence and learned that Chen Yu had not adopted Li Zuoche's plan. He then led his army into Jingxing Pass and halted to camp thirty li from the exit. At midnight, Han Xin selected two thousand lightly armed cavalrymen, each carrying a red banner, and sent them by concealed paths into the mountains, instructing them: "When the armies engage, the Zhao forces will see our troops feigning defeat and will pursue in full force. You are then to rush into the Zhao camp, remove their banners, and raise the Han red banners." Han Xin further told his officers, "The Zhao army has already fortified favorable ground. If they do not see our commander's banners and ceremonial standards, they will not attack our advance units, fearing that we might withdraw once we reach dangerous terrain.”

Han Xin sent troops out of Jingxing Pass and arrayed them with their backs to the river. When the Zhao army saw this, they burst into laughter. At dawn, Han Xin raised the commander's banners, beat the war drums, and advanced out of the pass. The Zhao army finally opened their fortifications and attacked. After fierce fighting, Han Xin and Zhang Er feigned the abandonment of banners and drums and fled back toward the river formation. As anticipated, the Zhao forces pursued en masse, scrambling to seize the Han banners and drums and chasing the commanders.

At that moment, the two thousand cavalry previously dispatched by Han Xin charged into the now-empty Zhao camp, replacing the Zhao banners with Han red banners. Unable to overcome the Han troops fighting with their backs to the river, the Zhao army attempted to retreat, only to discover their camp filled with Han banners. Shocked and believing their generals had been captured, the Zhao forces fell into chaos and scattered in flight. Even executions by Zhao officers failed to stop the rout. The Han army then attacked from front and rear, utterly crushing the Zhao forces, capturing large numbers of troops, killing Chen Yu by the Zhi River, and taking King Xie of Zhao alive.

After the great victory, Han Xin issued orders forbidding the killing of Li Zuoche. When Li Zuoche was captured alive, Han Xin treated him with the respect due to a teacher. Li Zuoche advised that the Han army, having come from afar, should not continue fighting but instead stabilize Zhao, care for its people, and rest the troops, while taking advantage of the victory to persuade Yan to surrender. Han Xin accepted this advice and sent envoys to Yan, which indeed surrendered upon hearing the news. Han Xin then reported to Liu Bang and requested that Zhang Er be installed as King of Zhao to pacify the region. Liu Bang approved and enfeoffed Zhang Er as King of Zhao.

Chu repeatedly dispatched surprise forces across the Yellow River to attack Zhao. Zhang Er and Han Xin frequently coordinated relief efforts, and while maneuvering their troops, they seized all Zhao cities along their route, thereafter sending forces to support the King of Han.

In the twelfth month of the third year of Han (204 BCE), Sui He successfully persuaded Ying Bu to submit to Han, whereupon Ying Bu raised troops to attack Chu. Chu sent Xiang Sheng and Long Ju to attack Ying Bu, who suffered defeat. Ying Bu and Sui He then took hidden paths to seek aid from Liu Bang. Liu Bang dispatched reinforcements, and together they withdrew to Chenggao. Chu forces again swiftly besieged Chenggao.

In the sixth month, Liu Bang escaped from Chenggao with Xiahou Ying, crossed the Yellow River eastward, and arrived at the camp of Zhang Er's army at Xiuwu. At dawn the next day, Liu Bang entered the Zhao camp claiming to be an envoy of the King of Han. While Zhang Er and Han Xin were still asleep, Liu Bang entered their quarters, seized their seals and tallies, summoned the generals, and reassigned their commands. When Zhang Er and Han Xin awoke and learned that Liu Bang had already come and gone, they were greatly alarmed.

Liu Bang took over their troops, ordered Zhang Er to remain and defend Zhao, appointed Han Xin as Chancellor of State, and instructed him to gather the Zhao troops not transferred to Xingyang and lead them in a battle against Qi.

=== Enfeoffment as King of Qi ===
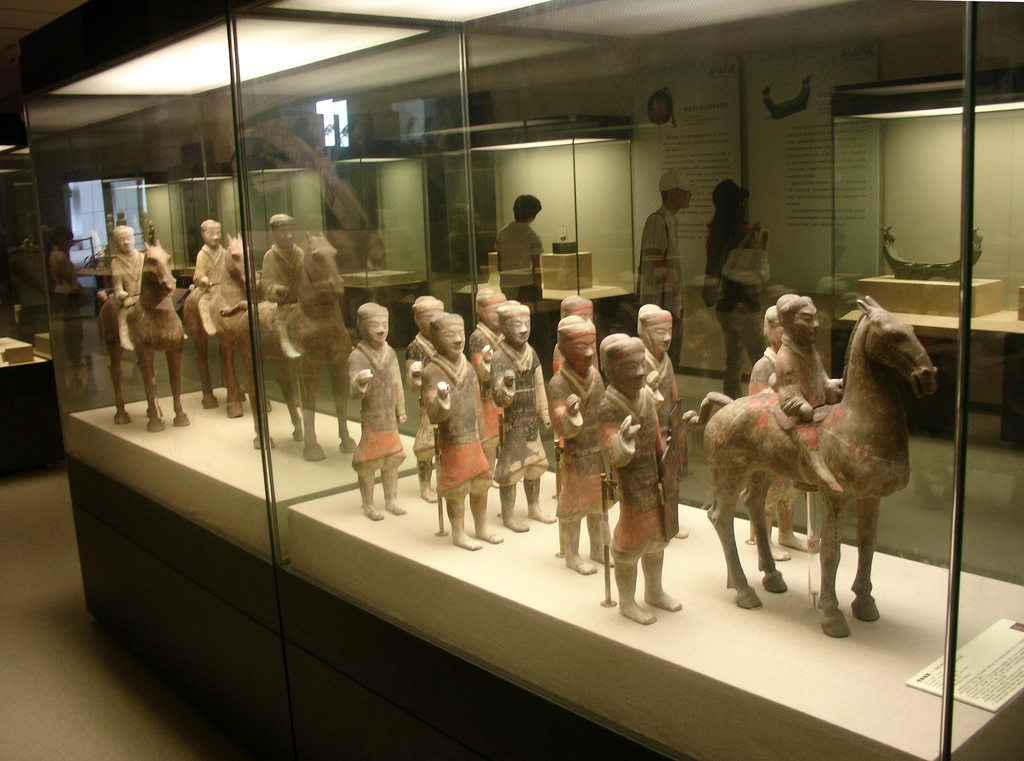
Ceramic statues of Han cavalrymen and infantrymen, Hainan Museum, Haikou

In 204 BCE, Liu Bang dispatched Li Yiji to persuade the state of Qi (today's Shandong province) to form an alliance. Tian Guang, King of Qi, agreed and retained Li Yiji with generous hospitality. Earlier, Han Xin had already received Liu Bang's orders to attack Qi. After learning that Li Yiji had successfully secured Qi's submission, Han Xin initially intended to withdraw his troops. However, Kuai Che argued that since Liu Bang had issued no edict ordering a retreat, Han Xin was obliged to carry out the original command and proceed with the campaign so as to eliminate Qi's military strength entirely. Han Xin accepted this reasoning and launched an attack on the unprepared Qi forces. Enraged upon hearing the news, Tian Guang had Li Yiji executed by boiling.

Han Xin, together with Guan Ying and Cao Can, defeated the Qi army. Tian Guang led his troops eastward in retreat and sought aid from Xiang Yu. Han Xin then joined forces with Chen Wu, Cai Yin, Ding Fu, Wang Zhou, and Chen Juan, and defeated the combined armies of Tian Guang and the Chu general Long Ju; Long Ju was killed in battle. Han Xin subsequently occupied Qi territory in succession.

=== Final campaign against Chu ===
In 203 BCE, citing the unsettled popular sentiment in Qi, Han Xin requested appointment as Acting King of Qi (假齊王) so that he could govern the region effectively. At the time, Liu Bang was locked in a stalemate with the Chu forces. Upon hearing the request, he angrily exclaimed, “I am trapped here, waiting day and night for you to come to my rescue, and yet you want to make yourself king!” Zhang Liang and Chen Ping then stepped on Liu Bang's foot and whispered that the Han position was presently unfavorable and that it was impossible to prevent Han Xin from assuming kingship; it would be better to consent outright. Liu Bang immediately grasped the point and changed his tone, declaring, "If a true man can pacify the feudal lords, then he should be made a real king—what need is there for an 'acting' King of Qi?" He thereupon formally enfeoffed Han Xin as King of Qi.

Aware that the situation was turning against him, Xiang Yu sent Wu She to persuade Han Xin to defect from Han. Han Xin refused, citing Liu Bang's past kindness toward him. Kuai Che, however, believed that Liu Bang would eventually move against Han Xin and repeatedly urged him to seize the moment, break away from the Han king, and establish an independent power to create a tripartite balance. Han Xin, confident in his merits, insisted that “Han will never take Qi away from me." Kuai Che (蒯徹) warned in reply that "those whose valor and strategy make rulers feel threatened place their lives in danger; those who render world-shaking service often fail to receive their due rewards." Yet Han Xin steadfastly held to the belief that "Han will never betray me", and could not bring himself to rebel.

== After the establishment of Han dynasty ==
=== Destiny of the hunting dog ===
The hunting dog is cooked after the hare is captured, and a good bow is discarded when there are no birds left for shooting... Now that the county is settled, and it's my time to be cooked!

— Han Xin, 202 BC

When Xiang Yu died in 202 BCE, Zhongli Mo (one of Xiang Yu's generals) came to Han Xin and requested refuge. On account of their past friendship, Han Xin protected Zhongli Mo and let him stay with him. When Emperor Gaozu heard that Zhongli Mo was hiding in Han Xin's territory, he ordered Han to arrest Zhongli Mo, but Han Xin refused.

A year later, Gaozu heard rumours that Han Xin was plotting a rebellion. By this time, Zhang Liang had already retreated from political affairs, so Chen Ping was Gaozu's most trusted advisor. After discussion, they came to the conclusion that Gaozu could not best Han Xin in battle, so it would be most ideal to strike Han Xin when he was unprepared. Chen Ping proposed to lure Han Xin into meeting, on a pretext of Liu Bang touring the Yunmeng Marshes (present-day Jianghan Plains, Hubei Province). He sent this message out to all warlords across the land. When Han Xin heard that Gaozu was heading towards the land of Chu, his first instinct was to rebel, but he decided he had committed no crime and stayed put. At this time, someone told Han Xin that if he were to present Zhongli Mo's head to Gaozu, than he would be happy and spare him. Han Xin then met Zhongli Mo to decide their next course of action, and brought up this idea. Zhongli Mo then promptly slit his own throat, but not before claiming Han Xin would follow soon after. Han Xin brought Zhongli Mo's severed head to Gaozu and explained his innocence, but Gaozu ordered Han to be arrested. Han Xin exclaimed, "It is true when people say: The hunting dog is cooked after the hare is captured, and a good bow is discarded when there are no birds left for shooting; an advisor dies after he helps his lord conquer a rival kingdom. Now that the county is settled, and it's my time to be cooked!" Liu Bang's only response was: "Someone claimed you had rebelled", and proceeded to cuff Han Xin and bring him back to Luoyang. Although Gaozu pardoned Han Xin and released him later, he still demoted Han from "King of Chu" to "Marquis of Huaiyin".

=== Death and dispute over rebellion ===
After his demotion, Han Xin knew that Gaozu was beginning to distrust him and had become wary of his talent. Hence, Han Xin claimed to be ill and stayed at home most of the time to reduce Gaozu's suspicions. Around 197 BCE, Chen Xi (Marquis of Yangxia) met Han Xin before leaving for Julu, where Han Xin promptly pulled him aside, dismissing all nearby servants. He promised to aid Chen Xi from inside the capital if Chen Xi were to start an uprising against the Han dynasty. Not long after, Chen Xi rebelled and Gaozu personally led an army to suppress the rebellion, while Han Xin claimed sickness and stayed behind.

While Gaozu was away, one of Han Xin's household servants offended him, so Han Xin locked him up as punishment. The servant's young brother gave news of Han Xin's desire to rebel to Empress Lü, who then plotted with Xiao He to lure Han Xin into a trap. They pretended Gaozu had returned from suppressing the rebellion and that there would be a feast to commemorate the success. Xiao He managed to persuade Han Xin into coming to Changle Palace, where the Empress lived, and he was bound and executed as soon as he stepped through the doors. Han Xin's clan was exterminated on the Empress's orders as well. Upon return from his campaign, Gaozu expressed both relief and regret when he learnt of Han Xin's death. He asked the Empress for Han Xin's last words, which were, "I regret not listening to Kuai Che's advice, and now I have been deceived by such vile people. This is the will of heaven!"

In another section of Sima Qian's Shiji, "The Hereditary House of Chancellor Xiao", the events of the Chu-Han contention are told from Xiao He's point of view, and puts a different narrative on Han Xin's death. In this autobiography, Liu Bang was immediately notified of Han Xin's rebellion and execution, rather than waiting until after his return.

Throughout history, historians and scholars alike have debated over the plausibility of Han Xin's rebellion. Although the Shiji has it stated explicitly, many believe that Han Xin was loyal until his death. They believe that Lü Zhi and Xiao He framed Han Xin of treason, under the knowledge of Liu Bang, because Han Xin's reputation amongst the military was too high, and combined with his talents, became a threat to the throne. Although historians have always looked to Sima Qian's records for facts, some believe it is possible that as a citizen of the Han dynasty, he could not go against the government acknowledged version of events. A Tang dynasty poet, Xu Hun, once wrote a poem titled "The Shrine of Han Xin", in which it states that it is unlikely for Han Xin to stay loyal when he held military power, yet rebel when he had not a single soldier.

The historian Sima Zhen (司馬貞, 679-732) wrote a comment in his book Shiji Suoyin, upon the life and rebellion of Han Xin:

Unity between the ruler and minister has, since antiquity, been hard to attain.

君臣一體, 自古所難.
Yet the Chancellor earnestly recommended him, and by royal decree he was raised upon the altar.
相國深薦, 策拜登壇.
He sank the cauldrons and broke the dikes, seized the enemy banners and shared provisions with his troops.
沈沙決水, 拔幟傳餐.
With Han, the Han grew mighty; with Chu, Chu found its peace.
與漢漢重, 歸楚楚安.
The realm might well have been divided three parts, yet that was never debated makes his feigned defection all the more lamentable.

三分不議, 偽游可嘆.

== Legacy ==
=== Idioms ===
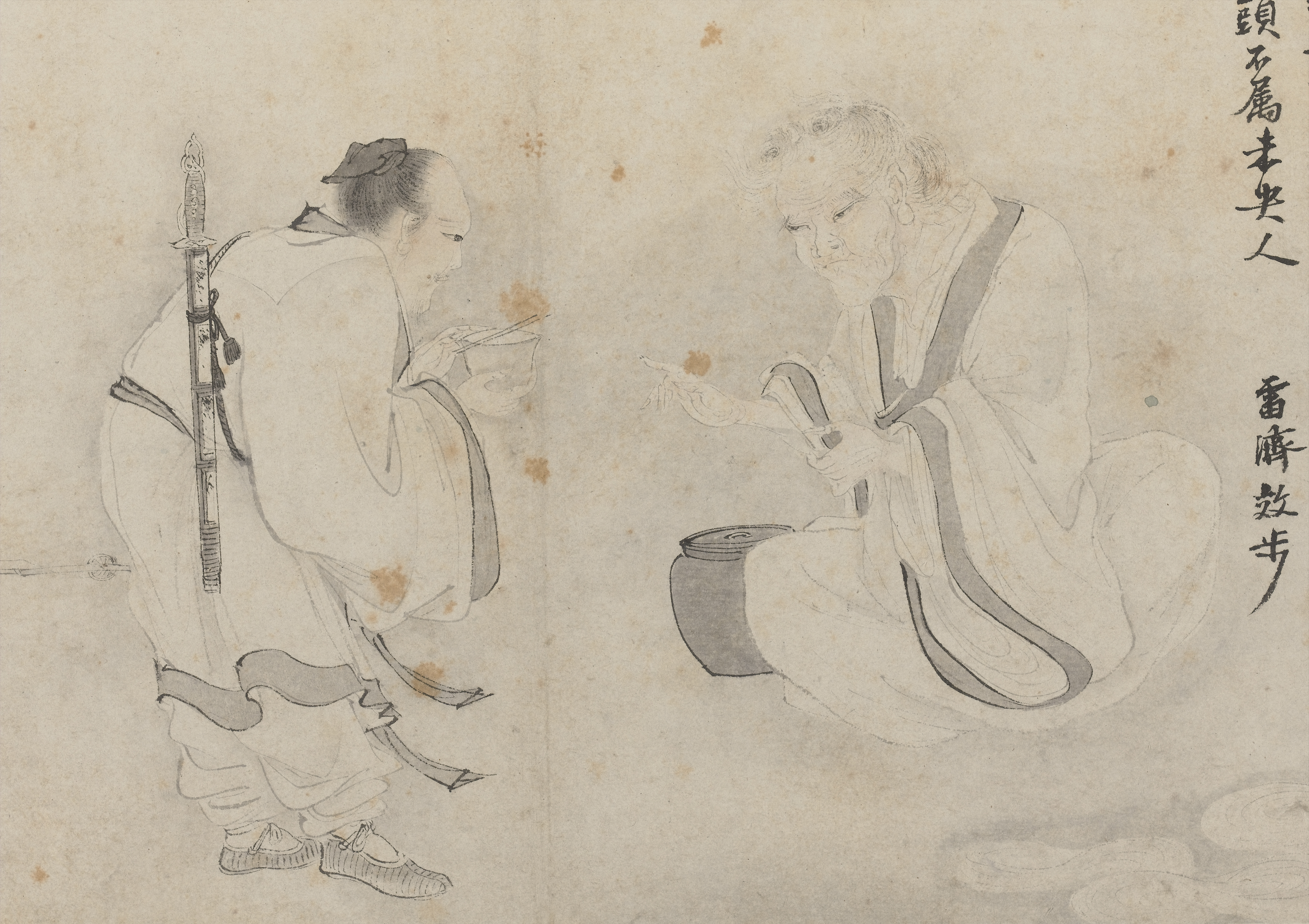
Han Xin receiving food from an elderly lady, depicted in a 1503 painting by Guo Xu

Some Chinese idioms and sayings originating from the events in Han Xin's life are listed as follows:

- Shame of crawling through between someone's legs (胯下之辱): Used to describe a humiliating incident. This idiom originated from the incident when Han Xin was bullied by a hooligan.
- When Han Xin selects his troops, the more the better (韓信點兵, 多多益善): Originated from a conversation between Han Xin and Liu Bang. Liu asked Han, "How many men do you think I can command?", to which Han Xin replied, "A maximum of 100,000." Liu Bang asked, "What about you?", and Han Xin replied, "The more the better." Liu Bang said, "So that means I cannot defeat you?" Han Xin explained, "No, my lord, you command generals while I command soldiers."
- Both success and failure are due to Xiao He (成也蕭何, 敗也蕭何): An idiom describing a common source for a person's success and demise. It alludes to the critical role that Xiao He played in recognising Han Xin's talent as a general, which enabled Han to put his talent to good use, but also Xiao He's collusion with Empress Lu resulting in Han Xin's death.
- Success and failure stem from Xiao He, life and death are due to two women (成敗一蕭何, 生死兩婦人): Refers to Xiao He's effect on Han Xin's life. The "two women" refers to the old woman who provided Han with food before he found success and Empress Lü Zhi who was responsible for his death.

While Han Xin was under house arrest, he did a mass organization of military books together with Zhang Liang. They put together one hundred and eighty-two books, removed certain parts and chose the reliable bits, and came out with thirty-five books. Han Xin himself also wrote three essays regarding military strategy.

His descendants are said to have fled to the area of modern Guangdong and Guangxi and changed their name to Wéi (韋).

=== Han Xin counting troops ===
According to common folklore, one of the archetypal forms of the Chinese remainder theorem was applied by Han Xin during the war with Chu with the common name "Han Xin counting soldiers" (韓信點兵 hán xìn diǎn bīng). The narration alleged that Han Xin organized his troops into groups of 3, 5 and 7 soldiers per group, and observed the remaining number of soldiers as 2, 3 and 2 respectively. After fitting the observations into the estimation of his original troop strength and casualties, he managed to calculate the number of his remaining troops as 1073 individuals, still more numerous than the contemporary Chu forces in the battle. The correct estimation of troop strength allowed Han Xin to win the battle.

== Evaluation ==
At the end of Han Xin's biography in Shiji, Sima Qian commented on Han as follows:

I've been to Huaiyin (present-day Huai'an, Jiangsu), and the locals told me that when Han Xin was still a commoner, his ambition was very different from ordinary people's. When his mother died, he was too poor to give her a proper funeral. However, he found a scenic area, on high and flat ground and capable of housing thousands, and buried her there. I've personally been to his mother's grave and it was exactly like what the locals described to me. If Han Xin was more modest and unassuming, did not boast about his achievements, and not been so egoistic, he would have attained fame, glory and wealth. In that case, his contributions to the Han dynasty would be comparable to those of the Duke of Zhou, Duke of Shao, and Jiang Ziya, and his descendants would be proud of him. However, Han Xin did not change himself for the better. Instead, when peace and stability had been restored in the empire (China), he plotted a rebellion and caused his clan to be implicated and exterminated. Is this not Heaven's will?

In volume 12 of Zizhi Tongjian, after the entry on Han Xin's death, Sima Guang commented on Han as follows:

Many people would think that Han Xin was the first person to propose the grand plan for unifying China: he started his plan together with (Emperor) Gaozu in Hanzhong, conquered the Three Qins, led a northern campaign to attack the kingdoms of Wei, Dai, Zhao, Yan and Qi, moved south to destroy Chu in Gaixia. As such, he is seen to have contributed greatly to the founding of the Han dynasty. When we look at how he rejected Kuai Che's suggestion to declare independence, and how he received Gaozu at Chen (present-day Huaiyang, Henan), how can we say he had the intention of rebelling? The reason for his rebellion was that he felt unhappy about losing his noble title. Lu Wan was merely Gaozu's neighbour, yet he was appointed King of Yan, while Han Xin only received the title of a marquis and could only have audiences with Gaozu. Is this not an example of how Gaozu treated Han Xin unfairly? I think that Gaozu did treat Han Xin unfairly when he lured Han into a trap and captured him, but Han was also at fault, which led to his downfall. When Gaozu was at war with Xiang Yu in Xingyang, Han Xin had just conquered the Qi kingdom and did not turn back to support Gaozu because he saw more danger of losing more soldiers if he went for saving lives of people at Pengcheng. The appointment as acting King of Qi was proposed later after many months of war defeats for Liu Bang. Besides, during the Battle of Guling, Han Xin did not keep his promise to help Gaozu, and caused Gaozu to lose the battle. Since then, Gaozu had the intention of killing Han Xin but did not do so as he was not yet powerful enough. When Gaozu's empire came into place, Han Xin no longer served any purpose.

Chinese royalty
Preceded by Tian Guang	King of Qi; 203 BCE – 202 BCE	Succeeded by Liu Fei
Preceded by Xiang Yu as Hegemon-King of Western Chu	King of Chu; 202 BCE – 201 BCE	Succeeded by Liu Jiao
Chinese nobility
New title	Marquis of Huaiyin; 201 BCE – 196 BCE	Unknown
